= 2026 Kings World Cup Nations =

Tournament details
- Host country: Brazil
- Dates: January 3–17
- Teams: 20
- Venues: 2 (in 1 host city)

Final positions
- Champions: Brazil (2nd title)
- Runners-up: Chile

Tournament statistics
- Matches played: 40
- Goals scored: 395 (9.88 per match)
- Top scorer(s): Lipão Pinheiro (14 goals)
- Best player: Kelvin Oliviera
- Best goalkeeper: Matías Herrera

The 2026 Kings World Cup Nations was an international seven-a-side football tournament based on the Kings League format created by Gerard Piqué and Ibai Llanos. It was the second edition of the Kings World Cup Nations, and took place from 3 to 17 January 2026 in Brazil, with São Paulo's Allianz Parque designated as the venue for the final.

== Format ==
The tournament has been expanded to 20 teams with five groups of four, with the top team from each group advancing directly to the quarterfinals, while the second-placed and best third-placed teams play a last-chance round.

== Teams ==
As usual in the Kings League, each national team was chaired by a streamer or a football related personality, but this time the chairpersons were given the title of 'captains', akin to tennis' Davis Cup. The 20 teams were announced during the Kings League Kickoff Day livestream on 11 October 2025. This edition saw the debuts of Algeria, Chile, France, India, Indonesia, the Netherlands, Poland, and Qatar; while Turkey, Ukraine, Korea Republic, and Uzbekistan did not return. Belgium was initially announced as a competing team, but on 29 November 2025, it was replaced by Algeria.

Nation	Captain(s)	Participation
Algeria	Hachemi Sabi (HachemiSB)	1st (debut)
Argentina	Sergio Agüero	2nd
Brazil	Ricardo Leite (Kaká), Cris Guedes, Neymar da Silva, Allan Rodrigues (O Estagiário), Alexandre Borba Chiqueta (Gaules), Bruno Goes (Nobru), Lucio dos Santos (Cerol), Luan Kovarik (Jon Vlogs), Aliffe de Carvalho (Paulinho o Loko), Lucas Gagliasso (Luquet4), Nyvi Estephan, Victor Costa (Coringa), Ludmilla, Konrad Dantas (Kondzilla) and Michel	2nd
Chile	Arturo Vidal and Cristóbal Álvarez (Shelao)	1st (debut)
Colombia	James Rodríguez and Juan Guarnizo	2nd
France	Adil Rami	1st (debut)
Germany	Kevin Teller (Papaplatte)	2nd
India	Ajey Nagar (CarryMinati)	1st (debut)
Indonesia	Atta Halilintar	1st (debut)
Italy	Gianmarco Tocco (Tumblurr)	2nd
Japan	Junichi Kato	2nd
Mexico	Miguel Layún and Samantha Rivera (Samy Rivers)	2nd
Morocco	Ilyas El Maliki	2nd
Netherlands	Mohammed Rashid (Chatmo) and Wesley Sneijder	1st (debut)
Peru	Paolo Guerrero and Andy Merino (Zeein)	2nd
Poland	Robert Lewandowski and Piotr Skowyrski (Izak)	1st (debut)
Qatar	Hassan Suleyman (AboFlah)	1st (debut)
Saudi Arabia	Mufreh Asiri (Drb7h)	2nd
Spain	Mario Alonso (DjMaRiiO)	2nd
United States	Nicholas Stewart (Jynxzi), Weston McKennie and Edwin Castro (Castro1021)	2nd

== Schedule ==
The tournament schedule was revealed on 4 December 2025. Kick-off times for matchday 3 were revealed on 8 January 2026

Stage	Round	Date
Group stage	Round 1	3-4 January 2026
Group stage	Round 2	5-9 January 2026
Group stage	Round 3	10-11 January 2026
Knockout stage
Knockout stage	Last-chance round	12 January 2026
Knockout stage	Quarterfinals	13-14 January 2026
Knockout stage	Semifinals	15 January 2026
Knockout stage	Final	17 January 2026

== Squads ==
Team squads

Algeria

The 13-man squad was announced on 29 December 2025.

Manager: Chadli Amri

No.	Pos.	Player	Date of birth (age)	Caps	Goals	Club
0	FW	Haris El Mouttaqi	19 August 2000 (aged 25)	0	0	(French Football Federation) Foot2Rue
5	DF	Zahana Haouari	3 October 2001 (aged 24)	0	0	Free agent
6	DF	Amine Bencherif	28 January 2000 (aged 25)	0	0	(French Football Federation) PANAM All Starz
7	MF	Riyad Messaoudi	5 January 2006 (aged 19)	0	0	Free agent
10	MF	Ismaïl Haddou	15 February 1996 (aged 29)	0	0	Free agent
12	DF	Carl Medjani	15 May 1985 (aged 40)	0	0	Free agent
18	MF	Sofiane Bendaoud	24 August 1992 (aged 33)	0	0	(French Football Federation) PANAM All Starz
19	MF	Moussa Haddad	15 May 1998 (aged 27)	0	0	Free agent
20	MF	Driss Zidane	5 March 1995 (aged 30)	0	0	(French Football Federation) Generation Seven
23	GK	El-Hedi Boussaid	25 December 1995 (aged 30)	0	0	Free agent
30	GK	Yonni Bouguerra	5 June 1996 (aged 29)	0	0	(French Football Federation) Generation Seven
63	FW	Boucif El Afghani	20 August 1997 (aged 28)	0	0	(French Football Federation) Generation Seven
99	MF	Sofiane Ahmed-Kadi	18 April 1997 (aged 28)	0	0	Free agent

Argentina

Manager: Juan Manuel Miranda

No.	Pos.	Player	Date of birth (age)	Caps	Goals	Club
1	GK	Leo Silva	15 July 1996 (aged 29)	0	0	Free agent
2	DF	Ezequiel Cohen	10 March 1993 (aged 32)	3	0	Free agent
3	DF	Fabrizio Foresto	5 December 2001 (aged 24)	0	0	Free agent
5	DF	Dago Campari	5 October 2000 (aged 25)	0	0	Free agent
6	MF	Santiago Rotemberg	22 March 2005 (aged 20)	0	0	Free agent
7	FW	Tomás Sandoval	30 July 2002 (aged 23)	0	0	Free agent
8	DF	Facu Navajas	28 February 1998 (aged 27)	3	1	Free agent
9	FW	Aaron Martínez	3 March 2001 (aged 24)	0	0	Free agent
11	MF	Franco Romero	9 July 1997 (aged 28)	3	0	Free agent
17	FW	Facu Romero	23 June 2004 (aged 21)	3	1	Free agent
21	DF	Leonel Vangioni	5 May 1987 (aged 38)	0	0	Free agent
23	GK	Luís Sánchez	4 July 1997 (aged 28)	3	1	Free agent
27	MF	Gonzalo Lescano	2 March 2001 (aged 24)	0	0	Free agent

Brazil

The 13-man squad was announced on 5 December 2025.

Manager: Dudu Oliveira

No.	Pos.	Player	Date of birth (age)	Caps	Goals	Club
3	DF	Wembley Luiz	15 August 1997 (aged 28)	5	0	(Brazilian Football Confederation) G3X FC
6	DF	Canhoto	25 April 2001 (aged 24)	0	0	(Brazilian Football Confederation) Dendele FC
7	FW	Everton Felipe	23 November 1990 (aged 35)	0	0	(Brazilian Football Confederation) G3X FC
8	MF	Well	21 July 1997 (aged 28)	5	1	(Brazilian Football Confederation) FC Real Elite
9	FW	Kelvin Oliveira	15 August 1995 (aged 30)	5	19	(Brazilian Football Confederation) G3X FC
10	MF	Andreas Vaz	18 May 1995 (aged 30)	5	2	(Brazilian Football Confederation) G3X FC
11	FW	Leleti	27 April 1996 (aged 29)	5	2	(Brazilian Football Confederation) Furia FC
12	MF	Jeffinho	26 September 1995 (aged 30)	5	1	(Brazilian Football Confederation) Furia FC
14	FW	Lipão	11 December 1996 (aged 29)	5	0	(Brazilian Football Confederation) Furia FC
19	MF	Luan Mestre	28 May 1993 (aged 32)	0	0	(Brazilian Football Confederation) Funkbol Clube
20	DF	Matheus Dedo	16 November 2001 (aged 24)	0	0	(Brazilian Football Confederation) Furia FC
27	GK	Esaú Nascimento	11 January 1999 (aged 26)	0	0	(Brazilian Football Confederation) LOUD SC
33	GK	Victor Hugo	16 January 1991 (aged 34)	0	0	(Brazilian Football Confederation) Furia FC

Chile

The 13-man squad was announced on 23 December 2025.

Manager: Felipe Barrientos

No.	Pos.	Player	Date of birth (age)	Caps	Goals	Club
1	GK	Rodrigo Martínez	15 May 2000 (aged 25)	0	0	Free agent
3	DF	Christian Vilches	13 July 1983 (aged 42)	0	0	Free agent
9	FW	Matías Donoso	8 July 1986 (aged 39)	0	0	Free agent
10	MF	Mathías Vidangossy	25 May 1987 (aged 38)	0	0	(Colombian Football Federation) Aniquiladores FC
17	MF	Piero Gárate	24 May 1992 (aged 33)	0	0	Free agent
19	DF	Ezequiel Luna	19 November 1986 (aged 39)	0	0	Free agent
21	MF	Juan Araya	5 May 1998 (aged 27)	0	0	Free agent
23	MF	Ángel Iturra	23 January 2000 (aged 25)	0	0	Free agent
24	DF	Fernando Saavedra	20 June 1997 (aged 28)	0	0	Free agent
28	FW	Ignacio Herrera	14 October 1987 (aged 38)	0	0	Free agent
30	FW	Carlos González	2 June 1997 (aged 28)	0	0	Free agent
80	DF	Matías Rojas	4 January 1996 (aged 29)	0	0	Free agent
99	GK	Matías Herrera	7 May 1995 (aged 30)	0	0	Free agent

Colombia

The 13-man squad was announced on 12 December 2025.

Manager: (Argentina) Sergio Verdirame

No.	Pos.	Player	Date of birth (age)	Caps	Goals	Club
1	GK	Felipe Urán	8 March 2000 (aged 25)	0	0	(Colombian Football Federation) Atlético Parceros
2	DF	Denilson Lobón	15 March 1999 (aged 26)	5	1	(Saudi Arabian Football Federation) SXB
5	DF	Alberto Benítez	28 July 1999 (aged 26)	0	0	(Colombian Football Federation) Atlético Parceros
7	FW	Julio Perea	21 July 1996 (aged 29)	5	2	(Colombian Football Federation) Atlético Parceros
8	MF	Brihan Gutiérrez	2 December 1997 (aged 28)	5	2	(Colombian Football Federation) Aniquiladores FC
10	MF	Angellot Caro	3 December 1988 (aged 37)	5	2	(Colombian Football Federation) Atlético Parceros
11	FW	Alejandro Ortega	28 March 2000 (aged 25)	5	4	Free agent
12	GK	Camilo Mena	12 January 1999 (aged 26)	5	1	(Saudi Arabian Football Federation) SXB
17	MF	David Loaiza	3 October 1993 (aged 32)	0	0	(Colombian Football Federation) Atlético Parceros
18	FW	Cristian González	3 December 1998 (aged 27)	0	0	(Mexican Football Federation) Simios FC
19	MF	Brayam Nazarit	15 May 1992 (aged 33)	0	0	(United States Soccer Federation) Los Aliens FC
22	DF	Yair Arias	20 January 2000 (aged 25)	5	0	(Peruvian Football Federation) Persas FC
24	MF	Jhon Palacios	3 July 2001 (aged 24)	5	1	(Peruvian Football Federation) Persas FC

France

Manager: (Monaco) Grégory Campi

No.	Pos.	Player	Date of birth (age)	Caps	Goals	Club
8	MF	Théo Chendri	26 May 1997 (aged 28)	0	0	(French Football Federation) Unit3d
10	MF	Moussa Sao	17 October 1989 (aged 36)	0	0	(French Football Federation) PANAM All Starz
15	GK	Florian Verplanck	17 February 1992 (aged 33)	0	0	Free agent
17	DF	Anthony Scaramozzino	30 April 1985 (aged 40)	0	0	(French Football Federation) Unit3d
19	GK	Guillaume Lesec	4 July 1995 (aged 30)	0	0	(French Football Federation) PANAM All Starz
20	GK	Emmanuel Mifsud	12 February 1998 (aged 27)	0	0	(French Football Federation) Unit3d
22	FW	Jonathan Kodija	22 October 1989 (aged 36)	0	0	(French Football Federation) Unit3d
23	MF	Clément Goguey	25 November 1997 (aged 28)	0	0	(French Football Federation) Generation Seven
25	MF	Giannelli Imbula	12 September 1992 (aged 33)	0	0	(French Football Federation) Foot2Rue
27	MF	Nicolas Martins	27 June 1999 (aged 26)	0	0	(French Football Federation) PANAM All Starz
29	DF	Walid Soudi	12 September 1997 (aged 28)	0	0	Free agent
78	DF	Alseny Sano	21 June 2003 (aged 22)	0	0	(French Football Federation) Unit3d
95	MF	Idir Ahmin	6 March 1997 (aged 28)	0	0	(French Football Federation) PANAM All Starz
99	FW	Nassim Lallemand	2 February 1999 (aged 26)	0	0	Free agent

Germany

The 13-man squad was announced on 7 December 2025.

Manager: Francisco Copado

No.	Pos.	Player	Date of birth (age)	Caps	Goals	Club
1	GK	Daniel Dreesen	4 September 1987 (aged 38)	0	0	(German Football Association) Futbolistas Locos FC
3	DF	Hagen Blohm	5 October 2002 (aged 23)	0	0	(German Football Association) Vice Versa FC
5	DF	Herbert Paul	10 February 1994 (aged 31)	3	0	(German Football Association) ERA Colonia
6	DF	Daniel Jelisic	18 February 2000 (aged 25)	0	0	(German Football Association) No Rules FC
7	MF	Nick Salihamidžić	8 February 2003 (aged 22)	3	2	(German Football Association) No Rules FC
9	FW	Serhat Imsak	20 July 1999 (aged 26)	0	0	(German Football Association) No Rules FC
10	MF	Amar Cekić	21 December 1992 (aged 33)	0	0	(German Football Association) No Rules FC
11	FW	Yazid Tambo	24 February 2003 (aged 22)	0	0	(German Football Association) Kaktus Kickers
17	MF	Danny Blum	7 January 1991 (aged 34)	0	0	(German Football Association) Youniors FC
21	DF	Salvatore Giambra	7 May 2004 (aged 21)	0	0	(German Football Association) Futbolistas Locos FC
22	DF	Emir Sejdovic	25 April 2000 (aged 25)	0	0	(German Football Association) Youniors FC
29	GK	Aboubakar Fofana	7 March 1997 (aged 28)	0	0	(German Football Association) Tiki Tacker Fußball Freunde
77	MF	Mehmet-Can Senocak	2 November 2002 (aged 23)	0	0	(German Football Association) G2 FC

India

Manager: Sanush Raj

No.	Pos.	Player	Date of birth (age)	Caps	Goals	Club
7	FW	Nijo Gilbert	16 October 1999 (aged 26)	0	0	Free agent
10	MF	Ananda Reddy	20 June 1996 (aged 29)	0	0	Free agent
11	DF	Alexander Romario	26 July 1996 (aged 29)	0	0	Free agent
12	MF	Mushraf Muhammed	22 October 2003 (aged 22)	0	0	Free agent
13	DF	Jishnu Kadavath	4 November 1999 (aged 26)	0	0	Free agent
15	DF	Rijohn Jose	6 September 1997 (aged 28)	0	0	Free agent
16	MF	Biswa Darjee	8 November 1999 (aged 26)	0	0	Free agent
20	MF	Ajin Anthony	5 March 2005 (aged 20)	0	0	Free agent
21	GK	Jaimy Joy	30 August 1998 (aged 27)	0	0	Free agent
28	FW	Prasanth Karuthadathkuni	24 June 1997 (aged 28)	0	0	Free agent
36	MF	Asif Khan	9 March 2001 (aged 24)	0	0	Free agent
47	FW	Muhammed Roshal	8 March 2003 (aged 22)	0	0	Free agent
77	FW	Soham Bhagawati	4 December 2003 (aged 22)	0	0	Free agent

Indonesia

Indonesia's squad was chosen from the Pendekar League.

Manager: Fandy Butarbutar

No.	Pos.	Player	Date of birth (age)	Caps	Goals	Club
1	GK	Muhamad Nazil	23 March 1992 (aged 33)	0	0	Free agent
4	DF	Ahmad Yani	19 December 1990 (aged 35)	0	0	Free agent
7	MF	Mohammad Fauzan	23 February 2002 (aged 23)	0	0	Free agent
8	MF	Abdul Aziz	14 February 1994 (aged 31)	0	0	Free agent
9	FW	Ahmad Dilbar	14 October 1991 (aged 34)	0	0	Free agent
11	MF	Piter Junior	24 November 1998 (aged 27)	0	0	Free agent
15	GK	Leonardo Pasautaya	15 August 1993 (aged 32)	0	0	Free agent
17	FW	Muhammad Fatur	27 May 2003 (aged 22)	0	0	Free agent
18	MF	Reza Yamani	15 March 1993 (aged 32)	0	0	Free agent
19	DF	Jordy Rinalvi	19 February 2000 (aged 25)	0	0	Free agent
76	MF	Fhandy Permana	7 June 1993 (aged 32)	0	0	Free agent
77	MF	Gurpreet Dhillon	18 September 2000 (aged 25)	0	0	Free agent
99	DF	Anan Lestaluhu	22 September 1999 (aged 26)	0	0	Free agent

Italy

Manager: Mauro Micheli

No.	Pos.	Player	Date of birth (age)	Caps	Goals	Club
0	FW	Paolo Scienza	17 October 1997 (aged 28)	0	0	(Italian Football Federation) TRM FC
3	DF	Vlad Marin	15 May 1995 (aged 30)	2	0	(Italian Football Federation) Alpak FC
6	DF	Marco Evangelisti	2 December 2000 (aged 25)	0	0	(Italian Football Federation) Stallions
8	MF	Domenico Rossi	5 September 2000 (aged 25)	2	3	(Italian Football Federation) Underdogs FC
10	FW	Matteo Perrotti	17 April 1999 (aged 26)	0	0	(Italian Football Federation) Underdogs FC
11	FW	Alessandro Colombo	4 July 2001 (aged 24)	0	0	(Italian Football Federation) Circus FC
22	GK	Gianmarco Chironi	7 September 1997 (aged 28)	0	0	(Italian Football Federation) Gear7 FC
23	MF	Alessandro Gelsi	7 October 1997 (aged 28)	2	0	(Italian Football Federation) Alpak FC
25	DF	Alessandro Di Dio	20 October 1993 (aged 32)	0	0	(Italian Football Federation) TRM FC
27	FW	Giammarco Massa	4 July 1999 (aged 26)	0	0	(Italian Football Federation) Alpak FC
30	MF	Niccolò Marino	24 October 1999 (aged 26)	0	0	(Italian Football Federation) Stallions
77	FW	Simone Lo Faso	18 February 1998 (aged 27)	0	0	(Italian Football Federation) Boomers
97	GK	Vittorio Gilli	11 April 1997 (aged 28)	0	0	(Italian Football Federation) FC Caesar

Japan

Manager: Shunsuke Nakamura

No.	Pos.	Player	Date of birth (age)	Caps	Goals	Club
1	GK	Rikiya Narita	2 October 1987 (aged 38)	0	0	Free agent
6	DF	Shohei Agata	25 May 1994 (aged 31)	3	1	Free agent
7	DF	Kouga Yokoyama	26 May 1996 (aged 29)	0	0	Free agent
8	MF	Yuya Hakozaki	16 September 1994 (aged 31)	0	0	Free agent
9	MF	Kazuki Hamamoto	30 May 1998 (aged 27)	0	0	Free agent
10	MF	Toshiya Miyashita	22 February 2003 (aged 22)	0	0	Free agent
13	FW	Ryuhei Tanabe	30 October 1999 (aged 26)	0	0	Free agent
14	FW	Reo Umetsu	7 November 1999 (aged 26)	0	0	Free agent
29	GK	Yusei Narita	29 December 1999 (aged 26)	3	0	Free agent
46	FW	Kensei Matsumori	21 June 2003 (aged 22)	0	0	Free agent
74	MF	Keisuke Shigenobu	1 September 2000 (aged 25)	0	0	Free agent
77	FW	Pablo Miura	10 November 1999 (aged 26)	0	0	Free agent
83	DF	Masaya Nozaki	3 August 1993 (aged 32)	0	0	Free agent

Mexico

A preliminary 26-man squad was announced on 2 December 2025, with the final 13-man squad being announced on 10 December.

Manager: (Spain) Pol Font

No.	Pos.	Player	Date of birth (age)	Caps	Goals	Club
1	GK	Antonio Monterde	16 December 1997 (aged 28)	5	1	(Peruvian Football Federation) Persas FC
5	DF	Martín Rodríguez	18 May 1998 (aged 27)	5	0	(Colombian Football Federation) Aniquiladores FC
6	DF	Carlos Valdez	30 August 1989 (aged 36)	0	0	(Mexican Football Federation) Peluche Caligari
7	FW	José Askenazi	30 June 2002 (aged 23)	0	0	(Mexican Football Federation) Club de Cuervos
10	MF	Obed Martínez	30 March 1996 (aged 29)	5	8	(Peruvian Football Federation) Persas FC
11	MF	Martín Lara	25 July 1998 (aged 27)	0	0	(Mexican Football Federation) Peluche Caligari
13	DF	Eddie Sánchez	15 July 1997 (aged 28)	0	0	(Mexican Football Federation) Peluche Caligari
19	DF	Tonatiuh Mejía	31 August 1999 (aged 26)	0	0	(Venezuelan Football Federation) Los Chamos FC
22	FW	Daviz Junco	17 August 2000 (aged 25)	5	0	(Colombian Football Federation) Aniquiladores FC
26	GK	Moisés Dabbah	24 July 1997 (aged 28)	0	0	(Mexican Football Federation) Peluche Caligari
34	FW	Genaro Castillo	25 May 1993 (aged 32)	0	0	(Venezuelan Football Federation) Los Chamos FC
77	FW	Diego Martínez	22 September 1988 (aged 37)	5	1	(Colombian Football Federation) Aniquiladores FC
90	DF	Alexis Silva	12 December 1992 (aged 33)	0	0	(Mexican Football Federation) Raniza FC

Morocco

Manager: Gaby Ouanane

No.	Pos.	Player	Date of birth (age)	Caps	Goals	Club
1	GK	Sofiane Bouzian	13 July 2000 (aged 25)	0	0	Free agent
3	DF	Nadir Louah	29 May 2003 (aged 22)	5	9	(Royal Spanish Football Federation) Porcinos FC
7	FW	Isma Reguia	2 July 2001 (aged 24)	0	0	(Royal Spanish Football Federation) 1K FC
8	DF	Sohaib Rektout	16 May 2003 (aged 22)	0	0	(Royal Spanish Football Federation) La Capital CF
11	FW	Mohamed Lamlih	24 May 1994 (aged 31)	0	0	Free agent
17	DF	Yacine Dahmani	3 February 1997 (aged 28)	0	0	Free agent
18	DF	Abdenacer Afi	7 November 1998 (aged 27)	0	0	(Royal Moroccan Football Federation) Ultra Chmicha
23	DF	Younes Boudadi	23 January 1996 (aged 29)	0	0	Free agent
31	GK	Moustafa Idrissi	25 July 1996 (aged 29)	0	0	Free agent
48	DF	Youssef Khatiri	3 February 1998 (aged 27)	0	0	(French Football Federation) Unit3d
80	MF	Fuad El Amrani	8 August 1993 (aged 32)	5	4	(Saudi Arabian Football Federation) SXB
98	FW	Walid Jaadi	6 January 1998 (aged 27)	0	0	(Royal Moroccan Football Federation) Ultra Chmicha

Netherlands

Manager: Mohamed Attaibi

No.	Pos.	Player	Date of birth (age)	Caps	Goals	Club
1	GK	Joe van der Sar	16 March 1998 (aged 27)	0	0	Free agent
4	DF	Ismail Bouhalhoul	11 September 2001 (aged 24)	0	0	Free agent
6	DF	Oualid Tarifit	23 August 1998 (aged 27)	0	0	Free agent
7	FW	Abdelghani El Bachir	24 June 2000 (aged 25)	0	0	Free agent
8	MF	Yuya Ikeshita	8 May 2002 (aged 23)	0	0	Free agent
10	FW	Jama Telli	26 March 1996 (aged 29)	0	0	Free agent
11	FW	Randy Wolters	6 April 1990 (aged 35)	0	0	Free agent
12	FW	Said Bouzambou	9 February 1990 (aged 35)	0	0	Free agent
20	GK	Huub Schuurman	5 February 2002 (aged 23)	0	0	Free agent
21	DF	Jordy Cretier	16 July 1994 (aged 31)	0	0	Free agent
22	MF	Mohamed Chih	12 August 1999 (aged 26)	0	0	Free agent
23	MF	Yassine Bensalah	2 September 2003 (aged 22)	0	0	Free agent
80	FW	Ilias Boudouni	14 March 1999 (aged 26)	0	0	Free agent

Peru

Manager: (Colombia) Cheche Hernández

No.	Pos.	Player	Date of birth (age)	Caps	Goals	Club
1	GK	Percy Valverde	28 October 1996 (aged 29)	0	0	Free agent
7	MF	Bruno Agnello	7 December 1985 (aged 40)	0	0	Free agent
8	DF	Luis Saravia	25 November 1995 (aged 30)	0	0	Free agent
9	FW	Giovani Asencio	15 June 1982 (aged 43)	0	0	Free agent
10	MF	Ivan Gálvez	18 August 1995 (aged 30)	3	4	Free agent
11	FW	Luis Fidel Vivas	23 May 1998 (aged 27)	0	0	Free agent
15	FW	Jorge Sevilla	24 July 1993 (aged 32)	0	0	Free agent
16	DF	Yovanny Portilla	4 July 1992 (aged 33)	3	1	Free agent
17	GK	Erick Ramírez	17 February 1992 (aged 33)	0	0	Free agent
18	MF	Rimber Sánchez	14 November 1990 (aged 35)	0	0	Free agent
19	MF	Jesús Honores	30 March 1988 (aged 37)	3	1	Free agent
22	MF	Juan Carlos Pérez	27 September 2001 (aged 24)	0	0	Free agent
30	MF	Kevin Gutiérrez	1 October 1993 (aged 32)	0	0	Free agent

Poland

Manager: Klaudiusz Hirsch

No.	Pos.	Player	Date of birth (age)	Caps	Goals	Club
6	MF	Roger Guerreiro	25 May 1982 (aged 43)	0	0	Free agent
7	FW	Bartłomiej Dębicki	24 June 1983 (aged 42)	0	0	Free agent
8	MF	Karol Bienias	25 October 2002 (aged 23)	0	0	Free agent
10	MF	Norbert Jaszczak	10 January 2000 (aged 25)	0	0	Free agent
11	FW	Dominik Środa	11 September 2004 (aged 21)	0	0	Free agent
17	DF	Julien Tadrowski	17 May 1993 (aged 32)	0	0	Free agent
20	FW	Dawid Linca	10 July 1999 (aged 26)	0	0	Free agent
21	MF	Jakub Hat	14 June 2001 (aged 24)	0	0	Free agent
25	GK	Dawid Zioberro	19 December 2000 (aged 25)	0	0	Free agent
27	DF	Kamil Kucharski	20 February 1996 (aged 29)	0	0	Free agent
33	FW	Michał Matczak	14 July 2000 (aged 25)	0	0	Free agent
94	GK	Patryk Zapała	3 March 2003 (aged 22)	0	0	Free agent
95	FW	Oliver Zaręba	7 July 2003 (aged 22)	0	0	Free agent

Qatar

Manager: (Spain) Àlex Solduga

No.	Pos.	Player	Date of birth (age)	Caps	Goals	Club
1	GK	Mame Cheikh Diop	1 January 1996 (aged 30)	0	0	Free agent
5	DF	Abelilah Elferdaousy	23 March 1992 (aged 33)	0	0	Free agent
7	FW	Keshaun McCalla	22 July 1997 (aged 28)	0	0	Free agent
10	MF	Daniel Moreno	26 October 2004 (aged 21)	0	0	Free agent
11	MF	Mohamed Amine El Attac	7 August 2006 (aged 19)	0	0	Free agent
17	MF	Chouaib Wazad	1 February 1993 (aged 32)	0	0	Free agent
20	DF	Zakaria Zeroual	9 February 1999 (aged 26)	0	0	Free agent
21	DF	Jay Toet	19 January 2002 (aged 23)	0	0	Free agent
33	GK	Houssine Benchrif	6 November 1992 (aged 33)	0	0	Free agent
40	MF	Haythem Ben	27 August 2005 (aged 20)	0	0	(Qatar Football Association) ABO FC
44	MF	Aaron Clarke	22 July 2000 (aged 25)	0	0	Free agent
98	DF	Jorge Monegal	28 October 2001 (aged 24)	0	0	Free agent
99	FW	Youssef Chakiri	1 September 2001 (aged 24)	0	0	Free agent

Saudi Arabia

Manager: (Brazil) Felipe Góes

No.	Pos.	Player	Date of birth (age)	Caps	Goals	Club
1	GK	Moayad Alkarnib	30 September 2003 (aged 22)	0	0	(Saudi Arabian Football Federation) SXB
4	DF	Nawaf Aroan	13 June 1994 (aged 31)	0	0	Free agent
5	DF	Hussam Tah	6 November 1994 (aged 31)	0	0	(Kuwait Football Association) FWZ
7	MF	Wail Bin Jubeir	12 August 2002 (aged 23)	0	0	Free agent
8	DF	Osama Baabdullah	18 August 1995 (aged 30)	0	0	Free agent
9	FW	Sultan Azaz	16 March 1994 (aged 31)	0	0	Free agent
10	MF	Moath Alasiri	4 June 1992 (aged 33)	0	0	(Qatar Football Association) ABO FC
11	FW	Muath Alharbi	10 July 1998 (aged 27)	0	0	Free agent
18	DF	Ali Aldhawyan	21 October 2000 (aged 25)	0	0	(Kuwait Football Association) FWZ
19	FW	Abdullah Alaqeeli	16 April 2001 (aged 24)	0	0	Free agent
22	GK	Albaraa Aldosari	5 October 1996 (aged 29)	0	0	(Qatar Football Association) ABO FC
70	MF	Abullah Almaghrabi	11 December 1997 (aged 28)	0	0	Free agent
77	FW	Nawaf Saleh	12 November 2006 (aged 19)	0	0	(Kuwait Football Association) FWZ

Spain

A preliminary 26-man squad was announced on 4 December 2025, with the final 13-man squad being announced on 15 December.

Manager: Narcís Barrera

No.	Pos.	Player	Date of birth (age)	Caps	Goals	Club
1	GK	Eloy Amoedo	10 March 2003 (aged 22)	0	0	(Royal Spanish Football Federation) Los Troncos FC
4	DF	David Soriano	5 January 2000 (aged 25)	0	0	(Royal Spanish Football Federation) Porcinos FC
7	FW	Nico Santos	7 February 2000 (aged 25)	3	1	(Royal Spanish Football Federation) Porcinos FC
8	MF	Marc Pelaz	19 September 2003 (aged 22)	3	0	(Royal Spanish Football Federation) Porcinos FC
10	MF	Óscar Coll	19 June 2000 (aged 25)	0	0	(Royal Spanish Football Federation) Porcinos FC
11	MF	Dani Liñares	16 May 1998 (aged 27)	0	0	(Royal Spanish Football Federation) Ultimate Móstoles
16	DF	Àlex Gutiérrez	11 March 1994 (aged 31)	3	3	(Royal Spanish Football Federation) Porcinos FC
17	DF	Aitor Vives	6 August 1998 (aged 27)	3	0	(Royal Spanish Football Federation) Porcinos FC
19	MF	Cristian Lobato	7 March 1989 (aged 36)	0	0	(Royal Spanish Football Federation) Jijantes FC
21	DF	Carles Planas	4 March 1991 (aged 34)	0	0	(Royal Spanish Football Federation) Los Troncos FC
25	GK	Dani Pérez	7 October 1998 (aged 27)	3	0	(Royal Spanish Football Federation) Porcinos FC
30	FW	Gerard Nolla	2 September 1998 (aged 27)	0	0	(Royal Spanish Football Federation) Los Troncos FC
92	FW	Aleix Martí	19 October 2004 (aged 21)	0	0	(Royal Spanish Football Federation) Ultimate Móstoles

United States

The first three players for the United States' squad were selected through a social media competition, and announced by co-captain Jynxzi on a livestream on 4 December 2025.

Manager: (Mexico) Jos Gartland

No.	Pos.	Player	Date of birth (age)	Caps	Goals	Club
1	GK	Eduardo Cortés	28 January 1993 (aged 32)	3	3	(United States Soccer Federation) Los Aliens FC
5	DF	Brady O'Neill	8 June 2000 (aged 25)	0	0	Free agent
7	MF	Gustavo Gomes	13 June 2002 (aged 23)	0	0	Free agent
10	MF	Gabriel Costa	16 December 1996 (aged 29)	0	0	(Dominican Football Federation) Galácticos del Caribe
11	MF	Roc Bancells	7 April 2003 (aged 22)	0	0	(Royal Spanish Football Federation) Rayo de Barcelona
13	DF	Danny Núñez	16 August 1997 (aged 28)	3	2	Free agent
15	FW	Luiz Morales	23 October 1995 (aged 30)	0	0	(United States Soccer Federation) Miami 7
17	MF	Sebastian Mendez	6 March 2001 (aged 24)	0	0	Free agent
18	DF	Erik Macías	21 September 1996 (aged 29)	3	0	Free agent
22	FW	Raheem Taylor-Parkes	21 April 1998 (aged 27)	0	0	Free agent
23	GK	Anthony Martinez	23 December 2003 (aged 22)	0	0	Free agent
24	DF	Stefan Mijatovic	5 May 1996 (aged 29)	0	0	Free agent
25	MF	Juan Ramírez	30 January 1998 (aged 27)	0	0	(United States Soccer Federation) Miami 7
31	MF	David Ortiz	20 September 2000 (aged 25)	3	1	(United States Soccer Federation) Miami 7

== Draw ==
The groups were drawn during the Kings League Kickoff Day livestream on 11 October 2025. Teams were seeded to 2 pots, with two teams from each pot being drawn into each group.

=== Seeding ===
Pot 1	Pot 2
Argentina; Brazil; Colombia; France; Germany; Italy; Mexico; Morocco; Saudi Arabia; Spain	Belgium; Chile; India; Indonesia; Japan; Netherlands; Peru; Poland; Qatar; United States

=== Groups ===
Group A	Group B	Group C	Group D	Group E
Morocco	Germany	Italy	Brazil	Mexico
Colombia	Argentina	France	Spain	Saudi Arabia
Chile	United States	Poland	Qatar	India
Netherlands	Japan	Algeria	Peru	Indonesia

Notes

Belgium withdrew on 29 November, and was replaced by Algeria.

== Group stage ==
=== Tiebreaker ===
Teams were ranked by the number of wins. If two or three teams are equal on wins, it will be decided by penalty shootout after their match(es) (triple shootout if it's 3 teams)

=== Group A ===
Pos	Team	Pld	W	L	GF	GA	GD	Qualification
1	Chile	3	3	0	14	9	+5	Quarterfinals
2	Netherlands	3	1 (Note: Colombia, Morocco, and the Netherlands were all tied on wins. A tiebreaking triple shootout took place on 11 January 2025, 21:00 local time. Final results were: Morocco on last place with only 2 goals, Colombia on 2nd with 6 goals, and the Netherlands on 1st with 7 goals.)	2	11	15	−4	Last-chance round
3	Colombia	3	1	2	15	12	+3	
4	Morocco	3	1	2	11	15	−4	

Source: Kings League
Notes:
3 January 2026
16:00 (BRT)

Chile	3–3	Netherlands
M. Herrera 2'; Luna 13'; N. Herrera 31' (pen.)	Report	Ikeshita 8'; Chatmo 24' (pp); Chih 35'
Penalties
Vidangossy (penalty missed); Donoso (penalty scored); N. Herrera (penalty scored); Araya (penalty scored)	3–1	(penalty scored) Telli; (penalty missed) Wolters; (penalty missed) Bouzambou; (penalty missed) Bouhalhoul

Kings League Arena Brazil, São Paulo
4 January 2026
18:00 (BRT)

Morocco	5–3	Colombia
Jaadi 3', 22', 23', 37'; Louah 5'	Report	Brihan Guti 22'; Loaiza 32' (x2)

Kings League Arena Brazil, São Paulo
5 January 2026
19:00 (BRT)

Colombia	7–2	Netherlands
Loaiza 5'; González 13'; Palacios 16', 24'; Mr. Stiven 23' (pp); Lobón 23' (pen.); Caro 43'	Report	Van der Sar 1'; Chih 41'

Kings League Arena Brazil, São Paulo
7 January 2026
18:00 (BRT)

Chile	6–1	Morocco
Araya 5'; N. Herrera 22', 23', 31', 41'; Vidangossy 31' (sg)	Report	Louah 40'

Kings League Arena Brazil, São Paulo
11 January 2026
16:00 (BRT)

Morocco	5–6 (g.g.)	Netherlands
Louah 3'; Reguia 23'; Jaadi 20' (x2), 24' (sg)	Report	Ikeshita 2', 40'; Telli 21'; Bouhalhoul 26' (pen.); Wolters 26'; Boudouni 37'

Kings League Arena Brazil, São Paulo
11 January 2026
17:00 (BRT)

Colombia	5–5	Chile
Palacios 3', 23'; Guti 6'; Loaiza 21'; Caro 23'	Report	M. Herrera 1', 2', 2'; Araya 23', 36'
Penalties
Loaiza (penalty scored); Guti (penalty missed); Ortega (penalty missed); Caro (penalty missed); Benitez (penalty missed)	1–2	(penalty scored) N. Herrera; (penalty scored) Donoso; (penalty missed) Araya; (penalty missed) Vidangossy

Kings League Arena Brazil, São Paulo

Tiebreaking shootout

Order	Team	Score
1	Colombia	Caro (penalty missed); Loaiza (penalty scored); Palacios (penalty missed); González (penalty scored); Guti (penalty scored); Uran (penalty missed); Caro (penalty missed); Loaiza (penalty scored); Loaiza (penalty scored) ---- Loaiza (penalty missed); Loaiza (penalty scored); Loaiza (penalty missed); Loaiza (penalty missed); Guti (penalty missed)
2	Morocco	Jaadi (penalty missed); Rektout (penalty missed); Al Amrani (penalty missed); Reguia (penalty missed); Louah (penalty missed); Idrissi (penalty scored); Khatiri (penalty missed); Dahmani (penalty missed); Boudadi (penalty scored)
3	Netherlands	Telli (penalty missed); Boudouni (penalty scored); Ikeshita (penalty missed); Bouhalhoul (penalty scored); Wolters (penalty missed); Schuurman (penalty missed); Boudouni (penalty scored); Bouhalhoul (penalty scored); Boudouni (penalty scored) ---- Boudouni (penalty missed); Bouhalhoul (penalty scored); Bouhalhoul (penalty missed); Boudouni (penalty missed); Bouhalhoul (penalty scored)

The Netherlands wins and finishes in 2nd place

=== Group B ===
Pos	Team	Pld	W	L	GF	GA	GD	Qualification
1	Germany	3	2 (Note: Germany, the United States, and Argentina were all tied on wins. A tiebreaking triple shootout took place on 10 January 2025, 19:00 local time. The final results were: Argentina on 3rd with 4 goals, the United States on 2nd with 5 goals, and Germany on 1st with 6 goals.)	1	18	13	+5	Quarterfinals
2	United States	3	2	1	19	17	+2	Last-chance round
3	Argentina	3	2	1	11	12	−1	Last-chance round
4	Japan	3	0	3	7	13	−6	

Source: Kings League
Notes:
3 January 2026
17:00 (BRT)

United States	5–2	Japan
Bancells 5', 22', 29'; Castro 17' (pp); Costa 41'	Report	Shingenobu 29'; Kato 29' (pp)

Kings League Arena Brazil, São Paulo
4 January 2026
16:00 (BRT)

Germany	3–3	Argentina
Senocak 22'; Dreesen 23'; Cekić 33'	Report	Lescano 17', 23'; Navaja 33' (pp)
Penalties
Salihamidžić (penalty missed); Senocak (penalty missed); Cekić (penalty missed); Blum (penalty missed); Blohm (penalty missed)	0–1	(penalty missed) Sánchez; (penalty missed) F. Romero; (penalty missed) Fr. Romero; (penalty scored) Foresto

Kings League Arena Brazil, São Paulo
7 January 2026
19:00 (BRT)

Argentina	3–1	Japan
Martínez 21'; Navaja 28' (pp); L. Sánchez 44'	Report	Miyashita 21'

Kings League Arena Brazil, São Paulo
9 January 2026
19:00 (BRT)

United States	6–10	Germany
Costa 3', 5'; Morales 11'; Núñez 23'; Castro 28' (pp); Bancells 42'	Report	Imsak 14', 25'; Blum 19' (x2); Paul 21'; Cekić 22', 23', 42'; Senocak 35' (sg); Salihamidžić 36' (pen.)

Kings League Arena Brazil, São Paulo
10 January 2026
14:00 (BRT)

Germany	5–4 (g.g.)	Japan
Senocak 3'; Imsak 6'; Cekić 34' (sg), 44'; Salihamidžić 35' (pen.)	Report	Tanabe 19' (x2); Hakozaki 30'; Matsumori 37'

Kings League Arena Brazil, São Paulo
10 January 2026
17:00 (BRT)

Argentina	5–8	United States
F. Romero 4'; Martínez 12'; Sandoval 23'; Navaja 23' (pp); Fr. Romero 32'	Report	Cortés 1'; Bancells 7', 22', 38'; Costa 18' (pen.) (x2), 22', 35'

Kings League Arena Brazil, São Paulo

Tiebreaking shootout

Order	Team	Score
1	Argentina	Martínez (penalty missed); Navaja (penalty missed); Lescano (penalty missed); Foresto (penalty scored); Fr. Romero (penalty scored); Sanchez (penalty missed); Franco R.G (penalty scored); Campari (penalty scored)
2	United States	Costa (penalty scored); Gomes (penalty scored); Mijatovic (penalty missed); Bancells (penalty missed); Morales (penalty scored); Cortés (penalty missed); Costa (penalty scored); Gomes (penalty scored) ---- Costa (penalty missed)
3	Germany	Dressen (penalty missed); Cekić (penalty missed); Senocak (penalty scored); Sejdovic (penalty scored); Salihamidžić (penalty missed); Fofana (penalty scored); Senocak (penalty scored); Senocak (penalty scored) ---- Senocak (penalty scored)

Germany finishes 1st, United States finishes 2nd, and Argentina finishes 3rd

=== Group C ===
Pos	Team	Pld	W	L	GF	GA	GD	Qualification
1	Italy	3	3	0	22	7	+15	Quarterfinals
2	France	3	2	1	14	20	−6	Last-chance round
3	Algeria	3	1	2	17	17	0	
4	Poland	3	0	3	15	24	−9	

Source: Kings League
3 January 2026
14:00 (BRT)

Italy	8–0	France
Perrotti 10' (x2), 21', 21' (pen.), 39' (pen.); Colombo 22'; Lo Faso 24'; Tumblurr 24' (pp)	Report

Kings League Arena Brazil, São Paulo
4 January 2026
15:00 (BRT)

Poland	5–8	Algeria
Jasczczak 20', 22', 40'; Izak 26' (pp); Bienias 31'	Report	Bencherif 20' (x2), 29'; El Mouttaqi 22', 26' (pen.), 35', 42'; Hachemisb 26' (pp)

Kings League Arena Brazil, São Paulo
5 January 2026
18:00 (BRT)

Poland	3–7	Italy
Linca 13'; Jaszczak 22'; Bienias 27'	Report	Rossi 2'; Colombo 23', 34'; Blur 34' (pp); Linca 35' (o.g.); 35' (rp); Perrotti 40'

Kings League Arena Brazil, São Paulo
6 January 2026
18:00 (BRT)

France	5–5	Algeria
Rami 10' (pp); Scaramozzino 16' (pen.), 27' (pen.), 32' (pen.); Lesec 21'	Report	Bencherif 2', 21'; El Afghani 23'; Hachemisb 26' (pp); Ahmed-Kadi 34'
Penalties
Goguey (penalty scored); Martins (penalty scored); Sao (penalty scored)	3–1	(penalty scored) El Mouttaqi; (penalty missed) Ahmed-Kadi; (penalty missed) Zidane; (penalty missed) Haouari

Kings League Arena Brazil, São Paulo
10 January 2026
16:00 (BRT)

France	9–7	Poland
Lessec 1', 22', 39'; Sao 3', 23' (pen.); Imbula 14'; Rami 17' (pp); Goguey 17'; Sano 21'	Report	Linca 2'; Kucharski 10'; Jaszczak 21' (x2), 23'; Bienas 22'; Zapała 38'

Kings League Arena Brazil, São Paulo
11 January 2026
15:00 (BRT)

Italy	7–4	Algeria
Perrotti 7', 28', 34' (pen.); Colombo 21', 22', 23'; Gelsi 38'	Report	Bencherif 2'; Ahmed-Kadi 17'; El Mouttaqi 21', 23'

Kings League Arena Brazil, São Paulo

=== Group D ===
Pos	Team	Pld	W	L	GF	GA	GD	Qualification
1	Spain	3	3	0	20	10	+10	Quarterfinals
2	Brazil (H)	3	2	1	16	14	+2	Last-chance round
3	Qatar	3	1	2	13	16	−3	
4	Peru	3	0	3	10	19	−9	

Source: Kings League
(H) Hosts
3 January 2026
18:00 (BRT)

Brazil	3–7	Spain
Oliveira 1', 23', 26' (pen.)	Report	Nolla; Santos 21', 23'; DjMaRiio 33' (pp); Liñares 41'

Kings League Arena Brazil, São Paulo
4 January 2026
17:00 (BRT)

Qatar	5–4 (g.g.)	Peru
Cheikh Diop 1'; Monegal 16'; Chakiri 21', 31' (pen.), 40'	Report	Ramirez 1'; Pérez 3', 40'; Descalzo 32' (pp)

Kings League Arena Brazil, São Paulo
6 January 2026
19:00 (BRT)

Spain	8–5	Peru
Coll 11', 34'; Nolla 16' (pen.), 43'; Pelaz 19' (x2); Santos 22'; Spursito 34' (pp)	Report	Gálvez 21', 40'; Agnello 22'; Ramirez 23'; Descalzo 23' (pp)

Kings League Arena Brazil, São Paulo
8 January 2026
19:00 (BRT)

Qatar	6–7 (g.g.)	Brazil
Monegal 2', 13' (pen.); Amine El Attac 4'; AboFlah 14' (pp); Chakiri 19' (x2)	Report	Oliveira 1', 20' (pen.) (x2), 43'; Kaká 14' (pp); Dedo 40'; Pinheiro 48'

Kings League Arena Brazil, São Paulo
10 January 2026
18:00 (BRT)

Spain	5–2	Qatar
Nolla (Star player) 20' (pen.), 31'; Lobato 38'	Report	Cheikh Drop 1'; AboFlah 25' (pp)

Kings League Arena Brazil, São Paulo
11 January 2026
18:00 (BRT)

Brazil	6–1	Peru
Garcia 1'; Pinheiro 4', 32'; LuquEt4 6' (pp); Oliveira 7'; Dedo 40'	Report	Descalzo 15' (pp)

Kings League Arena Brazil, São Paulo

=== Group E ===
Pos	Team	Pld	W	L	GF	GA	GD	Qualification
1	Mexico	3	2 (Note: Mexico, Indonesia, and Saudi Arabia were all tied on wins. A tiebreaking triple shootout to take place on 11 January 2025, 20:00 local time. Mexico got first place after successfully scoring 5 goals, then Saudi Arabia got 2nd after beating Indonesia in a tie-breaker for the 2nd place.)	1	35	8	+27	Quarterfinals
2	Saudi Arabia	3	2	1	19	7	+12	Last-chance round
3	Indonesia	3	2	1	10	20	−10	
4	India	3	0	3	6	35	−29	

Source: Kings League
Notes:
3 January 2026
15:00 (BRT)

Mexico	3–4 (g.g.)	Saudi Arabia
Askenazi 1'; O. Martínez 22'; Silva 28'	Report	Alaqeeli 4', 38', 39'; Aroan 13'

Kings League Arena Brazil, São Paulo
4 January 2026
14:00 (BRT)

India	3–5	Indonesia
Mohammed 1'; Khan 4'; Darjee 34'	Report	Fauzan 21', 22', 23'; Yamani 28', 41'

Kings League Arena Brazil, São Paulo
8 January 2026
18:00 (BRT)

India	2–18	Mexico
Bhagatawi 2'; Khan 22'	Report	Monterde 2', 3'; Silva 9', 11'; Kadavath 17' (o.g.); Lara 22'; O. Martínez 22', 32'; Valdez 23', 23'; Dorado 25' (pp); Castillo 26', 43'; Mejia 29'; Askenazi 30', 35'; Junco 36'

Kings League Arena Brazil, São Paulo
9 January 2026
18:00 (BRT)

Saudi Arabia	3–3	Indonesia
Alaqeeli 23' (sg); Aroan 35' (pen.); Drb7h 36' (pp)	Report	Yamani 1'; Dhillon 33' (x2)
Penalties
Saleh (penalty missed); Aldhawyan (penalty missed); Alasari (penalty missed); Aroan (penalty missed)	0–2	(penalty missed) Dilbar; (penalty missed) Yamani; (penalty scored) Aziz; (penalty scored) Permana

Kings League Arena Brazil, São Paulo
10 January 2026
15:00 (BRT)

Mexico	14–2	Indonesia
Askenazi 2', 3', 33', 36'; Valdez 11'; Junco 20' (x2); Silva 21'; Lara 22'; Dorado 27' (pp); O. Martínez 29' (pen.); D. Martínez 33' (pen.); Castillo 36', 40'	Report	Permana 22', 33'

Kings League Arena Brazil, São Paulo
11 January 2026
14:00 (BRT)

Saudi Arabia	12–1	India
Alkarnib 1'; Alaqeeli 3', 21', 35' (pen.), 40'; Alasari 4', 35'; Almaghrabi 11'; Saleh 12'; Aroan 19' (x2); Baabdullah 28'	Report	Bhagawati 15' (sg)

Kings League Arena Brazil, São Paulo

Tiebreaking shootout

Order	Team	Score
1	Saudi Arabia	Alaqeeli (penalty missed); Alharbi (penalty missed); Bin Jubeir (penalty missed); Saleh (penalty missed); Aroan (penalty missed); Alkarnib (penalty missed); Baabdullah (penalty scored); Baabdullah (penalty missed); Alasiri (penalty scored); Alasiri (penalty missed); Aldhaywan (penalty scored); Aldhaywan (penalty missed); Alaqeeli (penalty missed) ---- Aroan (penalty scored); Aroan (penalty missed); Almaghrabi (penalty scored)
2	Mexico	D. Martínez (penalty missed); Sanchez (penalty missed); Askenazi (penalty missed); Lara (penalty scored); O. Martínez (penalty missed); Monterde (penalty scored); Lara (penalty missed); Castillo (penalty missed); Mejia (penalty missed); Silva (penalty missed); Rodriguez (penalty scored); Lara (penalty scored); Monterde (penalty scored)
3	Indonesia	Fauzan (penalty scored); Dhillon (penalty missed); Aziz (penalty missed); Nazil (penalty missed); Fatur (penalty missed); Pasautaya (penalty scored); Permana (penalty missed); Yamani (penalty scored); Fatur (penalty missed); Dilbar (penalty missed); Yamani (penalty missed); Fauzan (penalty missed); Permana (penalty missed) ---- Aziz (penalty missed); Dhillon (penalty missed)

Mexico finishes 1st, Saudi Arabia finishes 2nd

=== Ranking of third placed teams ===
Pos	Grp	Team	Pld	W	L	GF	GA	GD	Qualification
1	B	Argentina	3	2	1	11	12	−1	Last-chance round
2	E	Indonesia	3	2	1	10	20	−10	
3	A	Colombia	3	1	2	15	12	+3	
4	C	Algeria	3	1	2	17	17	0	
5	D	Qatar	3	1	2	13	16	−3	

Source: Kings League

== Knockout stage ==
The last chance round draw was held on 11 January.

Group	Winners	Runners-up	Best 3rd-placed team
A	Chile	Netherlands	—N/a
B	Germany	United States	Argentina
C	Italy	France	—N/a
D	Spain	Brazil	—N/a
E	Mexico	Saudi Arabia	—N/a

=== Bracket ===
Last-chance round (12 January)
Argentina	5
France	7
Saudi Arabia	1
Brazil	7
United States	7
Netherlands	4

Quarterfinals (13-14 January)
Mexico	8
France	4
Italy	5
Brazil	15
Spain	9
United States	3
Chile	8
Germany	5

Semifinals (15 January)
Mexico	3
Brazil	8
Spain	5 (0)
Chile (p)	5 (2)

Final (17 January – Allianz Parque)
Brazil	6
Chile	2

=== Last-chance round ===
12 January 2026
18:00 (BRT)

United States	7–4	Netherlands
Costa 1', 22', 41'; Cortés 2'; Mijatovic 17' (x2); Castro 23' (pp)	Report	Ikeshita 2'; Bouhalhoul 21', 23', 31' (pen.)

Kings League Arena Brazil, São Paulo
12 January 2026
19:00 (BRT)

Argentina	5–7	France
F. Romero 6', 21' (pen.); Sandoval 9'; Navaja 33' (pp); Lescano 43'	Report	Lesec 3'; Ahmin 6'; Lallemand 19' (x2); Sao 22'; Bastos 33' (pp); Martins 44'

Kings League Arena Brazil, São Paulo
12 January 2026
20:00 (BRT)

Saudi Arabia	1–7	Brazil
Almaghrabi 23'	Report	Hugo 1'; Garcia 4', 6'; Pinheiro 15', 22', 39'; Oliviera 24'

Kings League Arena Brazil, São Paulo

=== Quarterfinals ===
13 January 2026
18:00 (BRT)

Mexico	8–4	France
Askenazi 2', 29'; Monterde 2'; Lara 21'; Castillo 23'; Dorado 29' (pp); Sánchez 33'; O. Martínez 44'	Report	Mifsud 1'; Kodjia 8'; Goguey 36'; Martins 44'

Kings League Arena Brazil, São Paulo
13 January 2026
19:00 (BRT)

Italy	5–15	Brazil
Colombo 2'; Marino 21'; Perrotti 23' (pen.); Lo Faso 29', 33'	Report	Hugo 1'; Pinheiro 2', 14', 27'; Cerol 6' (pp); Oliviera 9' (x2), 23', 40'; Mestre 11'; Felipe 18' (x2), 36'; Dedo 30'; Andrade 34'

Kings League Arena Brazil, São Paulo
14 January 2026
18:00 (BRT)

Chile	8–5	Germany
M. Herrera 1'; Rojas 2'; Canales 7' (pp); N. Herrera 14' (x2); Vidangossy 22', 28'; Luna 39'	Report	Salihamidžić 10' (pen.), 21'; Senocak 10' (sg); Cekić 24'; Imsak 28'

Kings League Arena Brazil, São Paulo
14 January 2026
19:00 (BRT)

Spain	9–3	United States
Planas 1'; Nolla 11'; Martí 15'; Liñares 23'; Pelaz 25', 29' (pen.); DjMaRiiO 29' (pp); Lobato 28'; Coll 40'	Report	Costa 1'; Bancells 23'; Castro 24' (pp)

Kings League Arena Brazil, São Paulo

=== Semifinals ===
15 January 2026
18:00 (BRT)

Spain	5–5	Chile
Martí 13'; Liñares 21'; Nolla 22', 23'; Pelaz 33'	Report	M. Herrera 1'; N. Herrera 22', 23', 36' (sg); Vidangossy 24'
Penalties
Nolla (penalty missed); Martí (penalty missed); Pelaz (penalty missed); Liñares (penalty missed)	0–2	(penalty scored) N. Herrera; (penalty missed) Donoso; (penalty scored) Vidangossy

Kings League Arena Brazil, São Paulo
15 January 2026
19:00 (BRT)

Mexico	3–8	Brazil
Castillo 21', 23' (pen.); Dorado 26' (pp)	Report	Hugo 1'; Felipe 17'; D. Martínez 17' (rp); Pinheiro 22', 28', 40'; Vaz 23'; Garcia 26'

Kings League Arena Brazil, São Paulo

=== Final ===
17 January 2026
18:30 (BRT)

Brazil	6–2	Chile
Garcia 2', 36'; Pinheiro 5', 33'; Dedo 8'; Oliviera 38'	Report	N. Herrera 9' (sg); Vidangossy 22'

Allianz Parque, São Paulo

2026 Kings World Cup Nations champions

Brazil
Second title

== Goalscorers ==
There were 395 goals scored in 40 matches, for an average of 9.88 goals per match.

Goals that were worth double due to secret cards will be counted as one goal, and reverse penalties as own goals for the goalscoring statistics.

14 goals

- Lipão Pinheiro

12 goals

- Kelvin Oliveira

10 goals

- Nacho Herrera
- Gabriel Costa

9 goals

- Matteo Perrotti
- Pepe Askenazi
- Gerard Nolla

8 goals

- Abdullah Alaqeeli
- Roc Bancells

7 goals

- Amar Cekić
- Alessandro Colombo
- Genaro Castillo

6 goals

- Haris El Mouttaqi
- Leleti Garcia
- Matías Herrera
- Walid Jaadi
- Norbert Jaszczak

5 goals

- Mathías Vidangossy
- Guillaume Lesec
- Obed Martínez

4 goals

- Amine Bencherif
- Markito Navaja (pp)
- Jhon Palacios
- Serhat Imsak
- Nick Salihamidžić
- Mehmet-Can Senocak
- Alexis Silva
- Escorpión Dorado (pp)
- Ismall Bouhalhoul
- Yuya Ikeshita
- Youssef Chakiri
- Marc Pelaz
- Castro 1021 (pp)

3 goals

- Gonzalo Lescano
- Facu Romero
- Matheus 'Dedo'
- Everton Felipe
- Victor Hugo
- Juan Araya
- David Loaiza
- Moussa Sao
- Anthony Scaramozzino
- Mohammad Fauzan
- Reza Yamani
- Simone Lo Faso
- Martín Lara
- Antonio Monterde
- Carlos 'Camello' Valdez
- Nadir Louah
- Alexis Descalzo (pp)
- Karol Bienias
- Jorge Monegal
- Nawaf Aroan
- Óscar Coll
- Dani Liñares
- Nico Santos

2 goals

- HachemiSB (pp)
- Aaron Martínez
- Tomás Sandoval
- Ezequiel Luna
- Angellot Caro
- Brihan Gutiérrez
- Clément Goguey
- Nicolas Martins
- Adil Rami (pp)
- Soham Bhagawati
- Asif Khan
- Fhandy Permana
- Tumblurr (pp)
- Daviz Junco
- Mohamed Chih
- Ibán Gálvez
- Juan Carlos Pérez
- Erick Ramírez
- Dawid Linca
- Mame Cheik Diop
- AboFlah (pp)
- Moath Alasari
- Abdullah Almaghrabi
- Cristian Lobato
- Aleix Martí
- DjMaRiiO (pp)
- Eduardo 'Pollo' Cortés

1 goal

- Sofiane Ahmed-Kadi
- Boucif El Afghani
- Franco Romero
- Luís Sánchez
- Well Andrade
- Luan 'Mestre'
- Andreas Vaz
- Cerol (pp)
- Kaká (pp)
- LuquEt4 (pp)
- Matías Rojas
- Pedro 'Coloro' Canales (pp)
- Cristian González
- Denilson Lobón
- Mr. Stiven (pp)
- Idir Ahmin
- Giannelli Imbula
- Jonathan Kodjia
- Nassim Lallemand
- Emmanuel Mifsud
- Alseny Sano
- Michel Bastos (pp)
- Danny Blum
- Daniel Dreesen
- Herbert Paul
- Mushraf Muhammed
- Biswa Darjee
- Gurpreet Dhillon
- Alessandro Gelsi
- Niccolò Marino
- Domenico Rossi
- Yuya Hakozaki
- Kensei Matsumori
- Toshiya Miyashita
- Keisuke Shigenobu
- Ryuhei Tanabe
- Junichi Kato (pp)
- Diego Martínez
- Tonatiuh Mejia
- Eddie Sánchez
- Isma Reguia
- Ilias Boudouni
- Jama Telli
- Joe van der Sar
- Randy Wolters
- Chatmo (pp)
- Bruno Agnello
- Kamil Kucharski
- Patryk Zapała
- Izak (pp)
- Mohamed Amine El Attac
- Moayad Alkarnib
- Osama Baabdullah
- Nawaf Saleh
- Drb7h (pp)
- Carles Planas
- Spursito (pp)
- Stefan Mijatovic
- Luiz Morales
- Danny Núñez

1 own goal

- Jishnu Kadavath (against Mexico)
- Diego Martínez (against Brazil)
- Dawid Linca (against Italy)

== Media coverage ==
On 24 December 2025, it was confirmed that Canal 13 would broadcast the tournament in Chile. A few days later, it was also confirmed that DAZN had secured international broadcasting rights for the tournament, as well as for the Spanish, Italian and German versions of the Kings League.
