= Ignacio Herrera =

Chilean footballer (born 1987)

Personal information
- Full name: Ignacio José Herrera Fernández
- Date of birth: 14 October 1987 (age 39)
- Place of birth: Santiago, Chile
- Height: 1.78 m (5 ft 10 in)
- Position: Forward

Youth career
- Universidad de Chile
- Universidad Católica

Senior career*
| Years | Team | Apps | (Gls) |
| 2007–2009 | Universidad Católica | 0 | (0) |
| 2007 | → Rangers (loan) | 32 | (5) |
| 2008–2009 | → Betis B (loan) | 7 | (0) |
| 2010–2011 | Huachipato | 15 | (0) |
| 2011–2012 | Magallanes | 14 | (1) |
| 2013–2015 | Cobreloa | 55 | (7) |
| 2015 | Deportes Iquique | 16 | (3) |
| 2016 | Irtysh Pavlodar | 28 | (3) |
| 2017–2018 | Neftchi Baku | 41 | (12) |
| 2018 | Seoul E-Land | 11 | (1) |
| 2019 | Palestino | 4 | (1) |
| 2020 | Mushuc Runa | 29 | (2) |
| 2021 | Aucas | 10 | (1) |
| 2021 | Lamezia Terme | 4 | (0) |
| 2022–2023 | Barnechea | 41 | (12) |
| 2024 | Deportes Recoleta | 0 | (0) |
| 2024–2025 | Universidad de Concepción | 52 | (9) |
| Total | | 359 | (57) |

International career
| 2026 | Chile (football 7) | 6 | (10) |
- * Club domestic league appearances and goals

Ignacio José Herrera Fernández (born 14 October 1987) is a Chilean former footballer who played as a forward.

== Club career ==
Herrera was trained at Universidad Católica, with a brief stint with Universidad de Chile. He was with Universidad Católica until the age of 22, with stints on loan to Rangers de Talca and the Spanish club Real Betis B.

On 4 August 2015, it was reported that he joined Deportes Iquique.

On 29 February 2016, Herrera signed for Kazakhstan Premier League side Irtysh Pavlodar.

On 3 January 2017, Herrera signed for Azerbaijan Premier League side Neftchi Baku. On 23 April 2017, Herrera scored for Neftchi in a 3–2 defeat to Zira, only for the game to be awarded as a 3–0 victory to Zira two days later after Neftchi Baku fielded 7 foreign players in the match. In October 2017, Herrera extended his contract with Neftchi Baku for another six-months, until the end of the 2017–18 season. During the 2017–18 season Herrera scored 8 goals for Neftchi and became the top goalscorer of the team in the season.

On 29 June 2018, Herrera signed for K League 2 side Seoul E-Land.

In September 2021, he joined Lamezia Terme in the Italian Serie D.

Back in Chile, he joined Barnechea. In 2024, he signed with Deportes Recoleta, but he quit after the second matchday of the Primera B, switching to Universidad de Concepción.

On 31 January 2026, Herrera confirmed his retirement in a tribute previous to the Chilean Primera División match between Universidad de Concepción and Coquimbo Unido.

=== Football 7 ===
He was selected for the Chile squad for the 2026 Kings World Cup Nations under Arturo Vidal as captain. They were the runners-up.

In May 2026, Herrera joined the City Soccer FC football 7 team with views to the 2026 TST Tournament, alongside his countrymen Ezequiel Luna, Santiago Dittborn, Nicolás Castillo, Felipe Seymour, Mathías Vidangossy, Matías Donoso and Juan Araya.

== Personal life ==
Herrera is the son of the former football goalkeeper Fernando Herrera.

As a student, Herrera attended the Athletic Study Center, where athletes such as Marcelo Ríos and Kristel Köbrich also studied.

== Career statistics ==
=== Club ===
As of match played 11 November 2018

Appearances and goals by club, season and competition
| Club | Season | League | | | National Cup | | Continental | | Other | | Total | |
| Club | Season | Division | Apps | Goals | Apps | Goals | Apps | Goals | Apps | Goals | Apps | Goals |
|---|---|---|---|---|---|---|---|---|---|---|---|---|
| Cobreloa | 2013–14 | Chilean Primera División | 29 | 3 | 2 | 0 | – | | – | | 31 | 3 |
| Cobreloa | 2014–15 | Chilean Primera División | 26 | 4 | 0 | 0 | – | | – | | 26 | 4 |
| Cobreloa | Total | | 55 | 7 | 2 | 0 | - | - | - | - | 57 | 7 |
| Deportes Iquique | 2015–16 | Chilean Primera División | 16 | 3 | 2 | 0 | – | | – | | 18 | 3 |
| Irtysh Pavlodar | 2016 | Kazakhstan Premier League | 27 | 3 | 3 | 1 | – | | – | | 30 | 4 |
| Neftchi Baku | 2016–17 | Azerbaijan Premier League | 13 | 4 | 2 | 0 | 0 | 0 | – | | 15 | 4 |
| Neftchi Baku | 2017–18 | Azerbaijan Premier League | 28 | 8 | 5 | 0 | – | | – | | 33 | 8 |
| Neftchi Baku | Total | | 41 | 12 | 7 | 0 | - | - | - | - | 48 | 12 |
| Seoul E-Land | 2018 | K League 2 | 11 | 1 | 0 | 0 | – | | – | | 11 | 1 |
| Career total | | | 150 | 26 | 11 | 1 | 0 | 0 | - | - | 161 | 27 |

== Honours ==
Universidad de Concepción

- Primera B de Chile: 2025
