= Ezequiel Luna =

Argentine footballer

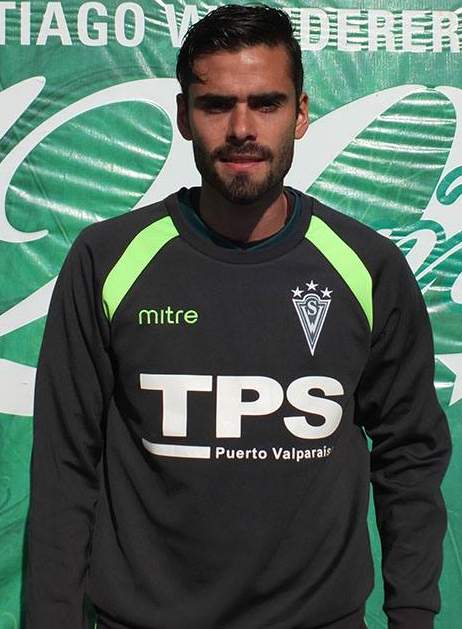
- Luna with Santiago Wanderers in 2014

Personal information
- Full name: Ezequiel Esteban Luna
- Date of birth: 19 November 1986 (age 39)
- Place of birth: Villa Gobernador Gálvez, Argentina
- Height: 1.78 m (5 ft 10 in)
- Position: Defender

Youth career
- Unión Álvarez
- Coronel Aguirre
- Tiro Federal

Senior career*
Years	Team	Apps	(Gls)
2004–2009	Tiro Federal	34	(0)
2007–2008	→ Atlético Tucumán (loan)	31	(0)
2008–2009	→ Tenerife (loan)	0	(0)
2009–2011	Tenerife	54	(1)
2012	LDU Quito	26	(0)
2013–2016	Santiago Wanderers	108	(4)
2016–2017	Palestino	29	(1)
2017–2020	Santiago Wanderers	72	(3)
2021–2022	San Luis	32	(1)
2023	Rangers	25	(4)
2024	Concón National	14	(1)
Total		425	(15)

International career
2026	Chile (football 7)	6	(2)
- * Club domestic league appearances and goals

Ezequiel Esteban Luna (born 19 November 1986) is an Argentine naturalized Chilean former professional footballer who played as a defender.

== Career ==
In 2024, Luna joined Concón National in the Segunda División Profesional de Chile. He left them in August of the same year.

It was confirmed his retirement in November 2025.

== Football 7 ==
Following his retirement from football, Luna joined the Argentine seven-a-side football team Guayo FC and won the Copa Potrero in Argentina. Shortly after, he was selected for the Chile squad for the 2026 Kings World Cup Nations under Arturo Vidal as captain. They were the runners-up.

In February 2026, Luna joined Raniza FC in the Kings League Mexico.

In May 2026, Luna joined the City Soccer FC football 7 team with views to the 2026 TST Tournament, alongside his countrymen Santiago Dittborn, Nicolás Castillo, Felipe Seymour, Mathías Vidangossy, Matías Donoso and Juan Araya.

== Personal life ==
Luna is the son-in-law of the former Argentine footballer Víctor Indio Molina and the brother-in-law of his sons, also footballers. Braian, the older, has played in Argentina and abroad and the younger has played for Comunicaciones.

Luna naturalized Chilean by residence. He also holds Spanish nationality.

== Honors ==
Santiago Wanderers

- Copa Chile: 2017
- Primera B de Chile: 2019

Guayo FC

- Copa Potrero: 2025
