= Dittborn =

Dittborn is a surname. Notable people with the surname include:

- Carlos Dittborn (1924–1962), Chilean football administrator
- Santiago Dittborn (born 1992), Chilean footballer
