= Gárate =

Gárate is a Spanish surname. Notable people with the surname include:

- Alba Gárate, better known by her stage name Lantana (born 1980), Spanish singer, songwriter, musician, producer, and actress
- Francisco Gárate (1907–1986), Spanish footballer
- Francisco Gárate Aranguren (1857–1929), Spanish Catholic professed religious of the Jesuit order
- Jorge Gárate (1917–1990), Argentine film editor
- José Emilio Amavisca Gárate (born 1971), Spanish retired professional footballer
- José Eulogio Gárate (born 1944), Spanish former professional footballer
- Juan José Gárate (1869–1939), Spanish painter
- Juan Manuel Gárate (born 1976), Spanish professional road racing cyclist
- María Begoña Aranguren Gárate (born 1949), Spanish journalist and writer
- Piero Gárate (born 1992), Chilean professional footballer
- Víctor Gárate (born 1984), Venezuelan former professional baseball pitcher
