= Fernando Herrera =

Fernando Herrera may refer to:

- Fernando Herrera (bishop) (died 1518), Italian Roman Catholic bishop
- Fernando Herrera (Chilean footballer) (born 1954), Chilean footballer
- Fernando Herrera (Mexican footballer) (born 1985), Mexican footballer
- Fernando Herrera Mamani (died 2021), Peruvian politician
- Fernando Herrera Ávila, Mexican politician
