= Luis Pacheco =

Luis Pacheco may refer to:

- Luis Alberto Pacheco (born 1968), Venezuelan football manager
- Luis Pacheco (director), Panamanian director, co-director of the 2019 film Operation Just Cause
- Luis Pacheco (footballer, born 1992), Chilean footballer
- Luis Pacheco (footballer, born 2008), Brazilian footballer
- Luis Pacheco (slave) (1800–1895), Afro-Spanish enslaved person
- Luis Pacheco de Narváez (1570–1640), Spanish writer
