= Tomás Díaz (Chilean footballer) =

Chilean footballer (born 1992)

Personal information
- Full name: Tomás Andrés Díaz Navarrete
- Date of birth: 8 January 1992 (age 34)
- Place of birth: Santiago, Chile
- Height: 1.90 m (6 ft 3 in)
- Position: Defender

Youth career
- 2001–2010: Universidad Católica
- 2010–2011: Triestina

Senior career*
Years	Team	Apps	(Gls)
2011	Triestina		
2011–2012	Union Saint-Gilloise	9	(0)
2012	→ Honvéd II (loan)	1	(0)
2012	CA Fénix		
2013	Unión San Felipe	8	(0)
- * Club domestic league appearances and goals

Tomás Andrés Díaz Navarrete (born 8 January 1992) is a Chilean former professional footballer who played as a defender for clubs in Europe, Uruguay and Chile.

== Career ==
As a member of the Universidad Católica youth ranks, where he coincided with Santiago Dittborn, Díaz won the national titles at under-16, under-17 and under-19 levels. After rejecting a professional contract with them, he emigrated to Europa and joined Italian side Triestina in 2010.

In 2011, he switched to Belgium and joined Union Saint-Gilloise, being loaned to Hungarian side Honvéd in 2012. In January 2012, he also had a trial with Manchester City.

On second half 2012, he returned to South America and joined Uruguayan Primera División club CA Fénix.

In 2013, he returned to his homeland and played for Unión San Felipe until the end of the season.

== Personal life ==
Díaz holds Italian citizenship since his grandmother is an Italian who was born in Genoa and came to Chile after the World War II.

Following his retirement, he attended Andrés Bello University and got a degree in business administration.
