= Christian Vilches =

Chilean footballer (born 1983)

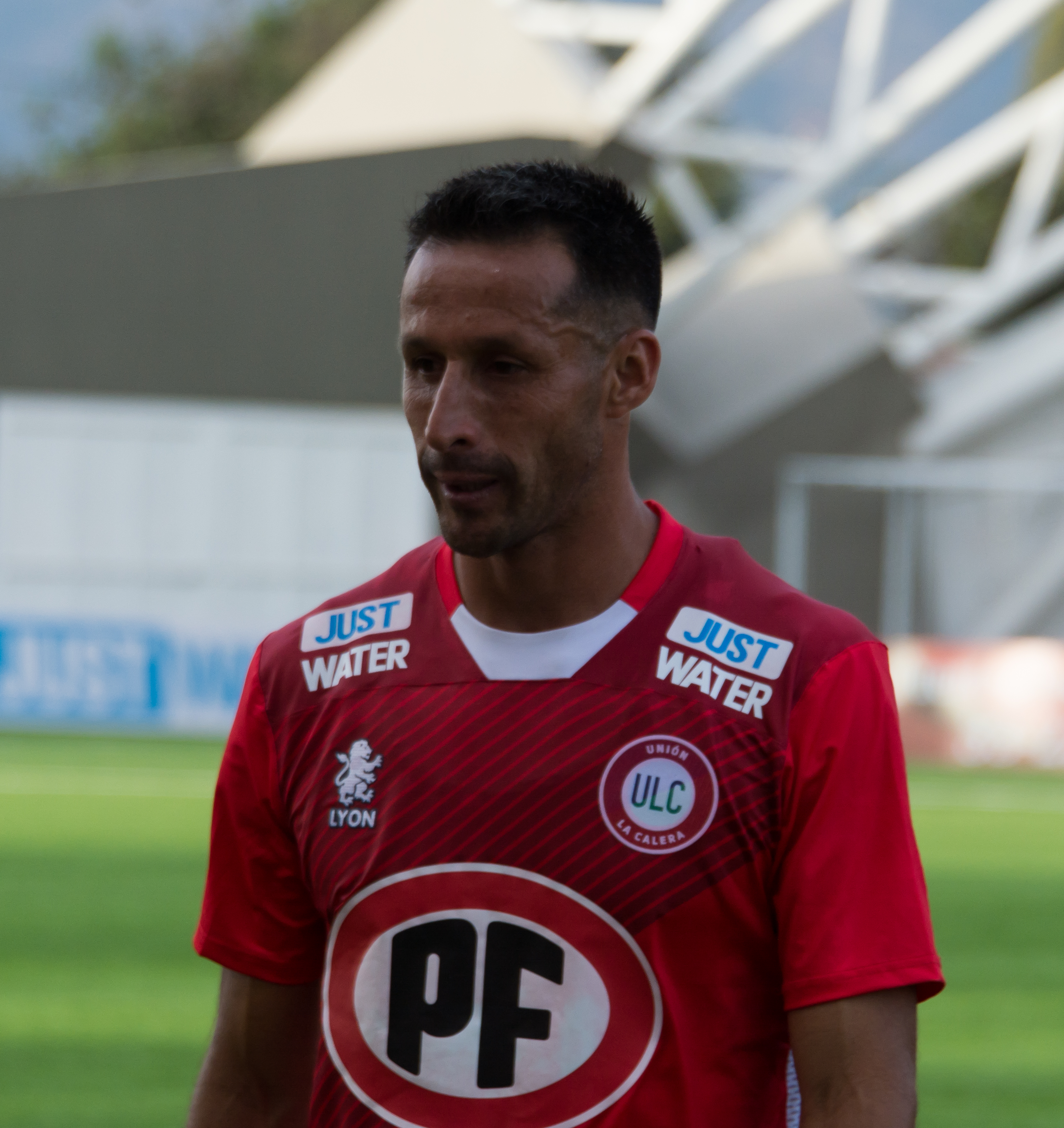
- Vilches with Unión La Calera in 2019

Personal information
- Full name: Christian Alberto Vilches González
- Date of birth: 13 July 1983 (age 43)
- Place of birth: Santiago, Chile
- Height: 1.82 m (6 ft 0 in)
- Position: Centre back

Youth career
- Deportes Quilicura

Senior career*
| Years | Team | Apps | (Gls) |
| 2002–2003 | Deportes Quilicura | – | (–) |
| 2004–2008 | Palestino | 127 | (7) |
| 2005 | → Unión La Calera (loan) | 1 | (0) |
| 2009–2011 | Audax Italiano | 91 | (4) |
| 2011–2015 | Colo-Colo | 141 | (3) |
| 2015–2016 | Atlético Paranaense | 21 | (1) |
| 2016–2018 | Universidad de Chile | 61 | (1) |
| 2019–2022 | Unión La Calera | 103 | (6) |
| 2023 | Magallanes | 24 | (1) |
| Total | | 569 | (23) |

International career
| 2011–2015 | Chile | 2 | (0) |
| 2026 | Chile (football 7) | 5 | (0) |
- * Club domestic league appearances and goals

Christian Alberto Vilches González (Note: In this Spanish name, the first or paternal surname is Vilches and the second or maternal family name is González.) (born 13 July 1983), known as Christian Vilches, is a Chilean former professional footballer who played as a central defender.

== Club career ==
=== Palestino ===
Vilches began his career at Deportes Quilicura, a humble club of his country's third division. In 2004, he signed with Palestino, a club of the professional first division. He made his professional debut against Unión San Felipe and scored his first goal in the professional football against Cobresal in a 3–3 draw.

In 2005, the player was loaned to Unión La Calera, where he remained until June of the following year before returning to the Colony Club. After an unremarkable year in 2007, in the following season Vilches was part of his club's historic season, where the team advanced to the 2008 Clausura final.

=== Audax Italiano ===
After his successful participation with Palestino, it was reported that Colo-Colo, one of the Big Three of Chilean football, was interested in him, but he finally joined Audax Italiano. The player scored 2 goals in 39 matches during the season, being a key player in the team's scheme. In the following season, after an irregular tournament start, Vilches had a good season with The Italians, being a starter in every match, and was nominated in the Chilean team of the year. He played a total of 36 games and scored 2 goals during the season.

=== Colo-Colo ===
After several rumors of Vilches' incorporation to Colo-Colo, his signing was confirmed, and he was introduced as club's new player on 23 June 2011.

=== Last years ===
His last club was Magallanes in 2023.

== Football 7 ==
As a seven-a-side football player, Viclhes was selected for the Chile squad for the 2026 Kings World Cup Nations under Arturo Vidal as captain. They were the runners-up.
