= Kings World Cup Nations =

- Organiser(s): Kings League
- Founded: 2024
- Region: International
- Teams: 20
- Current champions: Brazil (2nd title)
- Most championships: Brazil (2 titles)
- Broadcaster: DAZN
- 2026 Kings World Cup Nations

The Kings World Cup Nations is an international seven-a-side football tournament based on the Kings League format created by Gerard Piqué and Ibai Llanos. Unlike the Kings World Cup Clubs launched in 2024, which is a club competition, this tournament features teams to represent their respective nations, similar to the FIFA's World Cup.

== History ==
=== 2025 ===
Before the start of the 2025 season, the Kings World Cup Nations was announced, this time with national teams. During the launch event for the Kings League Italy on 18 November 2024, it was confirmed that Italy would be hosting the tournament from 1 to 12 January 2025, with the finals taking place in Turin's Juventus Stadium.

The Kings World Cup Nations officially began on 1 January 2025, with Japan beating hosts Italy 3-1 in the opening match. The majority of the matches were held in Milan. The final was held at the Juventus Stadium, where Brazil became the champion after defeating Colombia 2-6.

=== 2026 ===
On 11 June 2025, after the Kings World Cup Clubs Round of 16 match between Dendele FC and Desimpedidos Goti, it was announced in a video featuring Kings League Brazil chairmen that the 2nd edition of the Kings World Cup Nations will be held in São Paulo in January 2026.

== Format ==
=== 2025 ===
For the 2025 edition, it featured a swiss-system tournament format.

First stage

- In the first round, the 16 teams each play one match, with the pairings decided by a random draw with no restrictions.
- All teams advance to the second round, with the teams that won their first-round match going to a 'winner bracket', and the teams that lost going to a 'loser bracket'.
- The winners of the 'winner bracket' advance to the knockout stage, while the losing teams face the winning teams from the 'loser bracket' in a 'last-chance' round. The winners of the last-chance round secure the remaining places to the knockout stage.

Knockout stage

- The knockout stage consists of quarterfinals, semifinals and a final.

=== 2026 ===
For the 2026 edition, with the expansion to 20 teams, the format changed to a group stage and knockout stage.

Group stage

- The 20 teams drawn to 5 groups of 4.
- The group winners advance straight to the quarterfinals, while the runners-up and the best third placed teams enter the last chance round.

Knockout stage

- The knockout stage consists of the last chance round, quarterfinals, semifinals, and the final.

== Broadcast ==
The entire tournament is livestreamed on Twitch, YouTube and Kick, both from the official Kings League channels and individual feeds from the teams' chairpersons.

== Top scorers ==
N°	Name	Team	Goals	Games played	Seasons
1	Kelvin Oliveira	(Brazil)	31	12	2
2	Lipao Pinheiro	(Brazil)	14	12	2
3	Obed Martínez	(Mexico)	13	10	2
4	Nadir Louah	(Morocco)	12	8	2
5	Gabriel Costa	(United States)	10	5	1
5	Ignacio Herrera	(Chile)	10	6	1
7	Pepe Askenazi	(Mexico)	9	5	1
7	Matteo Perrotti	(Italy)	9	4	1
7	Gerard Nolla	(Spain)	9	5	1

== Top assists ==
N°	Name	Team	Assists	Games played	Seasons
1	Angellot Caro	(Colombia)	9	8	2
2	Mathías Vidangossy	(Chile)	8	6	1
2	Fuad El Amrani	(Morocco)	8	8	2
4	Lipao Pinheiro	(Brazil)	8	12	2
5	Obed Martínez	(Mexico)	7	10	2
6	Eduardo Cortés	(United States)	5	8	2
6	Antonio Monterde	(Mexico)	5	10	2
6	Kelvin Oliveira	(Brazil)	5	12	2

== Individual awards ==
Year	MVP	Most "MVP of the match"	Most dribbles	Best goalkeeper	Top scorer	Top assists	MVP of the final
2025	(Brazil) Kelvin Oliveira	(Brazil) Kelvin Oliveira (5)	(Uzbekistan) Shakhriyor Jabborov (29)	(Colombia) Camilo Mena	(Brazil) Kelvin Oliveira (19)	(Morocco) Fuad El Amrani (5)	(Brazil) Kelvin Oliveira
2026	(Brazil) Kelvin Oliveira	(Brazil) Kelvin Oliveira (4)	(Germany) Amar Cekić (19)	(Chile) Matías Herrera	(Brazil) Lipao Pinheiro (14)	(Chile) Mathías Vidangossy (8)	(Brazil) Leleti García

== Results ==
Ed.	Year	Hosts	Final			Semi-finalists	Number of teams
Ed.	Year	Hosts	Champions	Score	Runners-up	Semi-finalists	Number of teams
1	2025	Italy	Brazil	6–2	Colombia	Morocco Mexico	16
2	2026	Brazil	Brazil	6–2	Chile	Spain Mexico	20

=== Teams reaching the final ===
Team	Titles	Runners-up	Editions won	Editions runner-up
Brazil	2	0	2025, 2026	
Colombia	0	1		2025
Chile	0	1		2026

== See also ==
- Kings League
- Kings World Cup Clubs
