= Sebastián Domínguez (Chilean footballer) =

Chilean footballer (born 1987)

Personal information
- Full name: Sebastián Isaías Domínguez Monteiro
- Date of birth: 5 December 1987 (age 38)
- Place of birth: Santiago, Chile
- Height: 1.71 m (5 ft 7 in)
- Position: Midfielder

Team information
- Current team: Deportes Temuco (youth)

Senior career*
Years	Team	Apps	(Gls)
2007–2009	Audax Italiano	1	(0)
2010–2013	Unión Temuco	107	(5)
2013–2022	Deportes Temuco	155	(1)
2013–2014	→ Rangers (loan)	19	(0)
2023	Provincial Osorno	10	(0)
Total		292	(6)

Managerial career
- 2024–: Deportes Temuco (youth)
- 2024: Deportes Temuco (assistant)
- 2026: Deportes Temuco (caretaker)
- * Club domestic league appearances and goals

Sebastián Isaías Domínguez Monteiro (born 5 December 1987) is a former Chilean footballer who played as a midfielder.

== Playing career ==
His last club was Provincial Osorno in 2023.

At international level, he was part of a Chile under-25 squad in a training session led by Claudio Borghi in May 2011, alongside his teammates in Unión Temuco, Leonardo Ruiz and Matías Donoso.

== Coaching career ==
In March 2024, Domínguez joined Deportes Temuco as coach of the under-13's. On 20 October of the same year, he became the assistant of the interim coach of the first team, Esteban Valencia.
