= 2023 National Amateur Cup =

99th edition of cup competition in American soccer

2023 USASA National Amateur Cup
Tournament details
- Country: United States
- Teams: 41

Final positions
- Champions: MesoAmerica-San Carlos FC
- Runners-up: Newtown Pride FC

Tournament statistics
- Matches played: 45
- Goals scored: 239 (5.31 per match)

The 2023 National Amateur Cup is the 99th edition of the National Amateur Cup, a knockout cup competition open to amateur teams affiliated with the United States Adult Soccer Association (USASA). It will be the fifth edition of the tournament to award its champion a spot in the U.S. Open Cup.

Bavarian United SC are the defending National Amateur Cup champion.

== Format ==
All four regions of the USASA will hold amateur cup tournaments to crown champions, which would then qualify for the final tournament. Qualification for these tournaments is determined individually by each region. The final four teams then compete in a single location knockout tournament to crown a national champion, with an additional game in place to determine both third and fourth place.

== Region I ==
Nine state associations in USASA Region I sent representatives to the tournament for the Fritz Marth Amateur Cup. The final of the regional tournament took place on June 17 at the Ukrainian American Sports Center in North Wales, Pennsylvania.

First round

April 2	**West Chester United SC (Pennsylvania)**	**4–0**	**(Delaware)** Albion SC	West Chester, Pennsylvania
2:00 PM (EDT)	Ridge Robinson 10' (pen.); George New 31'; Kenneth Roby 54'; Thomas King 70'	Report		Stadium: Delacy Soccer Park

Bracket

Home teams listed on top of bracket

Quarterfinals; April 23
CT	**Newtown Pride FC**	**3**
NY	Pancyprian-Freedoms	2
**North**
MA	**GPS Omens**	**FF**
NJ	Jackson Lions FC
PA	West Chester United SC	1
MD	**Sure Sports FC**	**4**
**South**
VA	**Northern Virginia FC**	**8**
PA	Appalachia Steel FC	2

Semifinals; May 21
CT	**Newtown Pride FC**	**0(5)**
MA	GPS Omens	0(4)
MD	**Sure Sports FC**	**3**
VA	Northern Virginia FC	0

Final; June 17
CT	**Newtown Pride FC**	**7**
MD	Sure Sports FC	0

Bold = winner
* = after extra time, ( ) = penalty shootout score, FF = forfeit

== Region II ==
In total, 20 teams across eight states signed up to compete in the tournament for the Bill Davey Amateur Cup The Midwest Premier League (MWPL) is the most represented league in the region with nine teams participating, followed by the Wisconsin Soccer Leagues (WSL) with five teams. Illinois is the most represented state in the tournament with eight teams taking part. Dakota Young Stars FC, a WSL team, is listed on the Region II website as a Wisconsin team. However, the team is based out of Sioux Falls, South Dakota and is listed as such on this page.

Four of the participating teams received byes into the Quarterfinals of the competition. This included the 2022 divisional champions from the MWPL (Inter Detroit, Bavarian United SC, and best runner-up RWB Adria replacing the not competing Ajax St. Louis) and Ohio Valley Premier League (Fort Wayne Sports Club - 1927 SC).

Teams win $300 for every knockout round game they win. An additional prize of $1,000 is awarded to the regional champion.

Bracket

Home teams listed on top of bracket

First Round; April 23
WI	Bateaux FC	3
WI	**Honduras FC Majors**	**4**
MN	**Vlora FC**	**FF**
SD	Dakota Young Stars FC

Round of 16; May 13
WI	**Honduras FC Majors**	**1**
MN	Vlora FC	0

Bold = winner
* = after extra time, ( ) = penalty shootout score, FF = forfeit

Home teams listed on top of bracket

First Round; April 18/21
WI	**United Serbians SC**	**2**
IL	Chicago House AC	1
IL	**Edgewater Castle FC**	**4**
IL	NK Armada Chicago	1

Round of 16; May 21
WI	**United Serbians SC**	**3**
IL	Edgewater Castle FC	1

Bold = winner
* = after extra time, ( ) = penalty shootout score

Home teams listed on top of bracket

First Round; April 16/18
IL	Steel City FC	2(2)
IL	**Schwaben AC**	**2(4)**
IL	**Czarni Jaslo Chicago**	**7**
IL	Talara FC	0

Round of 16; May 3
IL	Schwaben AC	1
IL	**Czarni Jaslo Chicago**	**2**

Bold = winner
* = after extra time, ( ) = penalty shootout score

Home teams listed on top of bracket

First Round; April 22/29
MI	Teranga Lions	2
OH	**Valhalla FC**	**3**
KS	**FC Porto of Kansas**	**3**
KS	Focus FC	1

Round of 16; May 21
OH	**Valhalla FC**	**4**
KS	FC Porto of Kansas	2

Bold = winner
* = after extra time, ( ) = penalty shootout score

Home teams listed on top of bracket

Quarterfinals; May 23, June 4/7/11
WI	**Bavarian United SC**	**3**
WI	Honduras FC Majors	0
MI	Inter Detroit	0
WI	**United Serbians SC**	**2**
IL	**RWB Adria**	**2(5)**
IL	Czarni Jaslo Chicago	2(3)
IN	**Fort Wayne Sport Club**	**2**
OH	Valhalla FC	1

Semifinals; June 24/July 6
WI	**Bavarian United SC**	**2**
WI	United Serbians SC	1
IL	**RWB Adria**	**4**
IN	Fort Wayne Sport Club	0

Final; July 15
WI	Bavarian United SC	2
IL	**RWB Adria**	**4**

Bold = winner
* = after extra time, ( ) = penalty shootout score

== Region III ==
Region III held its tournament on June 9–11 at Carpenter Park in Plano, Texas. Ten teams across six states (five state associations and the National Premier Soccer League) took part with five participants coming from state the state of Texas (three from Texas North and two from Texas South).

Unlike the other regions, Region III separated its entrants into groups with each playing three games over two days. Teams in Group C, which had four members, played a round robin against one another. Teams in groups A and B, which had three members each, played against members of the opposing groups. The highest finishing team from each of the three groups and the highest placing runner-up advanced to Sunday morning's semifinal round. The Region III Amateur Cup Final took place immediately after on Sunday afternoon.

The points for group standings are as follows: 6 points for a win, 1 point for a shutout, 0 points for the loss, 1 point for each goal scored up to three goals, 3 points for a tie.

The Saturday evening group stage match between Xolos PV Laredo and Sharks FCA was abandoned late in the second half and not completed. Members of the Sharks team accused Xolos of using a racial slur against one of their players. Sharks were leading 5-3 at the time and the result stood.

Group A

Pos	Team	Pld	W	D	L	GF	GA	GD	Pts	Final result
1	(Oklahoma) Tulsa Athletic	3	1	1	1	6	8	−2	**15**	Advance to semifinals
2	(Texas) Xolos PV Laredo	3	0	0	3	3	15	−12	**5**	
3	(Texas) DFW United FC	3	0	0	3	1	34	−33	**1**	

Source: Match reports
Rules for classification: 1) points; 2) head to head; 3) goal differential [capped at a 3-goal differential]; 4) goals for [capped at 5 goals]; 5) penalty shootout

Group B

Pos	Team	Pld	W	D	L	GF	GA	GD	Pts	Final result
1	(North Carolina) Tobacco Road FC	3	3	0	0	27	2	+25	**28**	Advance to semifinals
2	Sharks FCA of Florida	3	2	1	0	20	7	+13	**25**	Advance to semifinals
3	(Texas) Santos FC	3	2	0	1	10	3	+7	**17**	

Source: Match reports
Rules for classification: 1) points; 2) head to head; 3) goal differential [capped at a 3-goal differential]; 4) goals for [capped at 5 goals]; 5) penalty shootout

Home \ Away	TUL	XPV	DFW	TOB	SFL	SAN
Tulsa Athletic	—				4–4	1–0
Xolos PV Laredo		—		1–8	3–5	
DFW United FC			—	0–15		1–8
Tobacco Road FC	4–1			—		
Sharks FCA of Florida			11–0		—	
Santos FC		2–1				—

Source: Match reports
Legend: Blue = home team win; Yellow = draw; Red = away team win.

Group C

Pos	Team	Pld	W	D	L	GF	GA	GD	Pts	Final result
1	(Texas) ASC New Stars	3	3	0	0	21	1	+20	**29**	Advance to semifinals
2	(Georgia (U.S. state)) Cobb United FC	3	2	0	1	11	10	+1	**19**	
3	(Texas) Ice FC/Black Ice	3	1	0	2	7	17	−10	**12**	
4	(Georgia (U.S. state)) Kader Boys FC	3	0	0	3	3	14	−11	**3**	

Source: Match reports
Rules for classification: 1) points; 2) head to head; 3) goal differential [capped at a 3-goal differential]; 4) goals for [capped at 5 goals]; 5) penalty shootout

Home \ Away	ASC	COB	ICE	KAD
ASC Newstars	—	8–0		6–0
Cobb United FC		—	7–2	4–0
Ice FC/Black Ice	1–7		—	
Kader Boys			3–4	—

Source: Match reports
Legend: Blue = home team win; Yellow = draw; Red = away team win.

Knockout Stage

Home teams listed on top of bracket

Semifinal; June 11
A1	**Tulsa Athletic**	**3(6)**
C1	ASC New Stars	3(5)
B1	**Tobacco Road FC**	**4***
WC	Sharks FCA of Florida	1

Final; June 11
A1	Tulsa Athletic	2
B1	**Tobacco Road FC**	**4**

Bold = winner
* = after extra time, ( ) = penalty shootout score, FF = forfeit

== Region IV ==
The Region IV Amateur Cup took place on Friday, July 7 at Ventura College in Ventura, California. Only two teams competed; MesoAmerica FC (Cal South Adult Men's State Cup champions) and Napa Valley 1839 FC of the National Premier Soccer League.

MesoAmerica received $300 in prize money for winning the final.

July 7	MesoAmerica FC (California)	2–0	(California) Napa Valley 1839 FC	Ventura, California
7:00 PM (PDT)	German Alfaro 5', 40'	Report		Stadium: Ventura College

== National Amateur Cup Finals ==
The national finals took place on August 4 and 5 at the TBK Bank Complex in Bettendorf, Iowa.

Semifinal; August 4
R2	RWB Adria	1
R1	**Newtown Pride FC**	**2***
R4	**MesoAmerica FC**	**2**
R3	Tobacco Road FC	1

Final; August 5
R1	Newtown Pride FC	1
R4	**MesoAmerica FC**	**2**

Bold = winner
* = after extra time, ( ) = penalty shootout score, FF = forfeit

National Semifinals

August 4 Semifinal	RWB Adria **(Illinois)**	**1–2** (a.e.t.)	**(Connecticut) Newtown Pride FC**	Bettendorf, Iowa
7:00 PM (CDT)	Miloš Vučić 49' (pen.)	Report	Felipe Dutra 71'; Gabriel Ganzer 117'	Stadium: TBK Bank Complex, Field 7

August 4 Semifinal	**MesoAmerica-San Carlos FC (California)**	**2–1**	**(North Carolina)** Tobacco Road FC	Bettendorf, Iowa
7:00 PM (CDT)	Piero Gárate; Bryan Medina	Report	Eric Chavez	Stadium: TBK Bank Complex, Field 8

National Amateur Cup Final

August 5 Final	Newtown Pride FC **(Connecticut)**	**1–2**	**(California) MesoAmerica-San Carlos FC**	Bettendorf, Iowa
7:00 PM (CDT)	Erik Lorent 2'	Report	Bryan Medina 1'; German Alfaro 46'	Stadium: TBK Bank Complex, Field 7
