= Jorge Ghiso =

Argentine footballer and manager

Jorge Luis Ghiso (born June 21, 1951, in Buenos Aires, Argentina) is an Argentine football manager and former Argentine footballer who played for clubs in Argentina, Chile, Mexico, Colombia and Spain.

== Playing career ==
=== Teams (Player) ===
- (Argentina) River Plate 1970–1975
- (Argentina) Atlético Tucumán 1975
- Universidad de Chile 1976–1978
- (Argentina) Estudiantes de La Plata 1979
- (Mexico) Estudiantes Tecos 1979–1980
- (Argentina) Atlético Tucumán 1980
- (Colombia) Unión Magdalena 1981
- (Spain) Rayo Vallecano 1982–1983
- (Colombia) Unión Magdalena 1983
- (Chile) Everton 1984–1985

=== International career ===
Ghiso was a member of the Argentine national team under Omar Sívori and made appearances in the matches previous to the 1974 FIFA World Cup in Mexico, Germany and Israel. He couldn't be a member of the final squad due to the fact that he suffered an anterior cruciate ligament injury.

== Teams (Coach) ==
- (Argentina) Deportivo Laferrere 1988–1989
- (Argentina) Atlanta 1992–1993
- (Argentina) Instituto de Córdoba 1993–1994
- (Argentina) Atlanta 1995
- (Argentina) Instituto de Córdoba 1996
- (Argentina) Atlanta 1997
- (Argentina) Atlético Rafaela 1997–1998
- (Argentina) Deportivo Español 1998–1999
- (Argentina) Cipolletti 1999
- (Argentina) Atlético Rafaela 2001–2002
- (Argentina) Atlético Rafaela 2006–2007
- (Argentina) Instituto de Córdoba 2007–2009
- (Argentina) Ferro Carril Oeste 2009
- (Argentina) Quilmes 2010
- (Argentina) Independiente Rivadavia 2011
- (Argentina) Atlanta 2011–2012
- (Chile) Audax Italiano 2013
- (Argentina) Talleres de Córdoba 2014

== Titles (Player) ==
- River Plate 1975 (Primera División Argentina Championship (Nacional and Metropolitana))
- Universidad de Chile 1976 (Copa Sudamericana de Clubes Universitarios)

== Personal life ==
His son, Jorge Ignacio, is a fitness coach who has worked along with him.

He is nicknamed Vitrola (Gramophone) since he was a youth player of River Plate due to the fact that he used to speak a lot.

A well-known player of Universidad de Chile, he developed a close friendship with his teammates Arturo Salah, Manuel Pellegrini, Johnny Ashwell and Fernando Herrera.
