= Piero Gárate =

Chilean footballer (born 1992)

Personal information
- Full name: Piero Alejandro Gárate Rojas
- Date of birth: 24 May 1992 (age 34)
- Place of birth: Valparaíso, Chile
- Height: 1.72 m (5 ft 8 in)
- Position: Defensive midfielder

Team information
- Current team: Platense FC

Youth career
- Santiago Wanderers

Senior career*
Years	Team	Apps	(Gls)
2008–2014	Santiago Wanderers	9	(0)
2013–2014	→ Deportes Concepción (loan)	26	(0)
2014–2015	Deportes Concepción	30	(1)
2015–2016	Trasandino	21	(1)
2017–2018	Miramar Misiones	27	(1)
2019	Presidente Hayes	–	(–)
2020–2021	Deportes Puerto Montt	14	(0)
2021	San Marcos	20	(0)
2022	Los Jerrys (football 7)	–	(–)
2023	Borussia NOLA	–	(–)
2023	Mesoamérica San Carlos	–	(–)
2025	Concón National	16	(0)
2026–	Platense FC	0	(0)

International career^{‡}
2007	Chile U15		
2008–2009	Chile U17		
2010	Chile U20 (futsal)		
2026	Chile (football 7)	6	(0)
- * Club domestic league appearances and goals as of 23 July 2026 ‡ National team caps and goals as of 10 February 2026

Piero Alejandro Gárate Rojas (born 24 May 1992) is a Chilean professional footballer who plays as a defensive midfielder for Platense FC in the Liga Nacional de Fútbol de Honduras.

== Club career ==
A product of Santiago Wanderers youth system, he played for the team in both Primera B and Chilean Primera División. Then, he played for Deportes Concepción and Trasandino.

From 2017 to 2019 he played abroad for both Miramar Misiones in Uruguay and Presidente Hayes in Paraguay.

In the 2020 season, he played for Deportes Puerto Montt, with whom Gárate has had legal issues since the club did not take responsibility for a serious injury that he suffered while he was a player of it.

In 2021, he played for San Marcos de Arica.

In 2023, he moved to the United States to play for amateur clubs such as Borussia NOLA and Mesoamérica San Carlos FC, also taking part in the National Amateur Cup.

In July 2026, Gárate and his countryman Luis Pacheco moved to Honduras and joined Platense FC in the Liga Nacional de Fútbol.

== Football 7 ==
In 2022, Gárate played for the seven-a-side football club Los Jerrys, winning the national championship.

He was selected for the Chile squad for the 2026 Kings World Cup Nations under Arturo Vidal as captain. They were the runners-up.

== International career ==
Gárate represented Chile at under-15 level in the 2007 South American Championship. Then he took part of the Chile U17 squad between 2008 and 2009.

In addition, Gárate was a Chile under-20 international futsal player, making appearances in the 2018 South American Championship in Colombia.
