= Matías Donoso =

Chilean footballer (born 1986)

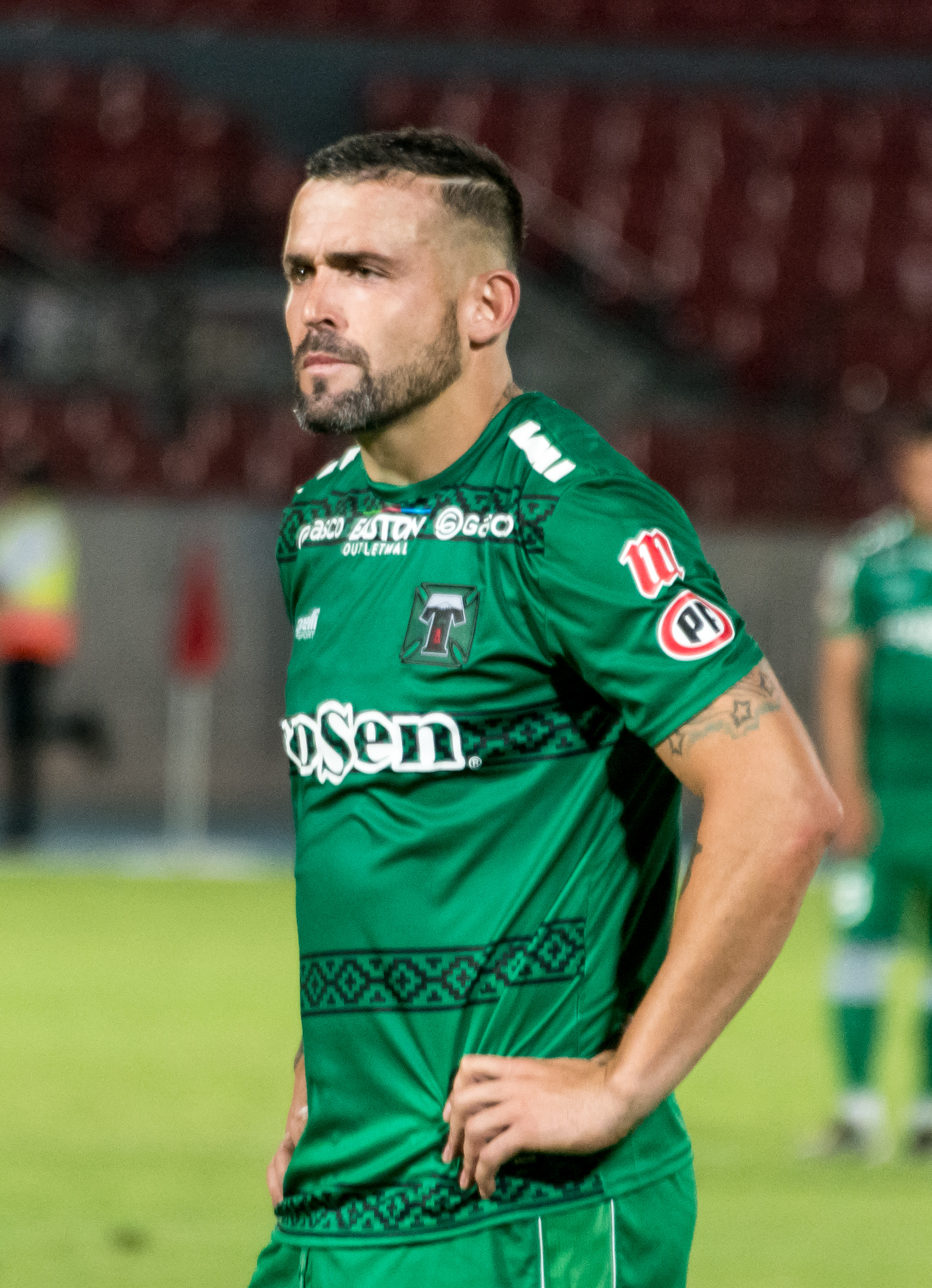
- Donoso with Deportes Temuco in 2020

Personal information
- Full name: Jorge Matías Donoso Gárate
- Date of birth: 8 July 1986 (age 40)
- Place of birth: Temuco, Chile
- Height: 1.84 m (6 ft 0 in)
- Position: Striker

Team information
- Current team: Colchagua

Youth career
- Unión Victoria

Senior career*
Years	Team	Apps	(Gls)
2005–2006	Luis Matte Larraín	–	(–)
2007	Instituto Nacional	–	(–)
2008–2012	Unión Temuco	90	(28)
2013	Santiago Wanderers	28	(11)
2014	Everton	15	(6)
2014–2015	Cobresal	30	(13)
2015	Al-Shaab	10	(0)
2016	Patronato	8	(1)
2016–2022	Deportes Temuco	61	(17)
2019	→ Deportes Iquique (loan)	17	(10)
2020–2021	→ Deportes Iquique (loan)	26	(6)
2021	→ Cobresal (loan)	20	(6)
2022–2023	O'Higgins	23	(3)
2023–2024	Universidad de Concepción	26	(7)
2025	San Luis	6	(0)
2025	Deportes Temuco	14	(2)
2026	City Soccer (football 7)	3	(0)
2026–	Colchagua	0	(0)

International career
2026	Chile (football 7)	6	(0)
- * Club domestic league appearances and goals as of 27 July 2026

Jorge Matías Donoso Gárate (born July 8, 1986), known as Matías Donoso, is a Chilean footballer who plays as a striker for Colchagua.

== Career ==
Donoso was with Unión Victoria from San José de Maipo before starting his career at the Chilean Tercera División playing for Luis Matte Larraín, Instituto Nacional and Unión Temuco. In 2007, he was awarded as the best player of the division by Círculo de Periodistas Deportivos de Chile (Trade of Sports Journalists of Chile).

On second half 2015, Donoso played for Emirati club Al-Shaab in the UAE Pro League. Next he took his second challenge outside Chile after joining Patronato in the Argentine Primera División.

In 2022–23, Donoso played for O'Higgins in the Chilean top division, and switched to Universidad de Concepción in the Chilean second level for the second half of 2023.

In March 2025, Donoso signed with San Luis de Quillota. He switched to Deportes Temuco on 15 July of the same year.

In July 2026, Donoso joined Colchagua.

At international level, he was part of a Chile under-25 squad in a training session led by Claudio Borghi in May 2011, alongside his teammates in Unión Temuco, Leonardo Ruiz and Sebastián Domínguez.

=== Football 7 ===
He was selected for the Chile squad for the 2026 Kings World Cup Nations under Arturo Vidal as captain. They were the runners-up.

Donoso joined the City Soccer FC football 7 team with views to the 2026 TST Tournament, alongside his countrymen Nicolás Castillo, Mathías Vidangossy, Felipe Seymour and Juan Araya.

== Personal life ==
Donoso is a supporter of Deportes Iquique since his training club, Unión Victoria, are nicknamed Dragones Celestes (Sky Blue Dragons) and part of his family lived in Iquique.

== Honours ==
Unión Temuco

- Chilean Tercera A: 2009

Cobresal

- Chilean Primera División: 2015 Clausura

Individual

- Chilean Tercera División Best player: 2007
