= Matías Rojas (footballer, born 1996) =

Chilean footballer

Personal information
- Full name: Matías Ignacio Rojas Coloma
- Date of birth: 29 October 1996 (age 30)
- Place of birth: Maipú, Santiago, Chile
- Position: Defender

Youth career
- Cobresal

Senior career*
Years	Team	Apps	(Gls)
2015–2018	Cobresal	30	(0)
2018	Provincial Ovalle	–	(–)
2019	General Velásquez	7	(0)
Total		37	(0)
- * Club domestic league appearances and goals

Matías Ignacio Rojas Coloma (born 29 October 1996) is a Chilean former footballer who played as a defender.

== Career ==
Cobresal became Rojas' opening senior club in 2015. After going as an unused substitute on four occasions during 2015–16, Rojas was eventually given his professional debut by manager Rubén Vallejos in a fixture versus Unión La Calera on 24 October 2015. Cobresal were relegated to Primera B de Chile at the conclusion of 2016–17, Rojas had made twenty-five top-flight appearances prior. He stayed with the club for one and a half seasons, which preceded a departure in July 2018 to Provincial Ovalle of the Chilean Tercera División. A move to General Velásquez followed in 2019.

== Career statistics ==
As of 23 October 2020.

Club statistics
Club	Season	League			Cup		League Cup		Continental		Other		Total	
Club	Season	Division	Apps	Goals	Apps	Goals	Apps	Goals	Apps	Goals	Apps	Goals	Apps	Goals
Cobresal	2015–16	Primera División	11	0	0	0	—		0	0	0	0	11	0
Cobresal	2016–17	Primera División	14	0	0	0	—		—		0	0	14	0
Cobresal	2017	Primera B	5	0	0	0	—		—		0	0	5	0
Cobresal	2018	Primera B	0	0	0	0	—		—		0	0	0	0
Cobresal	Total		30	0	0	0	—		0	0	0	0	30	0
General Velásquez	2019	Segunda División	7	0	0	0	—		0	0	0	0	7	0
Career total			37	0	0	0	—		0	0	0	0	37	0
