= Diego Martínez (footballer, born 1988) =

Mexican footballer (born 1988)

Diego Emilio Martínez
Personal information
- Full name: Diego Emilio Martínez Soto
- Date of birth: 22 September 1988 (age 38)
- Place of birth: Tlalpan, Mexico City, Mexico
- Height: 1.72 m (5 ft 8 in)
- Position: Midfielder

Youth career
- 2007: Real Olmeca Sport

Senior career*
Years	Team	Apps	(Gls)
2007	Tulancingo	11	(3)
2008–2010	Tampico Madero	35	(11)
2010–2011	Tulancingo	23	(5)
2011–2012	Tecamachalco	38	(12)
2012–2013	Cuautitlán	28	(8)
2013–2018	Oaxaca	99	(12)
2017–2018	→ Tampico Madero (loan)	32	(6)
2019	UAEM	16	(1)
2020	Zacatepec	8	(1)
2020–2021	Atlético Morelia	44	(5)
2022	Atlante	9	(0)
- * Club domestic league appearances and goals

Diego Emilio Martínez Soto (born 22 September 1988) is a Mexican former professional footballer who played as a midfielder.

== Honours ==
Atlante

- Campeón de Campeones: 2022
