= Genaro Castillo =

Mexican footballer (born 1993)

Personal information
- Full name: Luis Genaro Castillo Martínez
- Date of birth: 25 May 1993 (age 33)
- Place of birth: Monterrey, Mexico
- Height: 1.79 m (5 ft 10 in)
- Position: Midfielder

Team information
- Current team: Empire Strykers
- Number: 34

Senior career*
Years	Team	Apps	(Gls)
2013–2016	Tigres UANL	5	(0)
2016–2017	Tampico Madero	16	(1)
2020–2021	Antigua GFC	7	(3)
2022–2024	Monterrey Flash (indoor)	42	(52)
2023–	Empire Strykers (indoor)	0	(0)
Total		28	(4)
- * Club domestic league appearances and goals

Luis Genaro Castillo Martínez (Note: In this Spanish name, the first or paternal surname is Castillo and the second or maternal family name is Martínez.) (born 25 May 1993) is a Mexican professional footballer who signed with the Empire Strykers of the Major Arena Soccer League in the summer of 2024. Luis Genaro Castillo began his career with Tigres UANL, moving through the ranks of the U17, U19 and U20 levels and eventually earning a spot on the first team. After transitioning to the professional indoor game with the Monterrey Flash in 2022, Castillo adapted rapidly, scoring the most attacking points of all players over the course of the 2023-24 MASL campaign and earning the title of MASL MVP.

== Club career ==
Having come up through the youth ranks of Tigres UANL, he made his professional debut in Liga MX in 2014, thanks to coach Ricardo Ferretti wanting to test his skills as a player.

He would later play for several clubs in the Mexican lower divisions, without managing to make his return to the most important competition in his country's professional football.

In March 2021, he joined Antigua GFC of the Guatemalan National Football League as a reinforcement. After helping his team avoid relegation, he left the club.

== Football 7 ==
In 2022, he changed sports and joined the Monterrey Flash, an indoor soccer team affiliated with the Major Arena Soccer League. In that competition, he stood out for his play, eventually being recognized as the MVP of the 2023–24 season.

In July 2024, the Empire Strykers of Ontario, California, attempted to sign him as a franchise player to replace Marco Fabián, but due to his work visa being denied, he was ultimately unable to join the team. Having become a free agent, he finished the year playing for Club de Cuervos de las Américas Kings League, a professional 7-a-side football tournament. The following year, he moved to Chamos FC in the same league, leading his team to the title of the first split of 2025.
