= Izak (gamer) =

Personal information
- Name: Piotr Skowyrski
- Nationality: Polish

Career information
- Games: Counter-Strike: Source; Counter-Strike: Global Offensive
- Playing career: Until 2013

Team history
- 2011: Team VEGA
- 2012–2013: iNET koxXx

Piotr Skowyrski, also known as Izak, is a Polish esports commentator, YouTube content creator, Twitch streamer, and former professional Counter-Strike player. He played for Team VEGA and iNET koxXx in Counter-Strike: Source and Counter-Strike: Global Offensive. He is the owner of a Polish esports organisation, Izako Boars and the Polish esports website, IzakTV.

== Career ==
Skowyrski has commentated important tournaments in Counter-Strike: Global Offensive, such as Copenhagen Games 2014 and GeForce Cup 2017. He also commentated on several CS:GO major tournaments: PGL Major: Kraków 2017 and Faceit Major: London 2018.

At the invitation of Telewizja Polska, Izak debuted as football commentator during a Poland – Netherlands friendly match, played before Euro 2016, where he worked with Maciej Iwański. Izak commentated every subsequent match for Poland in this championship. In 2018, he appeared as a TVP commentator during FIFA World Cup in Russia.

Along with Patryk “Rojo” Rojewski and Remigiusz “Rock” Maciaszek, Izak took part in the Polish dubbing for Battlefield 1.
