= Luis Pacheco (footballer, born 1992) =

Chilean footballer

Personal information
- Full name: Luis Felipe Pacheco Báez
- Date of birth: 20 March 1992 (age 34)
- Place of birth: Osorno, Chile
- Height: 1.68 m (5 ft 6 in)
- Position: Midfielder

Team information
- Current team: Platense FC

Youth career
- 2002–2010: Colo-Colo

Senior career*
Years	Team	Apps	(Gls)
2011–2012	Colo-Colo	0	(0)
2011	→ Iberia (loan)	–	(–)
2012	→ Naval (loan)	29	(2)
2013	Naval	10	(0)
2013–2015	Deportes Concepción	63	(3)
2015–2017	Magallanes	40	(1)
2017	Naval	16	(1)
2018	Iberia	22	(6)
2019	Deportes Recoleta	25	(2)
2020–2021	Fernández Vial	22	(2)
2021	Deportes Concepción	10	(1)
2024	MesoAmerica	1	(0)
2025	Real San Joaquín	11	(2)
2026–	Platense FC	0	(0)
- * Club domestic league appearances and goals as of 23 July 2026

Luis Felipe Pacheco Báez (born 20 March 1992) is a Chilean professional footballer who plays as a midfielder for Platense FC in the Liga Nacional de Fútbol de Honduras.

== Club career ==
Born in Osorno, Chile, Pacheco is a product of Chilean giant Colo-Colo. In 2011 and 2012, he was loaned out to Iberia and Naval.

The next years, Pacheco spent seasons with Deportes Concepción, Magallanes, Naval, Iberia, Deportes Recoleta, and Fernández Vial.

In 2024, Pacheco moved to the United States to play for SC MesoAmerica in the U.S. Open Cup. Back to Chile, he played for Real San Joaquín in 2025.

In July 2026, Pacheco and his countryman Piero Gárate moved to Honduras and joined Platense FC in the Liga Nacional de Fútbol.
