= Grégory Campi =

Monegasque footballer (born 1974)

Personal information
- Full name: Grégory Noel Campi
- Date of birth: 24 February 1976 (age 50)
- Place of birth: Monte Carlo, Monaco
- Positions: Midfielder; striker

Senior career*
Years	Team	Apps	(Gls)
- Ajaccio
1996–1997	Lille	0	(0)
1997–1998	Rouen		
1998–2000	Bari	2	(0)
2000–2001	Fidelis Andria	15	(0)
2001	Montreal Impact	4	(0)
2002–2003	Lille	2	(0)
2004–2005	Louvieroise	11	(0)
2006–2007	Sanremese	22	(0)
- * Club domestic league appearances and goals

Grégory Noel Campi (born 24 February 1974) is a Monégasque former professional footballer who played as a midfielder and striker.

== Playing career ==
Campi started his career with French side Ajaccio. In 1996, he signed for French Ligue 1 side Lille. One year later, he signed for French side Rouen, before signing for Italian Serie A side Bari in 1998, where he made two league appearances and scored zero goals. Two years later, he signed for Italian side Fidelis Andria, where he made fifteen league appearances and scored zero goals.

Subsequently, Campi signed for Montreal Impact in 2001, where he made four league appearances and scored zero goals. Three years later, he signed for Louvieroise, where he made eleven league appearances and scored zero goals. Following his stint there, he signed for Italian side Sanremese in 2006, where he made twenty-two league appearances and scored zero goals.

== Personal life ==
Campi was born on 24 February 1974 in Monte Carlo, Monaco. Nicknamed "Greg", he has been married and has two children. After retiring from playing professional football, he worked in the restaurant industry.
