= Alexis Silva =

Mexican footballer (born 1992)

Personal information
- Full name: Alexis Usbaldo Silva García
- Date of birth: 12 December 1992 (age 33)
- Place of birth: Celaya, Guanajuato, Mexico
- Height: 1.84 m (6 ft 0 in)
- Position: Defender

Senior career*
Years	Team	Apps	(Gls)
2011–2013	La Piedad	34	(7)
2013–2015	Veracruz	0	(0)
2013–2014	→ Orizaba (loan)	21	(0)
2014	→ Reynosa (loan)	14	(1)
2015	→ Orizaba (loan)	6	(0)
2015–2020	Irapuato	96	(7)
2018–2019	→ Celaya (loan)	21	(2)
2020	Jaguares de Jalisco	0	(0)
- * Club domestic league appearances and goals as of 18:46, 25 January 2020 (UTC)

Alexis Usbaldo Silva García (born December 12, 1992), known as Alexis Silva, is a Mexican professional association football (soccer) player who plays for Irapuato F.C.
