= Santiago Dittborn =

Chilean footballer (born 1992)

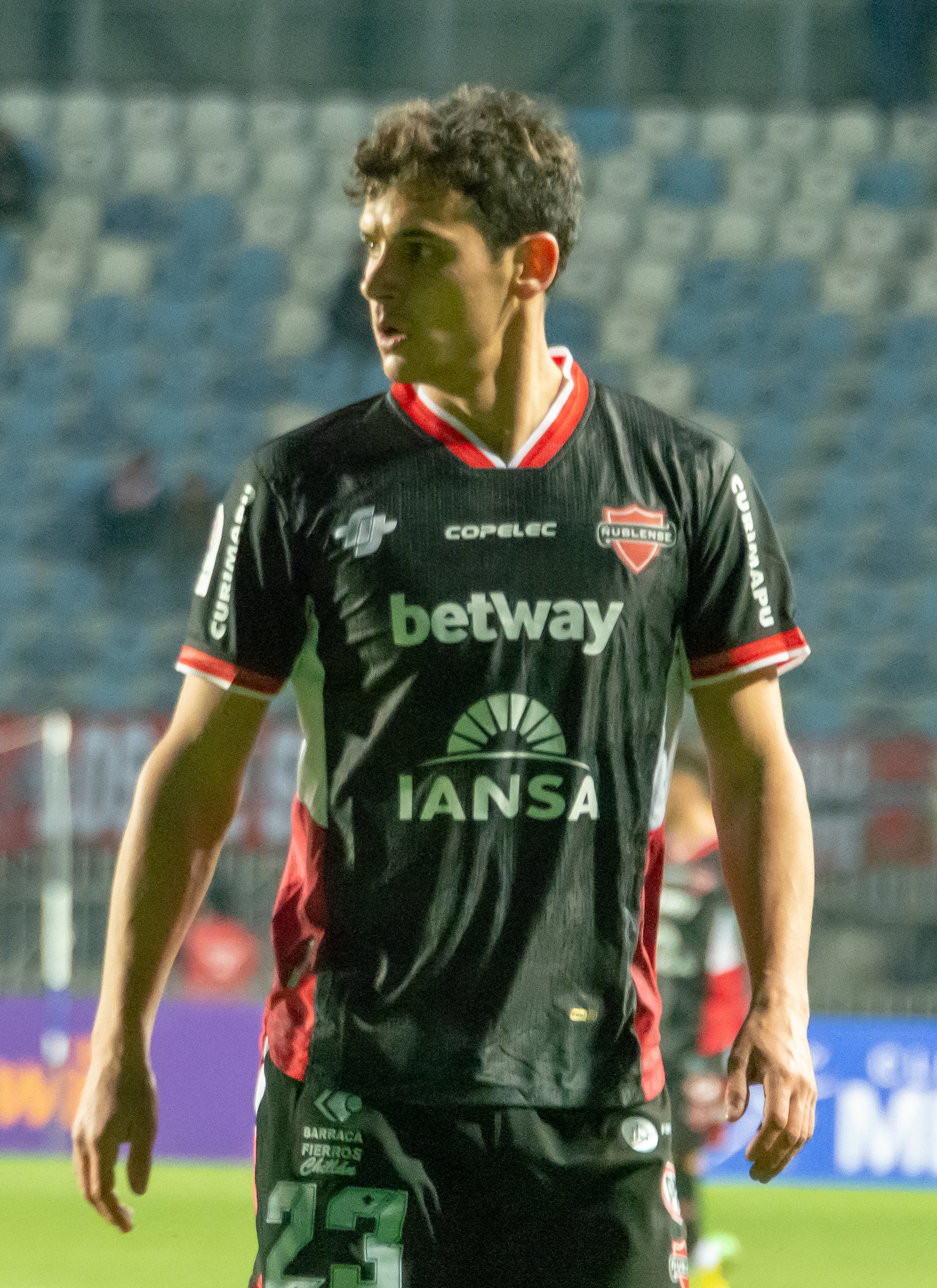
- Dittborn with Ñublense in 2023

Personal information
- Full name: Santiago Dittborn Martínez-Conde
- Date of birth: 30 October 1992 (age 34)
- Place of birth: Santiago, Chile
- Height: 1.74 m (5 ft 9 in)
- Position: Central midfielder

Youth career
- 2003–2010: Universidad Católica

Senior career*
Years	Team	Apps	(Gls)
2011–2015	Universidad Católica	18	(1)
2013	→ Cobreloa (loan)	10	(0)
2014–2015	→ San Marcos (loan)	2	(0)
2021–2022	Deportes La Serena	49	(6)
2023	Ñublense	8	(0)
2024	Audax Italiano	25	(2)

International career
2010–2012	Chile U20	10	(2)
- * Club domestic league appearances and goals as of 17 September 2024

Santiago Dittborn Martínez-Conde (born 30 October 1992) is a Chilean footballer who plays as a midfielder.

== Career ==
Dittborn played as a midfielder for Universidad Católica, Cobreloa and San Marcos de Arica. In 2015, he retired from football after ending his contract with Universidad Católica, but he returned to the activity by joining Deportes La Serena in the Chilean Primera División in 2021.

After being a free agent during the first half 2023, he signed with Ñublense for the second half of the 2023 season. The next season, he joined Audax Italiano.

== Football 7 ==
In May 2026, Dittborn joined the City Soccer FC football 7 team with views to the 2026 TST Tournament, alongside his countrymen Nicolás Castillo, Felipe Seymour, Mathías Vidangossy, Matías Donoso and Juan Araya.

== Personal life ==
He is the great-nephew of the renowned former Chilean sports leader Carlos Dittborn, since his grandfather was the cousin of him.

== Honours ==
Universidad Católica

- Copa Chile (1): 2011
