= Fernando Herrera (Chilean footballer) =

Chilean footballer

Personal information
- Full name: Fernando Manuel Herrera Bermúdez
- Date of birth: 8 January 1954 (age 72)
- Place of birth: Santiago, Chile
- Position: Goalkeeper

Youth career
- Universidad de Chile

Senior career*
Years	Team	Apps	(Gls)
1974–1977	Universidad de Chile		
1976	→ Deportes La Serena (loan)		
1978	Santiago Morning		
1979	New Jersey Americans		
1979	Ferroviarios		
1981	Santiago Wanderers		
- * Club domestic league appearances and goals

Fernando Manuel Herrera Bermúdez (born 8 January 1954) is a former Chilean footballer who played as a goalkeeper for clubs in Chile and the United States.

== Career ==
A product of football club Universidad de Chile, Herrera was a member of the first team since 1973 and played for them until 1977. In his last match, he received an own goal by Manuel Pellegrini in a 5–4 loss against Colo-Colo, the classic rival.

In his homeland, he also played for Deportes La Serena and Santiago Morning in the top division. In the second level, he played for Ferroviarios and Santiago Wanderers.

Abroad, he had a stint with New Jersey Americans in the 1979 American Soccer League.

== Personal life ==
Herrera is the father of the professional footballer Ignacio Herrera.

He developed a close friendship with the Argentine footballer Jorge Luis Ghiso, a player of Universidad de Chile from 1976 to 1978.
