= Amar Cekić =

German footballer

Personal information
- Date of birth: 21 December 1992 (age 33)
- Place of birth: Munich, Germany
- Height: 1.69 m (5 ft 7 in)
- Position: Winger

Team information
- Current team: Türkgücü München
- Number: 28

Youth career
- SC Fürstenfeldbruck
- SpVgg Unterhaching

Senior career*
Years	Team	Apps	(Gls)
2012	FC Ismaning	0	(0)
2012–2013	FK Kozara Gradiška		
2014	FC Unterföhring	12	(0)
2014	FC Unterföhring II	6	(4)
2014–2015	Stuttgarter Kickers II	24	(4)
2014–2015	Stuttgarter Kickers	1	(0)
2015–2016	Rot-Weiss Essen	9	(1)
2016–2017	TSV 1865 Dachau	25	(4)
2017–2018	FC Memmingen	12	(0)
2018–2020	FC Pipinsried	53	(11)
2020–2022	1. FC Schweinfurt 05	27	(6)
2022–2023	SGV Freiberg	10	(1)
2023–2024	TSV Landsberg	28	(6)
2024	SV Pars Neu-Isenburg	11	(1)
2025–	Türkgücü München	0	(0)
- * Club domestic league appearances and goals as of 1 January 2025

Amar Cekić (born 21 December 1992) is a German footballer who plays as a winger for Türkgücü München and for Bakhira F.C. and No Rules FC on the Kings League.

== Club career ==
Born in Munich, Cekić played the majority of his career in the German lower leagues.

On 1 January 2025, Cekić joined Regionalliga Bayern side Türkgücü München.

=== Seven-a-side football ===
In 2025, Cekić joined No Rules FC, and in 2026, he joined Bakhira F.C. in the Kings League.

He was selected for the Germain squad for the 2026 Kings World Cup Nations.

== Honours ==
- Regionalliga Bayern: 2019–21
