= Carlos Dittborn =

Chilean football administrator

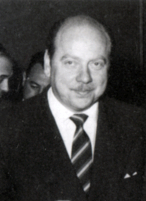
- Dittborn in 1957
- Born: Carlos Dittborn Pinto; April 16, 1921; Rio de Janeiro, Brazil
- Died: April 28, 1962 (aged 41); Santiago, Chile

Carlos Dittborn Pinto (1921–1962) was a Chilean football administrator. In his lifetime, he served as president of Universidad Católica and of CONMEBOL (the governing body of football in South America) and was the head of the organizing committee of the 1962 FIFA World Cup in his home country.

== Biography ==
=== Early life ===
Son of Eugenio Dittborn, Consul general of Chile in Brazil in the mid-1920s, Carlos Dittborn was born in Rio de Janeiro in 1921, but returned to Chile when he was 4 years old. He became involved with football from a young age. Between 1953 and 1954, he was president of Santiago multi-sports club Universidad Católica, most famous for its football branch. During Dittborn's two-years term, La Católica won the national league once, in 1954.

=== 1962 FIFA World Cup ===
In 1954, the Chilean Football Federation launched Chile's bid to host the FIFA World Cup in 1962. Dittborn travelled to many nations presenting the country as a good host for the tournament. The following year, Dittborn was elected president of CONMEBOL, succeeding fellow countryman Luis Hermosilla. In this post, he attended the 30th FIFA Congress, in Lisbon, Portugal, where he made a passionate speech to convince the delegates to vote for Chile. At the end, he famously pronounced the phrase "Porque nada tenemos, lo haremos todo" ("Because we have nothing, we will do everything"). This was a response to Raúl Colombo, representative of Argentina—one of Chile's opponents in the bidding—who ended his own speech with "Podemos hacer el Mundial mañana mismo. Lo tenemos todo" ("We can start the World Cup tomorrow. We have it all").

Chile won the bid 32 votes to 11 against Argentina (another contestant, West Germany, withdrew before the voting could take place), and Dittborn was selected head of the World Cup organizing committee. With full support from the federal government, work was started in Chile. However, on May 21, 1960, a massive earthquake struck the country, followed by an even bigger one the next day. The second one was the most powerful earthquake ever recorded on Earth, peaking at 9.5 on the Richter scale.

The earthquakes destroyed many cities that were supposed to host World Cup matches, such as Concepción, Talca and Valdivia. Other options, like Antofagasta and Viña del Mar, could not handle the expenses involved in being a host city. Dittborn even had a meeting with president Jorge Alessandri to return the money lent by the government. But help came from various football federations and even from FIFA - with whom Dittborn personally pleaded to keep the tournament in the country - and the organizing committee was able to put the event running again. In face of the situation, Dittborn's words at the FIFA Congress became somewhat of a slogan for Chile's recovery, as well as for the tournament.

=== Death ===
Dittborn would not live to see his biggest accomplishment come to life. On April 28, 1962 (one month and two days before the start of the World Cup), at age 41, he suffered a fatal heart attack. A different source, the 2010 book 1962: El mito del Mundial chileno, written by Chilean journalist Daniel Matamala, states that Dittborn's death was actually caused by severe pancreatitis. Whatever the reason, it is believed that the excessive amount of effort he put in making the World Cup ended up causing his untimely death.

In Dittborn's honor, each player of the Chile national team played the World Cup with a black stripe taped under his uniform's badge. One of the stadiums used in the competition, in Arica, was posthumously named after him. In addition, a friendly tournament between Argentina and Chile was established in 1962, and it was named Copa Carlos Dittborn Pinto.

== Personal life ==
He was the great-uncle of the Chilean professional footballer Santiago Dittborn, since he was the cousin of the grandfather of Santiago.
