= Felipe Seymour =

Chilean footballer (born 1987)

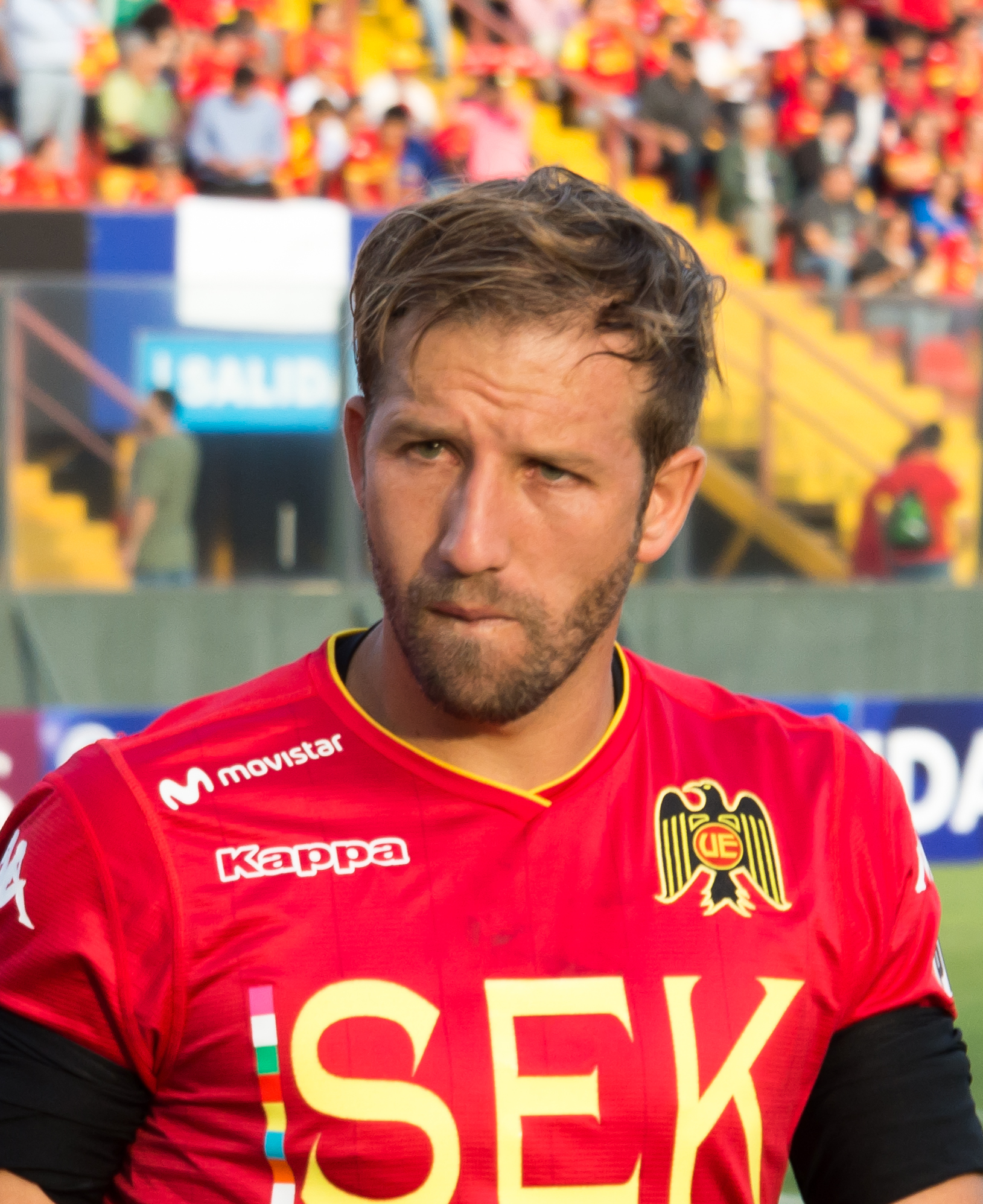
- Seymour with Unión Española in 2019

Personal information
- Full name: Felipe Ignacio Seymour Dobud
- Date of birth: 23 July 1987 (age 39)
- Place of birth: Pirque, Santiago, Chile
- Height: 1.74 m (5 ft 9 in)
- Position: Defensive midfielder

Youth career
- 2005–2007: Universidad de Chile

Senior career*
Years	Team	Apps	(Gls)
2006–2011	Universidad de Chile	96	(2)
2011–2014	Genoa	27	(0)
2012	→ Catania (loan)	13	(1)
2013	→ ChievoVerona (loan)	7	(0)
2013–2014	→ Spezia (loan)	29	(1)
2015	Cruzeiro	0	(0)
2015	→ Vasco da Gama (loan)	1	(0)
2016–2017	Unión Española	24	(0)
2017–2018	Universidad de Chile	28	(2)
2019	Unión Española	14	(0)
2020–2021	Unión La Calera	24	(0)
2021	O'Higgins	25	(0)
2022	Universidad de Chile	22	(0)
Total		310	(6)

International career^{‡}
2008	Chile U23	4	(0)
2010–2012	Chile	6	(0)
- * Club domestic league appearances and goals as of 12 April 2021 ‡ National team caps and goals as of 12 October 2012

Felipe Ignacio Seymour Dobud (born 23 July 1987) is a Chilean former professional footballer who played as a defensive midfielder.

== Club career ==
=== Early career ===
Born in Pirque, Santiago, Chile, Seymour began his football career on a Chilean reality television show called Adidas Selection Team. On the show, players from different professional clubs' youth squads were joined to form a team to play against different schools in the Chilean Metropolitan area. The team beat all the schools it played except the last, which was San Ignacio. San Ignacio beat "Team Adidas" with five goals scored by Felipe Seymour. After that Seymour was signed by the Universidad de Chile's youth squad.

In 2005, after Adidas Reality, Seymour began his career on the youth squad of Universidad de Chile at age 17.

=== Universidad de Chile ===
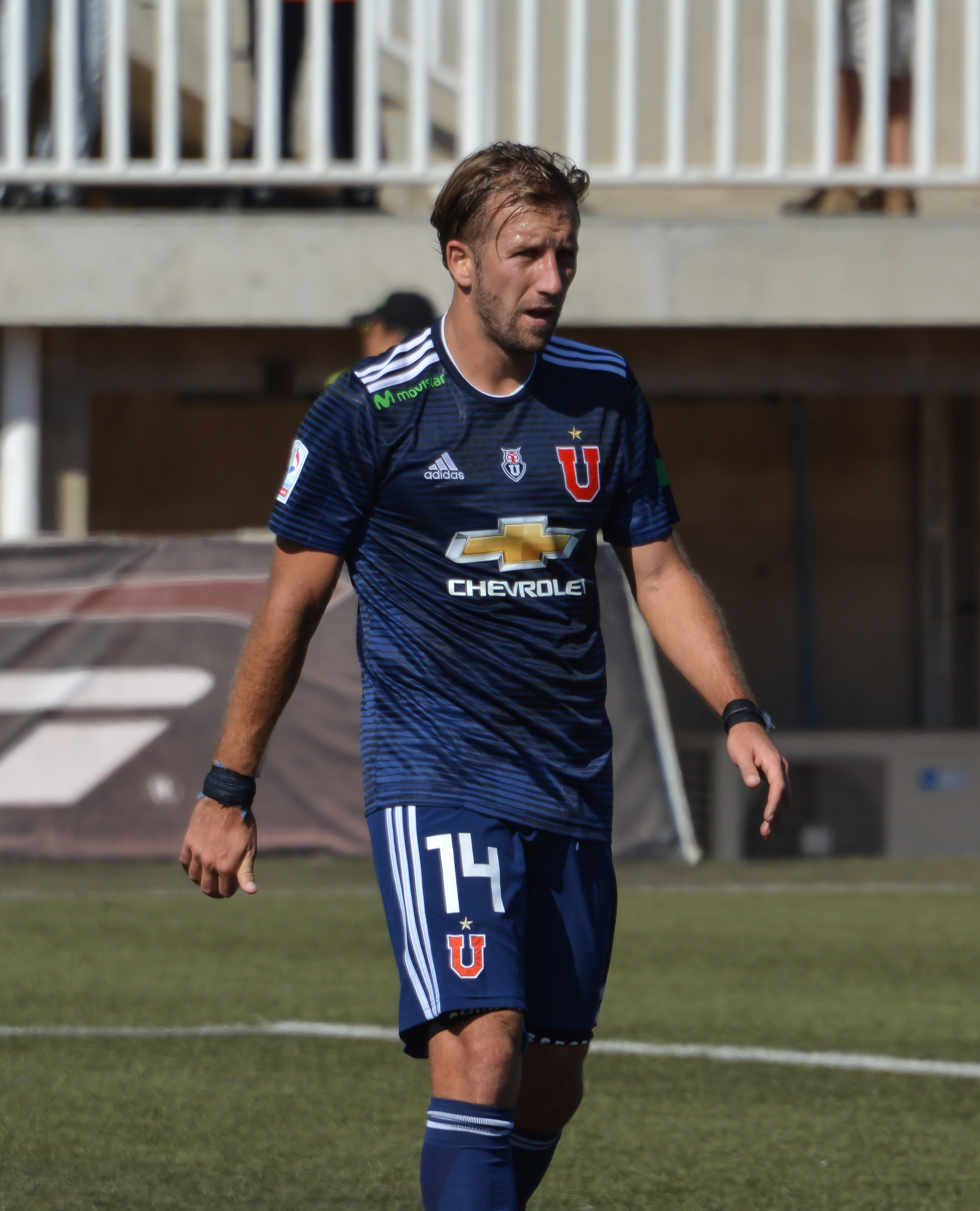
Seymour with Universidad de Chile.

His Universidad de Chile professional debut was in late 2006 against Palestino.

Under the management of Arturo Salah, Seymour was on the bench for most games, but on 21 October, he came off the bench in the Chilean football derby (called "Superclásico") against Colo-Colo. In 2008, his status as a substitute did not change. In Apertura 2008 he played in only five matches where he came off the bench. In Copa Chile 2008–09, he played in the starting lineup against the Santiago Wanderers in a 1–0 away loss in Estadio Regional Chiledeportes.

After the resignation of Arturo Salah and the arrival of Sergio Markarián, Seymour had more continuity in the starting lineup, and a good season for both him and the team resulted in a victory in Torneo Apertura 2009. Then with the arrival of Jose Basualdo, Seymour was frequently in the starting lineup. In Clásico Universitario he scored a goal against Universidad Católica in a 3–2 home loss.

In 2010 with the arrival of the Uruguayan coach Gerardo Pelusso, he became a key player for the club.

In Copa Libertadores 2010, he scored two long-distance goals. One took place against Flamengo in Estadio Monumental David Arellano in a 2–1 home victory in front of 30,000 spectators. The other was in a game against Alianza Lima in the last minute in the round of 16 for Copa Libertadores, when the team was losing on the global result. He was in matches on other occasions, against Huachipato on 9 February for the fourth week in Estadio Francisco Sánchez Rumoroso in a 3–0 home victory, and Cobresal on 5 September for the twenty-second week in Estadio El Cobre in a 2–1 away victory.

=== Genoa ===
In May 2011, the Italian diary Gazzetta dello sport officially confirmed the transfer of the Chilean midfielder to Serie A outfit, Genoa C.F.C. He has been compared with David Pizarro of Roma by the Italian press. Seymour made his Genoa debut on September 18, 2011, against S.S. Lazio, in a match won by Genoa by a score of 2–1. He played the whole 90 minutes. Seymour made 12 league appearances for Genoa in his first 5 months at the club, before being loaned to Calcio Catania for the remainder of the 2011-12 Serie A season.

On 31 January 2012 Seymour moved to Calcio Catania on a season long loan deal that expired on 30 June 2012, later went to Spezia and in 2014 signed a contract with the current Brazilian champion Cruzeiro.

=== Cruzeiro ===
After six months without a contract, the player received a proposal to return to South America, specifically play in Brazil. Signed with Cruzeiro Esporte Clube that comes from winning two consecutive national championships.

=== Return to Universidad de Chile ===
After his stint with O'Higgins, Seymour returned to Universidad de Chile by third time for the 2022 season. On 20 June 2023, he announced his retirement after seventeen years of career.

== Football 7 ==
Seymour joined the City Soccer FC football 7 team with views to the 2026 TST Tournament, alongside his countrymen Nicolás Castillo, Mathías Vidangossy, Matías Donoso and Juan Araya.

== International career ==
Felipe Seymour has been selected to play for Chile U23 in a tournament in Kuala Lumpur, Malaysia against teams from Oceania. It is rumored that in the game against Ecuador, Felipe Seymour was nominated but not selected, though Marcelo Bielsa considered him as an alternate.

== Personal life ==
He is of Croatian descent.

He is nicknamed Walala due to his resemblance to a character from the Chilean animated series Pulentos.

== Honours ==
=== Club ===
Universidad de Chile

- Primera División (2): 2009 Apertura, 2011 Apertura
