= Obed Martínez =

Mexican footballer (born 1996)

Personal information
- Full name: Obed Esau Martínez Villarreal
- Date of birth: 30 March 1996 (age 30)
- Place of birth: Monterrey, Mexico
- Height: 1.76 m (5 ft 9 in)
- Position: Midfielder

Youth career
- Monterrey

Senior career*
Years	Team	Apps	(Gls)
2016–2019	Monterrey	0	(0)
2016–2017	→ FC Juárez (loan)	17	(1)
2017–2019	→ Toledo (loan)	44	(1)
2020	Correcaminos UAT	4	(0)
2021	Atlético Veracruz	0	(0)
- * Club domestic league appearances and goals as of 21:18, 8 June 2020 (UTC)

Obed Saúl Martínez Villarreal (born 30 March 1996) is a professional Mexican footballer who currently plays for Correcaminos UAT as a midfielder. He made his professional debut with FC Juárez during a Copa MX victory over Veracruz on 19 July 2016. He played with Atlético Veracruz of the Liga de Balompié Mexicano during the league's inaugural season, leading them to a runners-up finish after losing to Chapulineros de Oaxaca in the finals.
