= Matteo Perrotti =

Italian footballer

Personal information
- Date of birth: 17 April 1999 (age 27)
- Place of birth: Milan, Italy
- Height: 1.85 m (6 ft 1 in)
- Position: Midfielder

Team information
- Current team: Villa Valle
- Number: 10

Youth career
- –2016: Enotria
- 2016–2018: Pro Piacenza

Senior career*
Years	Team	Apps	(Gls)
2017–2019	Pro Piacenza	4	(0)
2018	→ Fiorenzuola (loan)	2	(1)
2019	Castiadas	11	(0)
2019–2020	Clodiense	20	(4)
2020–2021	Adriese	5	(0)
2021	Caravaggio	20	(0)
2021–	Villa Valle	103	(15)
- * Club domestic league appearances and goals as of 4 April 2025

Matteo Perrotti (born 17 April 1999) is an Italian footballer who plays as a midfielder for Villa Valle and for Kings League team Stallions.

== Career ==
In November 2024, while he was playing for Villa Valle, he was announced as wild card for Kings League's team FC Zeta Milano.

In June 2025, his transfer to Mirko Cisco's Underdogs was announced. Between the Kings Cup and the second split of the Kings League, he once again proved himself to be one of the best players in the entire Kings League Italy. In January 2026, he was part of the Italian Kings League national team, scoring 9 goals in 4 matches.

== Career statistics ==
As of 13 October 2019.

Club	Season	League			Cup		Other		Total	
Club	Season	Division	Apps	Goals	Apps	Goals	Apps	Goals	Apps	Goals
Pro Piacenza	2016–17	Lega Pro	1	0	0	0	0	0	1	0
Pro Piacenza	2017–18	Serie C	0	0	0	0	0	0	0	0
Pro Piacenza	2018–19	Serie C	3	0	0	0	0	0	3	0
Pro Piacenza	Total		4	0	0	0	0	0	4	0
Fiorenzuola (loan)	2017–18	Serie D	13	1	0	0	0	0	13	1
Castiadas	2019–20	Serie D	9	0	0	0	0	0	9	0
Clodiense	2019–20	Serie D	4	2	0	0	0	0	4	2
Career total			30	3	0	0	0	0	30	3
