= Mathías Vidangossy =

Chilean footballer (born 1987)

Personal information
- Full name: Mathias Leonardo Vidangossy Rebolledo
- Date of birth: 25 May 1987 (age 39)
- Place of birth: Santiago, Chile
- Height: 1.72 m (5 ft 8 in)
- Positions: Midfielder; winger

Youth career
- 1997–2001: Universidad Católica
- 2003–2005: Unión Española

Senior career*
Years	Team	Apps	(Gls)
2005–2007	Unión Española	64	(5)
2007–2009	Villarreal	0	(0)
2007	→ Almería (loan)	0	(0)
2008	→ Audax Italiano (loan)	11	(0)
2008–2009	→ Everton (loan)	9	(0)
2009	→ Ñublense (loan)	5	(0)
2010	Ceará	0	(0)
2010	San Luis	15	(0)
2011	Deportes La Serena	34	(7)
2012–2014	Colo-Colo	48	(3)
2013	Colo-Colo B	3	(0)
2014	Unión Española	16	(0)
2015	Palestino	13	(1)
2015–2016	Chiapas	11	(1)
2016	→ UNAM (loan)	5	(1)
2016–2017	Palestino	11	(1)
2018	Deportes Melipilla	17	(0)
2019	Deportes Valdivia	17	(1)
2020	Colchagua	9	(1)
2021	Deportes Melipilla	24	(3)
2022	Unión La Calera	21	(0)
2023	San Luis	27	(2)
2024	Curicó Unido	21	(0)
Total		381	(26)

International career
2007	Chile U20	7	(1)
2006–2012	Chile	6	(0)
2026	Chile (football 7)	6	(5)
- * Club domestic league appearances and goals

Mathías Leonardo Vidangossy Rebolledo (born 25 May 1987) is a Chilean former professional footballer who played as an attacking midfielder or winger. He currently plays for the City Soccer FC football 7 team.

== Club career ==
Born in Santiago, Vidangossy began his career in the youth squads of Club Deportivo Universidad Católica, but finished his football grooming at Unión Española. He made his Chilean Primera División debuts in 2005, and became a constant feature in the starting lineups.

In June 2007, Vidangossy was signed to a five-year contract with Villarreal CF in Spain, joining compatriots Manuel Pellegrini (coach) and Matías Fernández. However, he would never play any official games for the club, as all of its foreign player spots were used up; he was quickly loaned out to fellow La Liga team UD Almería, but met the same fate.

Vidangossy was subsequently loaned to Chilean club Audax Italiano, which played in the 2008 edition of the Copa Libertadores. Afterwards, he stayed in the country and also on loan, now to Everton de Viña del Mar.

On 23 June 2009, Vidangossy was confirmed as a new Ñublense player, but he was released after only two months, momentarily retiring from football. He joined Ceará Sporting Club of the Brazilian Série A on 17 February 2010 but, shortly after, he returned to his country and signed for San Luis Quillota.

Vidangossy subsequently represented, in quick succession and always in the Chilean top flight, Deportes La Serena, Colo-Colo, Unión Española and Club Deportivo Palestino. On 27 August 2015, he was loaned by the latter side to Chiapas FC, who had the option to make the move permanent.

In February 2024, Vidangossy signed with Curicó Unido from San Luis de Quillota.

His retirement was confirmed in November 2025.

== Football 7 ==
In September 2024, Vidangossy moved to Mexico and joined Real Titán FC in the Kings League Américas. In October 2025, he switched to Aniquiladores FC. In February 2026, he joined Raniza FC alongside his countryman Matías Herrera.

He was selected for the Chile squad for the 2026 Kings World Cup Nations under Arturo Vidal as captain. They were the runners-up.

In April 2026, Vidangossy joined the City Soccer FC football 7 team for the 2026 TST Tournament alongside his countryman Nicolás Castillo.

== International career ==
In 2007, Vidangossy was selected to play for the Chilean under-20 team in the 2007 South American Youth Championship that took place in Paraguay. There, he scored twice against Bolivia.

The nation went on to qualify for the 2007 FIFA U-20 World Cup that took place in Canada: in the quarter-finals against Nigeria, Vidangossy netted the last goal in a 4–0 extra time as the team eventually finished third, their best-ever performance in the category.

== Honours ==
Unión Española

- Primera División de Chile (1): 2005 Apertura

Colo-Colo

- Primera División de Chile (1): 2014 Apertura

Chile U20

- FIFA U-20 World Cup: Third-place 2007
