= 2024 Kings World Cup =

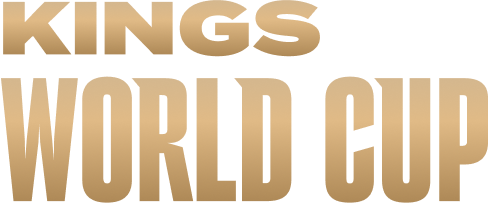

Tournament details
- Host country: Mexico
- Dates: May 26–June 8
- Teams: 32
- Venues: 2 (in 2 host cities)

Final positions
- Champions: (Spain) Porcinos FC (1st title)
- Runners-up: (Brazil) G3X FC
- Third place: (Spain) Saiyans FC
- Fourth place: (Spain) xBuyer Team

Tournament statistics
- Matches played: 55
- Goals scored: 407 (7.4 per match)
- Top scorer(s): (Brazil) Kelvin Oliveira (G3X FC) (13 goals)
- Best player(s): (Brazil) Kelvin Oliveira (G3X FC)
- Best goalkeeper: (Brazil) Josildo Barata (G3X FC)

The 2024 Kings World Cup was the inaugural edition of the Kings World Cup (later known as Kings World Cup Clubs), an international seven-a-side football tournament featuring teams from the Kings League and the Américas Kings League, plus twelve teams from future international versions of the Kings League, which made their debut as wildcards.

It took place in Mexico from May 26 to June 8. On 20 April, it was announced that the tournament finals would be held at Estadio BBVA in Monterrey.

== Background ==
On 7 November 2023, a new tournament was announced, tentatively named the Kings League World Cup. It was announced as featuring 20 teams from the Kings League, with 10 teams from Spain and 10 from the Americas, along with teams from other countries, totaling 32 teams. It was held in Mexico from 26 May to 8 June 2024.

Following the announcement, it was confirmed that former Sweden striker Zlatan Ibrahimović would preside over the competition.

== Slot Allocation ==
Direct entrants

- Kings League Spain : 8 teams (top 8 teams in Split 3)
- Kings League Americas : 8 teams (top 8 teams in Split 1)
- Wildcards : 12 teams
- Redemption Game winners : 4 teams

Redemption Game entrants

- Kings League Spain : 4 teams (teams ranked 9th to 12th in Split 3)
- Kings League Americas : 4 teams (teams ranked 9th to 12 in Split 1)

== Format ==
The Kings World Cup is being contested with some features of a Swiss-system tournament, and structured as follows:

Redemption Game

- In the Redemption round, the bottom 4 teams from Kings League Spain & Kings League Americas play against each other for the final 4 spots to the Kings World Cup

First stage

- In the first round, the 32 teams each play one match, with the pairings decided by an open draw, with no restrictions based on nation coincidence.
- All teams will move on to the second round, with the teams that won their first-round match going to a 'winner bracket' and the teams that lost going to a 'loser bracket'.
- The teams of the 'winner bracket' that win their second round match will immediately qualify for the knockout stage, while the losing teams will face the winning teams from the 'loser bracket' in a last-chance round. The winners of the last-chance round will join the 'winner bracket' second-round winners in the knockout stage.

Knockout stage

- The knockout phase will then consist of a round of 16, quarterfinals, semifinals and a final.
- The winners will receive a million-dollar cash prize.

== Teams ==
=== Kings League ===
President: (Spain) Gerard Piqué

Team	Chairperson(s)	Qualified via
1K FC	(Spain) Iker Casillas	2023/24 Split 3 Top 8
Aniquiladores FC	(Colombia) Juan Guarnizo	2023/24 Split 3 Top 8
Jijantes FC	(Spain) Gerard Romero	2023/24 Split 3 Top 8
Kunisports	(Argentina) Sergio Agüero	2023/24 Split 3 Top 8
Los Troncos FC	(Spain) Jaume Cremades (Perxitaa)	2023/24 Split 3 Top 8
Porcinos FC	(Spain) Ibai Llanos	2023/24 Split 3 Top 8
Saiyans FC	(Spain) David Cánovas (TheGrefg)	2023/24 Split 3 Top 8
Ultimate Móstoles	(Spain) Mario Alonso (DjMaRiiO)	2023/24 Split 3 Top 8
PIO FC	(Mexico) Samantha Rivera (Rivers)	Redemption Game
xBuyer Team	(Spain) Javier (xBuyer) and Eric Ruiz (MiniBuyer)	Redemption Game

=== Américas Kings League ===
President: (Mexico) Miguel Layún

Team	Chairperson(s)	Qualified via
(Dominican Republic) Galácticos del Caribe	(Dominican Republic) Vincent 'Will' Pérez and Angelo Valdés (Los Futbolitos) and Santiago Matías (Alofoke)	2024 Split 1 Top 8
(Argentina) Muchachos FC	(Argentina) Jero Freixas	2024 Split 1 Top 8
(Mexico) Olimpo United	(Mexico) Javier Hernández (Chicharito)	2024 Split 1 Top 8
(Mexico) Peluche Caligari	(Mexico) Álex (Escorpión Dorado) and Gabriel Montiel (Werevertumorro)	2024 Split 1 Top 8
(Peru) Persas FC	(Peru) Andy Merino (ElZeein)	2024 Split 1 Top 8
(Uruguay) Raniza FC	(Uruguay) Diego Balsa (BarcaGamer) and (Mexico) Alana Flores (AlanaLaRana)	2024 Split 1 Top 8
(Chile) Real Titán	(Chile) Germán Garmendia (HolaSoyGerman)	2024 Split 1 Top 8
(Colombia) West Santos FC	(Colombia) Luis Villa (Westcol) and (Puerto Rico) Austin Santos (Arcángel)	2024 Split 1 Top 8
(Mexico) Club de Cuervos	(Mexico) Mercedes Roa	Redemption Game
(United States) Los Aliens 1021	(United States) Edwin Castro (Castro)	Redemption Game

=== Wildcards ===
Team	Chairperson(s)	Qualification date
(Brazil) Furia FC	(Brazil) Allan Rodrigues (O Estagiário), Alessandro Rosa Vieira (Falcão) and Neymar da Silva	March 9, 2024
(Brazil) G3X FC	(Brazil) Alexandre Borba Chiqueta (Gaules)	March 9, 2024
(France) Foot2Rue	(France) Amine Mahmou (AmineMaTue)	March 18, 2024
(Germany) Youniors FC	(Germany) Younes Zarou and Mario Götze	March 18, 2024
(Belgium) Deptostra FC	(Belgium) Céline Dept and Eden Hazard	March 25, 2024
(England) FIVE FC	(England) Rio Ferdinand and Jeremy Lynch	March 25, 2024
(Japan) Murash FC	(Japan) Junichi Kato	April 1, 2024
(Saudi Arabia) SXB FC	(Saudi Arabia) Ahmed Alqahtani (SHoNgxBoNg)	April 1, 2024
(Italy) Stallions	(Italy) Gianmarco Tocco (Tumblurr) and Francesco Totti	April 8, 2024
(Turkey) Limon FC	(Turkey) Tuğkan Gönültaş (Elraenn)	April 15, 2024
(Ukraine) UA Steel	(Ukraine) Mykhailo Lebiha (Leb1ga) and Andriy Shevchenko	April 22, 2024
(Colombia) Medallo City	(Colombia) Juan Luis Londoño (Maluma)	May 6, 2024

== Squads ==
As usual in the Kings League, teams will field a regular roster of ten drafted players, plus guest 11th, 12th and 13th Players.

Players included in the initial/drafted 10 players for each team included FIVE FC's Manny Brown and Tom Clare. Brown is an English Sunday league footballer and YouTuber and the brother of Tobi "TBJZL" Brown of the Sidemen, while Clare is an English semi-pro footballer who was on Love Island's ninth and All-Stars series.

Team squads

(Spain) 1K FC

Manager: (Spain) Pol Coma

No.	Pos.	Nation	Player	Date of birth (age)
1	GK	(Spain) ESP	Alberto Arnalot	31 August 1990 (aged 33)
3	DF	(Spain) ESP	Marc Torrejón	18 February 1986 (aged 38)
7	GK	(Spain) ESP	Joan Canet	4 January 2003 (aged 21)
8	FW	(Spain) ESP	John de la Cruz	26 August 2003 (aged 20)
9	FW	(Spain) ESP	Albert Ruiz	17 March 1995 (aged 29)
11	FW	(Spain) ESP	David Barral	10 May 1983 (aged 41)
14	MF	(Spain) ESP	Iván Mateo	4 August 1981 (aged 42)
22	DF	(Spain) ESP	Marcos Guerrero	27 January 2002 (aged 22)
23	DF	(Spain) ESP	Marc Granero	20 August 2001 (aged 22)
25	MF	(Spain) ESP	Lluís Alsina	31 August 2001 (aged 22)
30	DF	(Spain) ESP	Albert Dalmau	16 March 1992 (aged 32)
33	DF	(Spain) ESP	Raúl Ledo	2 May 2001 (aged 23)
91	MF	(Spain) ESP	Marc Pluvins	18 June 1999 (aged 24)

(Spain) Aniquiladores FC

Manager: (Argentina) Sergio Verdirame

No.	Pos.	Nation	Player	Date of birth (age)
1	GK	(Spain) ESP	Pol Zapata	2 February 1999 (aged 25)
6	DF	(Algeria) ALG	Hichem Boumedol	15 September 1993 (aged 30)
7	MF	(Spain) ESP	Hugo Fraile	16 March 1987 (aged 37)
8	MF	(Spain) ESP	Javier Espinosa	19 September 1992 (aged 31)
9	FW	(Spain) ESP	David Alba	13 October 1986 (aged 37)
11	GK	(Spain) ESP	José Ruiz	8 June 1993 (aged 30)
14	MF	(Spain) ESP	Jordi Ros	12 February 1996 (aged 28)
19	FW	(Spain) ESP	Guillem Ruiz	2 March 1998 (aged 26)
22	DF	(Spain) ESP	Mario Reyes	26 May 1991 (aged 33)
23	MF	(Spain) ESP	Gerard Vergé	17 February 1998 (aged 26)
30	MF	(Spain) ESP	Joel Macarulla	18 November 2000 (aged 23)
31	MF	(Spain) ESP	Bernat Rovira	7 July 2000 (aged 23)
89	GK	(Spain) ESP	Xavi Morales	30 April 2002 (aged 22)

(Mexico) Club de Cuervos

Manager: (Mexico) Jacques Passy

No.	Pos.	Nation	Player	Date of birth (age)
5	MF	(Mexico) MEX	Eder López	7 February 1991 (aged 33)
7	MF	(Mexico) MEX	Manuel Viniegra	26 April 1988 (aged 36)
10	FW	(Argentina) ARG	Martín Bravo	19 September 1986 (aged 37)
11	FW	(Mexico) MEX	José Askenazi	6 June 2002 (aged 21)
12	GK	(Mexico) MEX	Jesús Carbajal	31 July 1996 (aged 27)
14	MF	(Mexico) MEX	Rafael Aja	16 July 1994 (aged 29)
17	DF	(Mexico) MEX	Diego Sanjuán	6 April 1993 (aged 31)
21	MF	(Mexico) MEX	Donovan Martínez	21 February 1998 (aged 26)
23	MF	(Mexico) MEX	Max Levy	18 January 2001 (aged 23)
26	MF	(Mexico) MEX	Erbín Trejo	3 June 1990 (aged 33)
99	MF	(Mexico) MEX	Santiago Lagarde	6 March 1996 (aged 28)

(Belgium) Deptostra FC

Manager: (Belgium) Rocky Peeters

No.	Pos.	Nation	Player	Date of birth (age)
3	DF	(Belgium) BEL	Viktor Boone	25 January 1998 (aged 26)
4	DF	(Belgium) BEL	Sahir Boumhand	10 December 2004 (aged 19)
7	FW	(Morocco) MAR	Nabil Jaadi	1 July 1996 (aged 27)
10	FW	(Belgium) BEL	Eden Hazard	7 January 1991 (aged 33)
16	MF	(Belgium) BEL	Seppe Brulmans	29 May 1994 (aged 29)
19	FW	(France) FRA	Yannis Salibur	24 January 1991 (aged 33)
27	DF	(Belgium) BEL	Jordy Gillekens	18 February 2000 (aged 24)
33	MF	(Belgium) BEL	Pieter Kempeneers	29 April 1994 (aged 30)
70	MF	(Belgium) BEL	Hamza Massoudi	24 January 2000 (aged 24)
77	MF	(Belgium) BEL	Dario Oger	28 May 2002 (aged 21)
79	MF	(Belgium) BEL	Ethan Hazard	9 August 2003 (aged 20)
88	GK	(Italy) ITA	Lillo Guarneri	8 May 2002 (aged 22)
99	GK	(France) FRA	Thomas Chesneau	28 April 1999 (aged 25)

(England) FIVE FC

Manager: (Wales) Dean Saunders

No.	Pos.	Nation	Player	Date of birth (age)
1	GK	(England) ENG	Max Pitman	2 August 2005 (aged 18)
3	FW	(England) ENG	Tom Clare	2 September 1999 (aged 24)
5	DF	(England) ENG	Anton Ferdinand	18 February 1985 (aged 39)
6	DF	(England) ENG	Frankie Moralee	6 September 2005 (aged 18)
7	MF	(England) ENG	Tyrelle Newton	28 October 2003 (aged 20)
8	FW	(England) ENG	Louis Matthews	10 September 2002 (aged 21)
10	FW	(England) ENG	Ben Black	1 March 1998 (aged 26)
11	MF	(Germany) GER	Radheya Ickrath	23 May 1995 (aged 29)
14	MF	(England) ENG	Dom Short	28 April 1998 (aged 26)
16	FW	(England) ENG	Jermaine Pennant	15 January 1983 (aged 41)
17	MF	(England) ENG	Manny Brown	10 June 1996 (aged 27)
98	DF	(England) ENG	Jack Downer	4 February 1998 (aged 26)
99	MF	(England) ENG	Mo Omar	15 October 1998 (aged 25)

(France) Foot2Rue

Manager: (France) Saïd Dorbani

No.	Pos.	Nation	Player	Date of birth (age)
1	GK	(France) FRA	Christian Nsapu	8 January 1996 (aged 28)
2	DF	(Algeria) ALG	Abdeljalil Medioub	28 August 1997 (aged 26)
4	DF	(France) FRA	Salah Bouazza	25 May 1999 (aged 25)
5	DF	(France) FRA	Melvin Bachelet	22 May 2003 (aged 21)
6	MF	(France) FRA	Clément Goguey	25 November 1997 (aged 26)
7	FW	(France) FRA	Jérémy Ménez	7 May 1987 (aged 37)
8	MF	(France) FRA	Théo Chendri	26 May 1997 (aged 27)
9	FW	(France) FRA	Amara Fofana	20 November 1998 (aged 25)
11	MF	(France) FRA	Lucas Valeri	20 February 2002 (aged 22)
12	FW	(France) FRA	Yanis Barka	18 April 1998 (aged 26)
99	GK	(Madagascar) MAD	Allan Rakotovazaha	3 October 1999 (aged 24)

(Brazil) Furia FC

Manager: (Brazil) Dudu Oliveira

No.	Pos.	Nation	Player	Date of birth (age)
3	DF	(Brazil) BRA	Wembley Luiz	15 August 1997 (aged 26)
7	MF	(Brazil) BRA	Jefferson Melo	27 September 1995 (aged 28)
8	MF	(Brazil) BRA	Gabriel Batista	3 November 1995 (aged 28)
9	FW	(Brazil) BRA	Higor Matos	28 August 1999 (aged 24)
10	FW	(Brazil) BRA	Marcelinho Urbano	3 August 1996 (aged 27)
11	FW	(Brazil) BRA	Leonardo Garcia	21 June 1996 (aged 27)
12	MF	(Brazil) BRA	Falcão	8 June 1977 (aged 46)
14	FW	(Brazil) BRA	Filype Pinheiro	11 December 1996 (aged 27)
22	GK	(Brazil) BRA	João Pedro Isidório	22 February 2001 (aged 23)
33	GK	(Brazil) BRA	Victão Dos Santos	16 January 1991 (aged 33)
77	MF	(Brazil) BRA	Gustavo Simon	19 February 1999 (aged 25)
94	MF	(Brazil) BRA	Matheus Nunes	31 May 1994 (aged 29)
99	MF	(Brazil) BRA	Vitinho Cucio	19 February 1991 (aged 33)

(Brazil) G3X FC

Manager: (Brazil) Víctor Taube

No.	Pos.	Nation	Player	Date of birth (age)
2	DF	(Brazil) BRA	Pepinho Souza	14 April 1996 (aged 28)
7	FW	(Brazil) BRA	Gabriel Menoci	23 June 1992 (aged 31)
8	MF	(Brazil) BRA	Wellington Rodrigues	21 July 1997 (aged 26)
9	FW	(Brazil) BRA	Kelvin Oliveira	15 August 1995 (aged 28)
10	MF	(Brazil) BRA	Andreas Vaz	18 May 1995 (aged 29)
13	DF	(Brazil) BRA	Maicon Silva	2 April 1998 (aged 26)
17	MF	(Brazil) BRA	Bruno Agnello	7 December 1985 (aged 38)
21	MF	(Brazil) BRA	Caio Garcia	6 July 2004 (aged 19)
22	GK	(Brazil) BRA	Gabriel Kawakami	8 August 2000 (aged 23)
77	FW	(Brazil) BRA	Victor Bueno	5 October 2000 (aged 23)
89	MF	(Brazil) BRA	Andre Lucato	7 February 1989 (aged 35)
98	GK	(Brazil) BRA	Josildo Barata	7 July 1998 (aged 25)
99	FW	(Brazil) BRA	Luiz Cardoso	17 October 1985 (aged 38)

(Dominican Republic) Galácticos del Caribe

Manager: (Mexico) Lucas Ayala

No.	Pos.	Nation	Player	Date of birth (age)
1	GK	(Mexico) MEX	Ricardo Ferriño	7 August 1991 (aged 32)
2	DF	(Mexico) MEX	César Bernal	14 February 1995 (aged 29)
7	MF	(Mexico) MEX	Jhonatan García	21 March 1999 (aged 25)
8	MF	(Mexico) MEX	Abner Monreal	6 April 2003 (aged 21)
9	MF	(Mexico) MEX	Brayan Hernández	14 September 2000 (aged 23)
10	FW	(Argentina) ARG	Pablo Gómez	16 July 1997 (aged 26)
11	FW	(Mexico) MEX	Daviz Junco	17 August 2000 (aged 23)
18	MF	(Mexico) MEX	Adrián Monroy	24 May 2003 (aged 21)
19	MF	(Argentina) ARG	Gabriel Peñalba	23 September 1984 (aged 39)
21	FW	(Mexico) MEX	Erick Cerda	19 December 1998 (aged 25)
22	MF	(Mexico) MEX	Pablo Sámano	1 May 2005 (aged 19)
80	MF	(Mexico) MEX	Marlon Martínez	2 January 2003 (aged 21)
88	GK	(Mexico) MEX	Julio Torres	2 May 2001 (aged 23)

(Spain) Jijantes FC

Manager: (Spain) Pau Moral

No.	Pos.	Nation	Player	Date of birth (age)
1	GK	(Spain) ESP	Mario León	25 May 1983 (aged 41)
7	MF	(Spain) ESP	Nil Ayats	2 April 1998 (aged 26)
8	MF	(Spain) ESP	Marc Pelaz	19 September 2003 (aged 20)
9	FW	(Spain) ESP	Carlos Contreras	28 November 1992 (aged 31)
10	FW	(Spain) ESP	Adrián Espinar	7 September 2000 (aged 23)
11	FW	(Spain) ESP	Diego Díaz	10 March 1995 (aged 29)
13	GK	(Spain) ESP	José Segovia	13 April 1991 (aged 33)
14	FW	(Spain) ESP	David Sánchez	9 April 1992 (aged 32)
17	FW	(Spain) ESP	Uri Pons	6 June 2002 (aged 21)
18	MF	(Spain) ESP	Fernando Quesada	5 January 1994 (aged 30)
20	MF	(Spain) ESP	Sergi Cabré	24 July 1998 (aged 25)
21	DF	(Spain) ESP	Sergio Juste	19 January 1992 (aged 32)
22	DF	(Spain) ESP	Adrián Frutos	25 July 1991 (aged 32)

(Spain) Kunisports

Manager: (Argentina) Martín Posse

No.	Pos.	Nation	Player	Date of birth (age)
1	GK	(Spain) ESP	Víctor Cócera	18 January 1993 (aged 31)
2	DF	(Spain) ESP	Carlos Val	19 February 2000 (aged 24)
4	DF	(Spain) ESP	Álex Campuzano	27 April 2000 (aged 24)
5	MF	(Spain) ESP	Noel López	10 May 2000 (aged 24)
9	FW	(Spain) ESP	Iván Pérez	11 March 2002 (aged 22)
11	FW	(Spain) ESP	Carlos Torrentbó	6 February 1991 (aged 33)
13	DF	(Spain) ESP	Adrià Escribano	10 January 1993 (aged 31)
15	MF	(Argentina) ARG	Nicolás Gaitán	23 February 1988 (aged 36)
16	MF	(Spain) ESP	Jordi Gómez	24 May 1985 (aged 39)
20	MF	(Spain) ESP	Iñaki Villalba	15 January 2000 (aged 24)
21	DF	(Argentina) ARG	Nicolás Pareja	19 January 1984 (aged 40)
22	FW	(Spain) ESP	Jordi Martínez	9 January 1995 (aged 29)
25	GK	(Spain) ESP	Sergi Aguilar	8 July 1995 (aged 28)

(Turkey) Limon FC

Manager: (Turkey) Burak Kaymak

No.	Pos.	Nation	Player	Date of birth (age)
1	GK	(Turkey) TUR	Alp Arda	7 June 1995 (aged 28)
3	DF	(Turkey) TUR	Yiğit Yenihayat	8 November 2000 (aged 23)
4	DF	(Turkey) TUR	Mehmet Yeşil	31 May 1998 (aged 25)
7	MF	(Turkey) TUR	Berk Kıratlı	23 May 1995 (aged 29)
9	FW	(Turkey) TUR	Berker Güllü	22 November 2000 (aged 23)
10	MF	(Turkey) TUR	Serhat Kot	12 August 1997 (aged 26)
11	MF	(Turkey) TUR	Yiğit Özbey	17 December 2003 (aged 20)
29	MF	(Turkey) TUR	Berke Onuk	3 August 2002 (aged 21)
31	DF	(Germany) GER	Memos Sözer	18 October 1994 (aged 29)
54	GK	(Turkey) TUR	Osman Naz	29 September 2005 (aged 18)
61	FW	(Netherlands) NED	Berkay Sezer	1 July 2000 (aged 23)
70	FW	(Turkey) TUR	Mete Kaan Demir	13 May 1998 (aged 26)
94	MF	(Turkey) TUR	Osman Ural	25 August 1994 (aged 29)

(United States) Los Aliens 1021

Manager: (Mexico) Efraín Velarde

No.	Pos.	Nation	Player	Date of birth (age)
5	DF	(Mexico) MEX	Anferny Rebollar	3 December 1995 (aged 28)
6	MF	(Mexico) MEX	Juan Marín	3 August 1999 (aged 24)
7	MF	(Mexico) MEX	David Cabrera	7 September 1989 (aged 34)
9	FW	(Mexico) MEX	Damián Scarinci	10 August 1992 (aged 31)
10	MF	(Mexico) MEX	Kevin Quiñones	30 April 1992 (aged 32)
13	GK	(Mexico) MEX	Óscar Medina	15 October 1993 (aged 30)
14	FW	(Mexico) MEX	José Nieto	31 October 1991 (aged 32)
17	GK	(Mexico) MEX	Tirso Trueba	11 June 1996 (aged 27)
18	MF	(Mexico) MEX	César Villaluz	18 July 1988 (aged 35)
21	FW	(Mexico) MEX	Julio Espinoza	3 December 1999 (aged 24)
42	MF	(Mexico) MEX	Daniel Ríos	2 May 1996 (aged 28)
93	FW	(Mexico) MEX	Miguel Rebollo	18 February 1993 (aged 31)
94	FW	(Mexico) MEX	César Vallejo	17 May 1994 (aged 30)

(Spain) Los Troncos FC

Manager: (Spain) Èric Bartra

No.	Pos.	Nation	Player	Date of birth (age)
1	GK	(Spain) ESP	Josep Corderas	9 February 1993 (aged 31)
3	DF	(Spain) ESP	Ian González	1 June 2003 (aged 20)
4	DF	(Spain) ESP	Álex Cubedo	29 May 1999 (aged 24)
7	FW	(Spain) ESP	Mark Sorroche	15 June 2004 (aged 19)
8	MF	(Spain) ESP	Sergio Sánchez	2 December 1993 (aged 30)
9	FW	(Spain) ESP	Edgar Álvaro	14 January 2000 (aged 24)
10	MF	(Spain) ESP	Joan Verdú	5 May 1983 (aged 41)
11	FW	(Spain) ESP	Vicenç Oromí	15 March 2004 (aged 20)
13	GK	(Spain) ESP	Manu Martín	4 April 1995 (aged 29)
17	MF	(Spain) ESP	Aitor Vives	6 August 1998 (aged 25)
19	MF	(Spain) ESP	Carles Ferres	7 May 1995 (aged 29)
21	DF	(Spain) ESP	Carles Planas	4 March 1991 (aged 33)
23	MF	(Spain) ESP	Max Marcet	30 July 1996 (aged 27)

(Colombia) Medallo City

Manager: (England) Jason Murray

No.	Pos.	Nation	Player	Date of birth (age)
1	GK	(Spain) ESP	Sergi Monsalve	12 April 1993 (aged 31)
8	MF	(England) ENG	Leigh Rose	16 December 1992 (aged 31)
9	MF	(Spain) ESP	Bernat Burguera	6 August 2000 (aged 23)
10	MF	(Spain) ESP	Kevin Sosa	13 November 1995 (aged 28)
11	MF	(Bermuda) BER	Chikosi Basden	1 February 1995 (aged 29)
14	MF	(Spain) ESP	Marcos Ortiz	25 November 2002 (aged 21)
18	FW	(France) FRA	Joseph Diomande	2 January 1995 (aged 29)
19	FW	(Spain) ESP	Karam Ben Mhani	1 October 1988 (aged 35)
20	MF	(England) ENG	Luka Marušić	25 May 2000 (aged 24)
21	MF	(Morocco) MAR	Ilias Dahmi	13 January 2000 (aged 24)
24	DF	(England) ENG	Jonathan Sanchez	Unknown
28	MF	(Belarus) BLR	Mihailov Eugene	2 August 2001 (aged 22)
99	GK	(England) ENG	Ibi Ugradar	27 November 1999 (aged 24)

(Argentina) Muchachos FC

Manager: (Argentina) Ricardo La Volpe

No.	Pos.	Nation	Player	Date of birth (age)
1	GK	(Mexico) MEX	Jonathan Orozco	12 May 1986 (aged 38)
2	DF	(Mexico) MEX	Israel Jiménez	3 August 1989 (aged 34)
7	MF	(Mexico) MEX	Edwin Cárdenas	21 March 2005 (aged 19)
8	FW	(Spain) ESP	Josep Alonso	8 June 1996 (aged 27)
9	FW	(Mexico) MEX	Abner Rebollar	21 June 1993 (aged 30)
11	FW	(Mexico) MEX	Juan Hernández	5 January 1986 (aged 38)
14	GK	(Argentina) ARG	Franco Colagrossi	27 July 1990 (aged 33)
17	MF	(Mexico) MEX	Erik Vera	24 March 1992 (aged 32)
18	MF	(Mexico) MEX	Julio García	20 February 1995 (aged 29)
23	MF	(Mexico) MEX	Gerardo Lugo	31 December 1984 (aged 39)
30	FW	(Argentina) ARG	Emanuel Villa	24 February 1982 (aged 42)
32	DF	(Mexico) MEX	Gustavo Lua	24 February 1990 (aged 34)
77	MF	(Mexico) MEX	Diego Martínez	22 September 1988 (aged 35)

(Japan) Murash FC

Manager: (Japan) Tatsuro Inui

No.	Pos.	Nation	Player	Date of birth (age)
1	GK	(Japan) JPN	Keisuke Fukaya	20 June 1998 (aged 25)
4	DF	(Japan) JPN	Daisuke Nasu	10 October 1981 (aged 42)
5	MF	(Japan) JPN	Kensuke Enjo	23 August 1993 (aged 30)
7	MF	(Japan) JPN	Hiroki Kiyokawa	7 April 1996 (aged 28)
8	MF	(Japan) JPN	Riyohei Oda	3 March 2000 (aged 24)
9	FW	(Japan) JPN	Kenta Kobayashi	10 July 1994 (aged 29)
10	DF	(Japan) JPN	Koujiro Kanetake	1 June 1991 (aged 32)
11	MF	(Japan) JPN	Naoki Waragaya	13 November 1990 (aged 33)
13	DF	(Japan) JPN	Kosei Nunoo	29 September 2001 (aged 22)
14	DF	(Japan) JPN	Itsuki Yamada	5 October 1990 (aged 33)
16	FW	(Japan) JPN	Tatsuya Hirai	22 May 1997 (aged 27)
17	MF	(Japan) JPN	Shohei Moriyasu	17 August 1991 (aged 32)
29	GK	(Japan) JPN	Yusei Narita	29 December 1999 (aged 24)

(Mexico) Olimpo United

Manager: (Mexico) Alejandro Castro

No.	Pos.	Nation	Player	Date of birth (age)
1	GK	(Mexico) MEX	Juan Jiménez	28 February 1998 (aged 26)
3	FW	(Mexico) MEX	Diego Vivian	10 December 1997 (aged 26)
7	FW	(Mexico) MEX	Francisco García	19 July 1996 (aged 27)
8	MF	(Mexico) MEX	Jesús Pérez	21 January 1997 (aged 27)
9	FW	(Mexico) MEX	Marco Bueno	31 March 1994 (aged 30)
10	DF	(Mexico) MEX	Mario Osuna	20 August 1988 (aged 35)
13	DF	(Mexico) MEX	Carlos Valencia	4 April 2000 (aged 24)
16	GK	(Mexico) MEX	Baruc Mateos	23 September 1999 (aged 24)
17	MF	(Mexico) MEX	Rodolfo Salinas	29 August 1987 (aged 36)
18	MF	(Mexico) MEX	José Rodríguez	20 November 1997 (aged 26)
19	FW	(Mexico) MEX	Jacob Morales	22 March 1999 (aged 25)
77	MF	(Mexico) MEX	Rafael González	19 January 1998 (aged 26)

(Mexico) Peluche Caligari

Manager: (Mexico) Ángel Reyna

No.	Pos.	Nation	Player	Date of birth (age)
1	GK	(Mexico) MEX	James Hernández	28 November 2005 (aged 18)
4	DF	(Mexico) MEX	Diego Flores	27 August 2005 (aged 18)
7	MF	(Mexico) MEX	Gustavo Guillén	24 September 1993 (aged 30)
8	DF	(Mexico) MEX	Alejandro Corona	13 February 2001 (aged 23)
11	FW	(Mexico) MEX	Alejandro Vázquez	1 July 1994 (aged 29)
12	DF	(Mexico) MEX	Luis Lozoya	10 April 1993 (aged 31)
13	FW	(Mexico) MEX	Dustinn Salazar	22 December 2000 (aged 23)
17	MF	(Mexico) MEX	Emiliano López	18 June 2004 (aged 19)
22	MF	(Mexico) MEX	Francisco García	8 January 2001 (aged 23)
23	DF	(Mexico) MEX	José Joaquín Martínez	22 February 1987 (aged 37)
28	FW	(Mexico) MEX	Ismael Valadéz	14 September 1985 (aged 38)
80	FW	(Mexico) MEX	Gabriel Morales	9 November 2000 (aged 23)
94	MF	(Mexico) MEX	Mauricio Campos	10 August 2000 (aged 23)

(Peru) Persas FC

Manager: (Mexico) Víctor Chaires

No.	Pos.	Nation	Player	Date of birth (age)
1	GK	(Argentina) ARG	Ariel Pérez	10 June 1987 (aged 36)
2	DF	(Mexico) MEX	Rafael Cid	3 June 1995 (aged 28)
4	DF	(Argentina) ARG	Nicolás Jalil	8 October 1992 (aged 31)
5	MF	(Mexico) MEX	José Islas	21 September 2000 (aged 23)
7	DF	(Mexico) MEX	Alejandro Díaz	29 July 1999 (aged 24)
11	MF	(Colombia) COL	Brihan Gutiérrez	2 December 1997 (aged 26)
12	GK	(Mexico) MEX	Antonio Monterde	16 December 1997 (aged 26)
19	FW	(Mexico) MEX	Fernando Olmedo	26 February 2003 (aged 21)
22	MF	(Mexico) MEX	Juan Peña	6 May 1998 (aged 26)
23	FW	(Mexico) MEX	Juan López	5 October 1994 (aged 29)
24	FW	(Mexico) MEX	Luis González	9 February 1997 (aged 27)
25	MF	(Mexico) MEX	Irving Melgar	26 August 2001 (aged 22)
31	MF	(Mexico) MEX	Ian Granados	31 August 2002 (aged 21)

(Spain) PIO FC

Manager: (Spain) Arnau Jariod

No.	Pos.	Nation	Player	Date of birth (age)
1	GK	(Spain) ESP	Jorge Ibáñez	13 March 2003 (aged 21)
2	DF	(Spain) ESP	Iker López	9 August 2003 (aged 20)
4	DF	(Spain) ESP	Víctor Mongil	21 July 1992 (aged 31)
5	DF	(Spain) ESP	Jandro Megía	2 July 1998 (aged 25)
6	MF	(Spain) ESP	Jan Coca	3 March 2004 (aged 20)
7	MF	(Spain) ESP	Iván López	14 March 1996 (aged 28)
9	FW	(Spain) ESP	Jordi Cano	1 April 1995 (aged 29)
11	DF	(Argentina) ARG	Rubens Sambueza	1 January 1984 (aged 40)
13	GK	(Spain) ESP	Enric Avellaneda	24 December 1994 (aged 29)
14	FW	(Spain) ESP	Carlos Omabegho	21 January 1995 (aged 29)
20	FW	(Spain) ESP	José Manuel Fontcuberta	4 January 2000 (aged 24)
22	MF	(Spain) ESP	Aarón Ropero	31 January 2001 (aged 23)
77	FW	(Spain) ESP	Lasha Macharashvili	7 October 2001 (aged 22)

(Spain) Porcinos FC

Manager: (Spain) Nacho Castro

No.	Pos.	Nation	Player	Date of birth (age)
1	GK	(Spain) ESP	Marc Briones	27 June 1998 (aged 25)
3	DF	(Morocco) MAR	Nadir Louah	29 May 2003 (aged 20)
5	DF	(Spain) ESP	David Cárdenas	2 February 1985 (aged 39)
6	MF	(Spain) ESP	Óscar Coll	19 June 2000 (aged 23)
7	FW	(Spain) ESP	Nico Santos	7 February 2000 (aged 24)
10	FW	(Spain) ESP	Jacobo Fernández de Liencres	11 June 1996 (aged 27)
11	FW	(Spain) ESP	Dorkis Pérez	10 April 2002 (aged 22)
16	DF	(Spain) ESP	Àlex Gutiérrez	11 March 1994 (aged 30)
19	MF	(Spain) ESP	Pablo Hernández	11 April 1985 (aged 39)
21	DF	(Spain) ESP	David Soriano	5 January 2000 (aged 24)
22	MF	(Spain) ESP	Adrián Lledó	3 March 1997 (aged 27)
25	GK	(Spain) ESP	Eloy Amoedo	10 March 2003 (aged 21)

(Uruguay) Raniza FC

Manager: (Mexico) Severo Meza

No.	Pos.	Nation	Player	Date of birth (age)
1	GK	(Mexico) MEX	Bernardo Lugo	6 December 2002 (aged 21)
7	FW	(Mexico) MEX	José Rochín	28 April 1999 (aged 25)
8	FW	(Mexico) MEX	Sergio Vázquez	25 April 2001 (aged 23)
9	FW	(Mexico) MEX	Baruc Ochoa	13 July 2001 (aged 22)
14	MF	(Mexico) MEX	Ricardo Villavicencio	18 May 2001 (aged 23)
17	MF	(Mexico) MEX	Axel Martínez	12 February 1997 (aged 27)
20	MF	(Mexico) MEX	Obed Martínez	30 March 1996 (aged 28)
22	MF	(Colombia) COL	Yair Arias	21 January 2000 (aged 24)
23	GK	(Mexico) MEX	Hugo Murga	19 October 1999 (aged 24)
29	MF	(Mexico) MEX	Geovanni Sánchez	30 May 2002 (aged 21)
30	DF	(Ecuador) ECU	Walter Ayoví	11 August 1979 (aged 44)
49	MF	(Mexico) MEX	César Romo	17 December 1995 (aged 28)

(Chile) Real Titán

Manager: (Spain) Pol Font

No.	Pos.	Nation	Player	Date of birth (age)
1	GK	(Mexico) MEX	Paul Cruz	29 January 1998 (aged 26)
3	DF	(Mexico) MEX	Carlos Calvo	2 December 1992 (aged 31)
5	MF	(Mexico) MEX	Martín Rodríguez	18 May 1998 (aged 26)
6	DF	(Uruguay) URU	Álvaro Pereira	28 November 1985 (aged 38)
7	FW	(Mexico) MEX	Santiago Martínez	2 September 2003 (aged 20)
8	MF	(Mexico) MEX	Javier Meraz	17 September 1999 (aged 24)
9	MF	(Mexico) MEX	Erick Guzmán	15 July 1994 (aged 29)
10	MF	(Spain) ESP	Fran Hernández	8 April 1994 (aged 30)
11	MF	(Mexico) MEX	Edson Trejo	31 December 2000 (aged 23)
13	MF	(Mexico) MEX	Christopher Pedraza	23 November 1998 (aged 25)
17	FW	(Mexico) MEX	Andrés Guzmán	26 February 1999 (aged 25)
19	GK	(Mexico) MEX	Omar Láscari	11 April 1996 (aged 28)
28	FW	(Mexico) MEX	Alberto García	26 September 1993 (aged 30)
40	MF	(Mexico) MEX	Cristian Rojas	7 June 2002 (aged 21)

(Spain) Saiyans FC

Manager: (Spain) Daniel Romo

No.	Pos.	Nation	Player	Date of birth (age)
1	GK	(Spain) ESP	Iván Fajardo	22 May 1997 (aged 27)
5	DF	(Argentina) ARG	Martín Mantovani	7 July 1984 (aged 39)
7	MF	(Spain) ESP	Pablo Fernández	30 May 1996 (aged 27)
8	MF	(Spain) ESP	Marc Galvany	19 April 2004 (aged 20)
10	MF	(Spain) ESP	Dani Liñares	16 May 1998 (aged 26)
11	MF	(Spain) ESP	Jero Martín	5 November 1995 (aged 28)
20	MF	(Spain) ESP	David López	10 September 1982 (aged 41)
21	MF	(Spain) ESP	Alfons Serra	10 December 1990 (aged 33)
22	MF	(Spain) ESP	Lucca Ribeiro	12 June 2002 (aged 21)
24	MF	(Argentina) ARG	Augusto Fernández	10 April 1986 (aged 38)
25	GK	(Spain) ESP	Dani Pérez	7 October 1998 (aged 25)
77	MF	(Spain) ESP	Sergi Gestí	14 February 1994 (aged 30)
99	FW	(Spain) ESP	Gio Ferinu	9 August 1998 (aged 25)

(Italy) Stallions

Manager: (Italy) Luca Diddi

No.	Pos.	Nation	Player	Date of birth (age)
1	GK	(Italy) ITA	Emiliano Viviano	1 December 1985 (aged 38)
2	DF	(Italy) ITA	Leon Baldi	21 February 2003 (aged 21)
3	DF	(Romania) ROU	Vlad Marin	15 May 1995 (aged 29)
4	MF	(Belgium) BEL	Radja Nainggolan	4 May 1988 (aged 36)
7	DF	(Italy) ITA	Mattia Spera	13 January 1995 (aged 29)
8	MF	(Italy) ITA	Giovanni Valtulini	13 May 2002 (aged 22)
9	FW	(Italy) ITA	Michele Trombetta	3 August 1994 (aged 29)
10	FW	(Italy) ITA	Francesco Totti	27 September 1976 (aged 47)
11	FW	(Italy) ITA	Issam Zaki	14 May 1999 (aged 25)
14	DF	(Italy) ITA	Andrea Tarasco	22 September 2000 (aged 23)
19	DF	(Italy) ITA	Stefano Sberna	5 August 2003 (aged 20)
88	GK	(Italy) ITA	Justyn D'Ippolito	14 August 1998 (aged 25)
92	FW	(Italy) ITA	Andrea Benedetti	16 January 2003 (aged 21)

(Saudi Arabia) SXB FC

Manager: (Saudi Arabia) Abdullah Al-Shehri

No.	Pos.	Nation	Player	Date of birth (age)
1	GK	(Brazil) BRA	Bruno Araújo	20 October 1986 (aged 37)
2	GK	(Saudi Arabia) KSA	Mohammed Ahmed	21 June 1990 (aged 33)
7	MF	(Brazil) BRA	Gabriel Ferro	28 May 1993 (aged 30)
8	MF	(Brazil) BRA	Anderson Migulha	3 May 1992 (aged 32)
11	MF	(Brazil) BRA	Williams Nascimento	26 April 1985 (aged 39)
12	MF	(Saudi Arabia) KSA	Fahad Rudayni	28 May 1989 (aged 34)
13	MF	(Sudan) SDN	Eihab Mohamed	13 June 1994 (aged 29)
14	MF	(Saudi Arabia) KSA	Farhan Al-Asmari	20 May 1996 (aged 28)
21	DF	(Brazil) BRA	Wanderson Da Silva	17 July 1991 (aged 32)
77	MF	(Brazil) BRA	Élton Gomes	3 July 1986 (aged 37)
88	MF	(Brazil) BRA	Thiago Grippi	9 July 1988 (aged 35)
89	MF	(Brazil) BRA	Fabiano d'Oliveira	3 July 1989 (aged 34)

(Ukraine) UA Steel

Manager: (Ukraine) Valeriy Fedorchuk

No.	Pos.	Nation	Player	Date of birth (age)
5	MF	(Ukraine) UKR	Oleh Shelayev	11 May 1976 (aged 48)
8	FW	(Ukraine) UKR	Marlos	7 June 1988 (aged 35)
9	FW	(Ukraine) UKR	Júnior Moraes	4 April 1987 (aged 37)
10	FW	(Ukraine) UKR	Andriy Voronin	21 July 1979 (aged 44)
11	FW	(Ukraine) UKR	Yevhen Konoplyanka	29 September 1989 (aged 34)
12	GK	(Ukraine) UKR	Andriy Pyatov	28 June 1984 (aged 39)
23	DF	(Ukraine) UKR	Dmytro Chyhrynskyi	7 November 1986 (aged 37)
33	DF	(Croatia) CRO	Darijo Srna	1 May 1982 (aged 42)
44	DF	(Ukraine) UKR	Artem Fedetskyi	26 April 1985 (aged 39)
55	MF	(Ukraine) UKR	Valeriy Fedorchuk	5 October 1988 (aged 35)
80	MF	(Ukraine) UKR	Edmar	16 June 1980 (aged 43)
99	DF	(Ukraine) UKR	Mykola Morozyuk	17 January 1988 (aged 36)

(Spain) Ultimate Móstoles

Manager: (Spain) Álex Martínez

No.	Pos.	Nation	Player	Date of birth (age)
1	GK	(Spain) ESP	Víctor Vidal	14 November 1999 (aged 24)
3	DF	(Spain) ESP	Joel Bañuls	18 September 2001 (aged 22)
4	DF	(Spain) ESP	Aleix Massegú	23 May 1995 (aged 29)
6	MF	(Spain) ESP	Aleix Lage	26 August 1991 (aged 32)
7	FW	(Spain) ESP	Aleix Martí	19 October 2004 (aged 19)
8	FW	(Spain) ESP	Coro	5 January 1983 (aged 41)
9	FW	(Spain) ESP	Kilian Honorato	22 April 1999 (aged 25)
10	MF	(Spain) ESP	Cristian Ubón	23 April 2001 (aged 23)
20	MF	(Spain) ESP	Feliu Torrus	11 December 1993 (aged 30)
21	DF	(Spain) ESP	Diego de la Mata	3 March 1993 (aged 31)
22	DF	(Spain) ESP	Dani Martí	12 October 1982 (aged 41)
24	DF	(Spain) ESP	Alberto de la Bella	2 December 1985 (aged 38)
66	DF	(Spain) ESP	Eloy Pizarro	18 September 2002 (aged 21)

(Colombia) West Santos FC

Manager: (Mexico) Gabriel España

No.	Pos.	Nation	Player	Date of birth (age)
1	GK	(Mexico) MEX	Moisés Dabbah	25 July 1997 (aged 26)
4	FW	(Colombia) COL	Jhon Monsalve	9 April 2001 (aged 23)
7	MF	(Colombia) COL	William Rojas	2 June 1989 (aged 34)
9	FW	(Mexico) MEX	Juan Celada	26 July 1994 (aged 29)
10	FW	(Mexico) MEX	Alfredo Fierro	29 May 2004 (aged 19)
12	MF	(Bolivia) BOL	Roberto Medrano	1 July 2005 (aged 18)
15	MF	(Colombia) COL	Samuel Rojas	30 September 2004 (aged 19)
17	MF	(Colombia) COL	Fredy Rodríguez	27 February 2000 (aged 24)
21	DF	(Mexico) MEX	Juan Martínez	23 January 2000 (aged 24)
22	GK	(Mexico) MEX	Silverio Rocchi	16 July 1988 (aged 35)
28	MF	(Mexico) MEX	Santiago Pérez	30 May 2003 (aged 20)
29	MF	(Mexico) MEX	Francisco Estrada	20 January 1993 (aged 31)
30	MF	(Mexico) MEX	José Miramontes	25 January 2000 (aged 24)

(Spain) xBuyer Team

Manager: (Spain) Víctor González

No.	Pos.	Nation	Player	Date of birth (age)
1	GK	(Spain) ESP	Álex Romero	2 July 1998 (aged 25)
2	DF	(Spain) ESP	Pau Llastarry	8 June 2001 (aged 22)
4	DF	(Spain) ESP	Víctor Torres	17 January 2003 (aged 21)
5	MF	(Spain) ESP	Daniel Pérez	11 March 1997 (aged 27)
9	FW	(Spain) ESP	Iker Alcarazo	16 July 2002 (aged 21)
10	MF	(Spain) ESP	Pablo Beguer	30 January 1995 (aged 29)
11	MF	(Spain) ESP	Roger Carbó	4 June 1998 (aged 25)
13	GK	(Spain) ESP	Capi	10 July 2004 (aged 19)
14	FW	(Spain) ESP	Roger de la Villa	25 April 1996 (aged 28)
17	FW	(Spain) ESP	Fernando Velillas	21 July 1986 (aged 37)
22	FW	(Spain) ESP	Juanma González	4 October 1992 (aged 31)
24	DF	(Spain) ESP	Pere Martínez	24 July 1991 (aged 32)
80	MF	(Morocco) MAR	Fuad El Amrani	30 November 2001 (aged 22)

(Germany) Youniors FC

Manager: (Montenegro) Damir Agovic

No.	Pos.	Nation	Player	Date of birth (age)
1	GK	(Germany) GER	Tim Böff	7 July 2003 (aged 20)
5	DF	(Germany) GER	Daniel Brosinski	17 July 1988 (aged 35)
6	MF	(Germany) GER	Ahmed Azaouagh	20 June 1996 (aged 27)
8	DF	(Germany) GER	Max Dombrowka	24 March 1992 (aged 32)
9	MF	(Germany) GER	Ali Ibrahimaj	18 August 1998 (aged 25)
10	MF	(Tunisia) TUN	Änis Ben-Hatira	18 July 1988 (aged 35)
21	FW	(Iran) IRN	Ashkan Dejagah	5 July 1986 (aged 37)
22	MF	(Germany) GER	Amar Cekić	20 December 1992 (aged 31)
23	MF	(Kosovo) KOS	Besar Halimi	12 December 1994 (aged 29)
27	DF	(Morocco) MAR	Mohamed Youssef	23 June 1999 (aged 24)
61	FW	(Turkey) TUR	Suad Ak	6 July 2002 (aged 21)
93	MF	(Belgium) BEL	Julien Vercauteren	12 January 1993 (aged 31)

== Broadcasting rights ==
Aside from the usual livestreams on Twitch and YouTube, both from the official Kings League channels and the teams' chairpersons, the Kings World Cup will also be airing on the following channels and platforms:

Country or region	Broadcaster	Matches shown
Armenia, Azerbaijan, Estonia, Georgia, Latvia, Lithuania, Kazakhstan, Kyrgyzstan, Moldova, Tajikistan, Turkmenistan, Ukraine and Uzbekistan	Setanta Sports	All
Belgium and Portugal	DAZN	All
Brazil	Desimpedidos; Camisa21	All
Catalonia	3Cat	All
France	M6+	All
Ghana and Nigeria	SportyTV	All
Hungary	RTL+	Round of 16 onwards
Israel	OneSport	All
Italy	Sportitalia	All
Mexico	Canal 6	All
Netherlands	RTL Nederland; Videoland	All
Norway	VG	All
Philippines	TAP TV	All
Russia	OKKO	All
Sweden	Sportbladet	All
Turkey	Acun Medya; Exxen	All
West and Central Africa	Moov TV	All

== Tournament staff ==
Person	Role
(Sweden) Zlatan Ibrahimović	President of the Kings World Cup ("King of Kings")
(Mexico) Manuel Barrera Baquero	Spanish-language commentators
(Chile) Felipe Sebastián Muñoz	Spanish-language commentators
(Spain) Jaume Naveira	Spanish-language commentators
(Venezuela) Gonzalo Rodríguez	Spanish-language commentators
(Mexico) Yael Romero	Spanish-language commentators
(Costa Rica) Pamela Muñoz	Spanish-language interviewers
(Spain) Laura Vizcaíno	Spanish-language interviewers
(France) Alix Dulac (Nanix)	French-language interviewer
(Brazil) Diogo Fonteles	Portuguese-language interviewer
(Italy) Agnese Nespoli	Italian-language interviewer

== Redemption Game ==
The Redemption Game was a play-in contested on 25 May, the day before the official start of the tournament, onsite in Mexico City. The four Kings League teams and the four Américas Kings League teams that did not qualify directly (9th through 12th place in both leagues' most recent splits) played each other for the last remaining four spots in the tournament, with a Spanish team facing an Américas Kings League team in each instance.

Teams in the Redemption Game

League	Team	Chairperson(s)
Spain	El Barrio	(Spain) Adri Contreras
Spain	PIO FC	(Mexico) Samantha Rivera (Rivers)
Spain	Rayo de Barcelona	(Andorra) Martí Miràs (Spursito)
Spain	xBuyer Team	(Spain) Javier (xBuyer) and Eric Ruiz (MiniBuyer)
Americas	(Colombia) Atlético Parceros	(Colombia) James Rodríguez and Pelicanger
Americas	(Mexico) Club de Cuervos	(Mexico) Mercedes Roa
Americas	(United States) Los Aliens 1021	(United States) Edwin Castro (Castro)
Americas	(Venezuela) Los Chamos FC	(Venezuela) Donato Muñoz (TheDonato) and Flavio Broianigo (YOLO)

Matches

25 May 2024 Redemption Game 1	Club de Cuervos (Mexico)	2–1	(Spain) El Barrio	Mexico City
13:00	Azkenazi 21'; Roa 22' (pp)	Report	Contreras 6' (pp)	Stadium: Quarry Studios

25 May 2024 Redemption Game 2	Los Chamos FC (Venezuela)	1–6	(Spain) PIO FC	Mexico City
15:00	Sámano (yellow card) 17'; Medina 20+1'; Franco (yellow card) 39'	Report	Omabegho 3'; Sambueza 5' (pen.) (yellow card) 15'; Mongil (yellow card) 17'; Iv. López 21' (pen.) (yellow card) 38'; Cano 28'; Ropero 30', 31'	Stadium: Quarry Studios

25 May 2024 Redemption Game 3	Los Aliens 1021 (United States)	5–2	(Spain) Rayo de Barcelona	Mexico City
14:00	Rebollo 20+1', 34' (x2), 38'; Castro 24' (pp)	Report	Maldonado 19'; Spursito 31' (pp)	Stadium: Quarry Studios

25 May 2024 Redemption Game 4	Atlético Parceros (Colombia)	0–7	(Spain) xBuyer Team	Mexico City
12:00	Caro (yellow card) 23'	Report	Beguer 3'; Martínez (yellow card) 10'; Llastarry (yellow card) 12'; Carbó 20', 20+1', 20+2'; El Amrani 29'; MiniBuyer 34' (pp); González 36'	Stadium: Quarry Studios

== First Stage ==
=== First round ===
The first round was contested from 26 to 28 May 2024.

27 May 2024 (Note: These matches were due to be played on 26 May, but were postponed due to technical issues in the arena and severe weather conditions outside.) First round A	Olimpo United (Mexico)	1–6	(Brazil) Furia FC	Mexico City
18:00	Osuna 1' (pen.)	Report	Garcia 2', 26'; Pinheiro 5', 19'; Matos 22', 30'	Stadium: Quarry Studios; MVP: Filype Pinheiro

26 May 2024 First round B	Stallions (Italy)	3–2	(Colombia) Medallo City	Mexico City
15:00	Tumblurr 21' (pp); Trombetta 34' (x2)	Report	Rose 1'; Burguera 21' (pen.); Sanchez (yellow card) 40+2'	Stadium: Quarry Studios; MVP: Francesco Totti

26 May 2024 First round C	UA Steel (Ukraine)	0–4	(Brazil) G3X FC	Mexico City
14:00		Report	Oliveira 1'; Menoci 20+1'; Garcia 35', 36'	Stadium: Quarry Studios; MVP: Kelvin Oliveira

27 May 2024 First round D	Murash FC (Japan)	4–10	(Uruguay) Raniza FC	Mexico City
19:00	Kato 16'; Oda 20+3'; Kiyokawa 36' (x2)	Report	Martínez 2', 4'; Rochín 13', 40+1' (2x); Nasu 17' (o.g.); Ayoví 19'; Ochoa 20+2'; Romo 31'; Arias 32'	Stadium: Quarry Studios; MVP: Obed Martínez

28 May 2024 First round E	Los Troncos FC (Spain)	5–5 (1–0 p)	(Chile) Real Titán	Mexico City
17:00	Álvaro 4'; Planas 7', 30'; González (yellow card) 8'; Verdú 20+2'; Sorroche 21'	Report	Garmendia 14' (pp); Hernández 19', 20+2', 24' (pen.), 33'	Stadium: Quarry Studios; MVP: Fran Hernández
	Penalties
	Verdú (penalty scored); Sorroche (penalty missed); Álvaro (penalty missed); Oromí (penalty missed)		(penalty missed) E. Guzmán; (penalty missed) Pedraza; (penalty missed) Calvo; (penalty missed) Hernández; (penalty missed) García

28 May 2024 First round F	Los Aliens 1021 (United States)	4–5	(Spain) Ultimate Móstoles	Mexico City
15:00	Rebollo 16' (pen.); Castro 24' (pp); Cabrera 29', 38' (pen.); Medina (yellow card) 36'	Report	D. Martí (yellow card) 15'; A. Martí 18', 19'; Coro 23'; Lage 27'; Ubón (yellow card) 36' 40+4'	Stadium: Quarry Studios; MVP: Víctor Vidal

27 May 2024 First round G	Porcinos FC (Spain)	7–4	(Argentina) Muchachos FC	Mexico City
16:00	Gutiérrez 1', 35'; Louah 12'; Lledó 20', 20+1'; Soriano 20+2'; Hernández 27'	Report	Martínez 1', 5'; Freixas 21' (pp); Cárdenas 31'	Stadium: Quarry Studios; MVP: Àlex Gutiérrez

26 May 2024 First round H	Youniors FC (Germany)	0–2	(Spain) Saiyans FC	Mexico City
11:00	Dombrowka (yellow card) 40+2'	Report	P. Fernández 20+1'; López (yellow card) 31'; A. Fernández (yellow card) 34'; TheGrefg 38' (pp)	Stadium: Quarry Studios; MVP: Dani Pérez

26 May 2024 First round I	Peluche Caligari (Mexico)	5–4	(Belgium) Deptostra FC	Mexico City
12:00	Campos 12'; Valadéz 16'; Guillén (yellow card) 19' (goal) 36'; Martínez 20+1'; G. Montiel 38' (pp)	Report	Jaadi 20'; Oger 20+2'; Gillekens 21' (yellow card) 27'; Boone (yellow card) 26'; Dept 38' (pp)	Stadium: Quarry Studios; MVP: Gustavo Guillén

27 May 2024 First round J	Foot2Rue (France)	5–5 (2–1 p)	(Spain) PIO FC	Mexico City
14:00	Rakotovazaha (yellow card) 2'; Goguey 14'; Fofana 20+1', 24' (pen.); Barka 20+2'; Medioub 20+4' (pen.)	Report	Omabegho 1', 3'; Iv. López 6'; Sambueza 10' (pen.); Ropero 16'	Stadium: Quarry Studios; MVP: Carlos Omabegho
	Penalties
	Bachelet (penalty missed); Chendri (penalty missed); Ménez (penalty scored); Fofana (penalty missed); Barka (penalty scored)		(penalty missed) Macharashvili; (penalty missed) Cano; (penalty missed) Ropero; (penalty scored) Iv. López; (penalty missed) Omabegho

27 May 2024 First round K	1K FC (Spain)	2–3	(Mexico) Club de Cuervos	Mexico City
17:00	Barral (yellow card) 11'; Granero 20+1', 29'; Arnalot (yellow card) 40+2'	Report	Saadia (yellow card) 2'; Azkenazi (yellow card) 20+1' (goal) 39'; Rosales 40+1' (x2)	Stadium: Quarry Studios; MVP: Marc Granero

26 May 2024 First round L	West Santos FC (Colombia)	2–2 (2–3 p)	(Spain) Aniquiladores FC	Mexico City
16:00	Dabbah 3'; Monsalve 15'; Estrada (yellow card) 18'; Celada (yellow card) 38'	Report	J. Ruiz 20+2'; Rovira 38' (pen.)	Stadium: Quarry Studios; MVP: Moisés Dabbah
	Penalties
	Celada (penalty missed); Dabbah (penalty missed); Pérez (penalty scored); W. Rojas (penalty missed); Estrada (penalty scored); Martínez (penalty missed); Miramontes (penalty missed); Fierro (penalty missed)		(penalty scored) Espinosa; (penalty scored) Rovira; (penalty missed) Vergé; (penalty missed) Ros; (penalty missed) Alba; (penalty missed) J. Ruiz; (penalty missed) Reyes; (penalty scored) Fraile

28 May 2024 First round M	Jijantes FC (Spain)	1–3	(Turkey) Limon FC	Mexico City
14:00	Espinar 29' (pen.)	Report	Demir 1'; Arda 3'; Sözer 10'	Stadium: Quarry Studios; MVP: José Segovia

27 May 2024 First round N	FIVE FC (England)	5–6	(Spain) Kunisports	Mexico City
15:00	Newton 4', 20+1'; Clare 7', 30' (pen.); Lynch 34' (pen.)	Report	Gómez 1', 20+2', 24', 36'; Gaitán 20', 28'	Stadium: Quarry Studios; MVP: Jordi Gómez

26 May 2024 First round O	SXB FC (Saudi Arabia)	3–2	(Peru) Persas FC	Mexico City
13:00	Araújo 3'; Silva 20'; Oliveira 33'	Report	González 10', 19'	Stadium: Quarry Studios; MVP: Williams Oliveira

28 May 2024 First round P	xBuyer Team (Spain)	7–6	(Dominican Republic) Galácticos del Caribe	Mexico City
16:00	Beguer 4', 9'; Alcarazo 16'; El Amrani 28' (x2); MiniBuyer 35' (pp) de la Villa (yellow card) 38'; Velillas 39'	Report	Hernández 3', 6', 20+2'; Gómez 20', 37' (pen.); Will 35' (pp)	Stadium: Quarry Studios; MVP: Pablo Beguer

=== Winners' Bracket ===
The Winners' Bracket teams who win their second-round match will advance to the knockout stage; the losing teams will go to the last-chance round.

29 May 2024 Second round 1	Furia FC (Brazil)	2–1	(Italy) Stallions	Mexico City
17:00	Melo 25', 40+2'	Report	Totti 19'	Stadium: Quarry Studios; MVP: Francesco Totti

31 May 2024 Second round 2	G3X FC (Brazil)	5–2	(Uruguay) Raniza FC	Mexico City
18:00	Oliveira 1', 25'; Silva 6', 20' (yellow card) 38'; Rodrigues 12'	Report	Rochín 5' (yellow card) 40+3'; Osvaldo Martínez 34' (pen.)	Stadium: Quarry Studios; MVP: Kelvin Oliveira

31 May 2024 Second round 3	Los Troncos FC (Spain)	6–3	(Spain) Ultimate Móstoles	Mexico City
16:00	Martín 2'; Verdú 19'; Marcet 39' (x2); Oromí 40+2' (x2)	Report	Vidal 2'; Pizarro 20+1'; Ubón 35' (pen.)	Stadium: Quarry Studios; MVP: Manu Martín

30 May 2024 Second round 4	Porcinos FC (Spain)	6–5	(Spain) Saiyans FC	Mexico City
14:00	Lledó 4', 20+1'; Llanos 6' (pp); Hernández 12', 20', 38' (pen.)	Report	Martín 1', 19'; Gestí (yellow card) 14'; Fernández 20+1'; TheGrefg 24' (pp); Liñares 24'	Stadium: Quarry Studios; MVP: Adrián Lledó

29 May 2024 Second round 5	Peluche Caligari (Mexico)	5–5 (3–2 p)	(France) Foot2Rue	Mexico City
15:00	Guillén 20', 20', 20+1'; Á. Montiel 29' (pp); Martínez 31'	Report	Amine 18' (pp); Fofana 34'; Bachelet 36'; Barka 40+2' (x2)	Stadium: Quarry Studios; MVP: Gustavo Guillén
	Penalties
	Guillén (penalty missed); Campos (penalty scored); Martínez (penalty missed); Salazar (penalty scored); Valadez (penalty missed); Corona (penalty missed); Lozoya (penalty scored)		(penalty missed) Goguey; (penalty missed) Bouazza; (penalty scored) Valeri; (penalty missed) Barka; (penalty scored) Ménez; (penalty missed) Bachelet; (penalty missed) Chendri

30 May 2024 Second round 6	Club de Cuervos (Mexico)	1–1 (1–2 p)	(Spain) Aniquiladores FC	Mexico City
18:00	Martínez 34'	Report	Vergé 1'	Stadium: Quarry Studios; MVP: Pol Zapata
	Penalties
	Sanjuán (penalty missed); Lagarde (penalty scored); Martínez (penalty missed); Aja (penalty missed); Viniegra (penalty missed)		(penalty missed) Espinosa; (penalty missed) Rovira; (penalty missed) Ros; (penalty scored) Vergé; (penalty scored) Alba

31 May 2024 Second round 7	Limon FC (Turkey)	2–3	(Spain) Kunisports	Mexico City
14:00	Arda 17' (pen.); Demir 34'	Report	Gaitán 2', 4'; Agüero 17' (pp)	Stadium: Quarry Studios; MVP: Mete Kaan Demir

30 May 2024 Second round 8	SXB FC (Saudi Arabia)	2–2 (2–3 p)	(Spain) xBuyer Team	Mexico City
16:00	Mohamed 2'; Al-Asmari (yellow card) 11'; SHoNgxBoNg 29' (pp)	Report	González 18'; Carbó 19'	Stadium: Quarry Studios; MVP: Roger Carbó
	Penalties
	Gomes (penalty missed); Oliveira (penalty scored); Mohamed (penalty scored); Migulha (penalty missed) d'Oliveira (penalty missed)		(penalty scored) Carbó; (penalty missed) Velillas; (penalty scored) El Amrani; (penalty missed) Beguer; (penalty scored) Alcarazo

=== Losers' Bracket ===
The Losers' Bracket teams who win their second-round match will go to the last-chance round; the losing teams will be eliminated from the World Cup.

29 May 2024 Second round 9	Olimpo United (Mexico)	8–0	(Colombia) Medallo City	Mexico City
16:00	Osuna 1'; Pérez 4'; González 14'; Morales 23'; Román 28' (pp); Salinas 35' (pen.); Rodríguez 35' (x2)	Report		Stadium: Quarry Studios; MVP: Mario Osuna

31 May 2024 Second round 10	UA Steel (Ukraine)	1–9	(Japan) Murash FC	Mexico City
19:00	Moriyasu 7' (o.g.)	Report	Kobayashi 3'; Kato 31' (pp); Kanetake 36'; Kiyokawa 40' (x2), 40+2' (x2); Hirai 40+1' (x2)	Stadium: Quarry Studios; MVP: Keisuke Fukaya

31 May 2024 Second round 11	Real Titán (Chile)	4–5	(United States) Los Aliens 1021	Mexico City
17:00	Rodríguez (yellow card) 14'; Hernández 16' (pen.) (yellow card) 33'; Pedraza 20+1' (yellow card) 38'; García 24' (x2)	Report	Cabrera 3'; Rebollo 7' 39'; Nieto 14' (yellow card) 38'; Villaluz (yellow card) 20'; Castro 36' (pp)	Stadium: Quarry Studios; MVP: Omar Láscari

30 May 2024 Second round 12	Muchachos FC (Argentina)	4–1	(Germany) Youniors FC	Mexico City
15:00	Martínez 1'; Villa 22' (pen.), 27'; Hernández 36'	Report	Dombrowka 5'	Stadium: Quarry Studios; MVP: Emanuel Villa

29 May 2024 Second round 13	Deptostra FC (Belgium)	3–4	(Spain) PIO FC	Mexico City
14:00	Jaadi 3'; Oger 9'; Masoudi 20+1'	Report	Mongil 14', 30'; Omabegho 20'; Ropero 20'	Stadium: Quarry Studios; MVP: Carlos Omabegho

30 May 2024 Second round 14	1K FC (Spain)	6–5	(Colombia) West Santos FC	Mexico City
19:00	Granero; Pluvins 19'	Report	WestCol 18' (pp); Rodríguez 20', 20+2' (yellow card) 35'; Celada 40+3' (x2)	Stadium: Quarry Studios; MVP: Marc Granero

31 May 2024 Second round 15	Jijantes FC (Spain)	3–0 (w/o)	(England) FIVE FC	Mexico City
15:00		Report		Stadium: Quarry Studios
Note: FIVE FC withdrew from the match before it started, reporting several indisposed players.

30 May 2024 Second round 16	Persas FC (Peru)	2–1	(Dominican Republic) Galácticos del Caribe	Mexico City
17:00	Monterde (yellow card) 2'; ElZeein 24' (pp); Olmedo 31'; Díaz (yellow card) 40+2'; Cid (yellow card) 40+3'	Report	Junco 3'	Stadium: Quarry Studios; MVP: Fernando Olmedo

=== Last-chance round ===
Winning teams advance to the knockout stage, losing teams are eliminated from the World Cup.

2 June 2024 Last-chance round	Stallions (Italy)	2–0	(Peru) Persas FC	Mexico City
14:00	Trombetta 22', 38' (pen.); Valtulini (yellow card) 23'; Marin (yellow card) 30'			Stadium: Quarry Studios; MVP: Michele Trombetta

2 June 2024 Last-chance round	Raniza FC (Uruguay)	3–4	(Spain) Jijantes FC	Mexico City
17:00	Obed Martínez 1'; Arias 14'; Ochoa 23'		Romero 6' (pp); Díaz 16'; Quesada 32' (x2)	Stadium: Quarry Studios; MVP: José Segovia

2 June 2024 Last-chance round	Ultimate Móstoles (Spain)	7–1	(Spain) 1K FC	Mexico City
11:00	de la Mata 1', 19' de la Bella 2'; Coro 8'; DjMaRiiO 15' (pp); Ubón 18' (pen.), 31'; Pizarro (yellow card) 21'		de la Cruz 20'; Ruiz (yellow card) 21'	Stadium: Quarry Studios; MVP: Cristian Ubón

2 June 2024 Last-chance round	Saiyans FC (Spain)	4–3	(Spain) PIO FC	Mexico City
15:00	Pérez 2'; P. Fernández 24'; A. Fernández 40+3' (x2)		Iv. López 26' (pen.), 38' (pen.); Ropero 36'; Cano (yellow card) 40+5'	Stadium: Quarry Studios; MVP: Iván López

2 June 2024 Last-chance round	Foot2Rue (France)	4–4 (3–4 p)	(Argentina) Muchachos FC	Mexico City
12:00	Barka 4'; Ménez 15' (pen.); AmineMaTue 22' (pp); Fofana 33'		Martínez 1', 21' (pen.), 36' (pen.); Orozco 2'	Stadium: Quarry Studios; MVP: Yanis Barka
	Penalties
	Ménez (penalty missed); Barka (penalty scored); Fofana (penalty missed); Valeri (penalty scored); Goguey (penalty missed); Chendri (penalty scored); Bachelet (penalty missed)		(penalty missed) Lugo; (penalty missed) Rebollar; (penalty missed) Martínez; (penalty scored) Villa; (penalty scored) Hernández; (penalty scored) Jiménez; (penalty scored) Cárdenas

2 June 2024 Last-chance round	Club de Cuervos (Mexico)	1–5	(United States) Los Aliens 1021	Mexico City
18:00	Martínez (yellow card) 20+1'; Aja 32'		Rebollo 11', 20', 20+1'; Medina 20'; Rebollar 34'; Trueba (yellow card) 37'	Stadium: Quarry Studios; MVP: Miguel Rebollo

2 June 2024 Last-chance round	Limon FC (Turkey)	2–0	(Japan) Murash FC	Mexico City
16:00	Sezer 5'; Arda 19'; Ural (yellow card) 40+2'			Stadium: Quarry Studios; MVP: Alp Arda

2 June 2024 Last-chance round	SXB FC (Saudi Arabia)	0–3	(Mexico) Olimpo United	Mexico City
13:00			Bueno 16' (pen.); Osuna (yellow card) 40+1'; Salinas 40+4' (x2)	Stadium: Quarry Studios; MVP: Jesús Pérez

== Knockout stage ==
Qualified teams

Team	Qualified via
(Brazil) Furia FC	Winners' Bracket
(Brazil) G3X FC	Winners' Bracket
(Spain) Los Troncos FC	Winners' Bracket
(Spain) Porcinos FC	Winners' Bracket
(Mexico) Peluche Caligari	Winners' Bracket
(Spain) Aniquiladores FC	Winners' Bracket
(Spain) Kunisports	Winners' Bracket
(Spain) xBuyer Team	Winners' Bracket
(Spain) Ultimate Móstoles	Last-chance round
(Argentina) Muchachos FC	Last-chance round
(Mexico) Olimpo United	Last-chance round
(Italy) Stallions	Last-chance round
(Spain) Saiyans FC	Last-chance round
(Turkey) Limon FC	Last-chance round
(Spain) Jijantes FC	Last-chance round
(United States) Los Aliens 1021	Last-chance round

Bracket

Round of 16 (4-5 June – Mexico City)
(Mexico) Peluche Caligari	3
(Turkey) Limon FC	4
(Spain) Porcinos FC	5
(Italy) Stallions	3
(Spain) xBuyer Team	4
(Spain) Jijantes FC	3
(Spain) Los Troncos FC	5
(United States) Los Aliens 1021	4
(Spain) Aniquiladores FC	5 (0)
(Spain) Saiyans FC (p)	5 (2)
(Spain) Kunisports	2
(Mexico) Olimpo United	4
(Brazil) Furia FC	7
(Argentina) Muchachos FC	4
(Brazil) G3X FC	4
(Spain) Ultimate Móstoles	3

Quarter-finals (6 June – Mexico City)
(Turkey) Limon FC	3
(Spain) Porcinos FC	4
(Spain) xBuyer Team	9
(Spain) Los Troncos FC	4
(Spain) Saiyans FC	4
(Mexico) Olimpo United	3
(Brazil) Furia FC	3
(Brazil) G3X FC	5

Semi-finals (8 June – Monterrey)
(Spain) Porcinos FC	7
(Spain) xBuyer Team	3
(Spain) Saiyans FC	3
(Brazil) G3X FC	6

Final (8 June – Monterrey)
(Spain) Porcinos FC	5
(Brazil) G3X FC	3

=== Round of 16 ===
4 June 2024	Aniquiladores FC (Spain)	5–5 (0–2 p)	(Spain) Saiyans FC	Mexico City
14:00	Vergé 2', 36' (pen.); Reyes 4'; Fraile 20'; J. Ruiz 20+1'; Zapata (yellow card) (pso)		Pérez 2'; Martín 3'; Gestí 15'; Liñares 20'; TheGrefg 36' (pp)	Stadium: Quarry Studios; MVP: Mario Reyes
	Penalties
	Vergé (penalty missed); Rovira (penalty missed); Alba (penalty missed); Boumedol (penalty missed)		(penalty missed) Serra; (penalty missed) Gestí; (penalty scored) Liñares; (penalty scored) Martín

4 June 2024	Kunisports (Spain)	2–4	(Mexico) Olimpo United	Mexico City
15:00	Val (yellow card) 8'; Aguilar (yellow card) 19'; Gómez 21' (pen.), 30' (pen.)		Morales 4'; Bueno 20' (pen.), 20+1' (pen.); Román 21' (pp); Mateos (yellow card) 21'; Salinas (yellow card) 23'; Rodríguez (yellow card) 33'	Stadium: Quarry Studios; MVP: Marco Bueno

4 June 2024	G3X FC (Brazil)	4–3	(Spain) Ultimate Móstoles	Mexico City
16:00	Vaz 20+1'; Gaules 37' (pp); Oliveira 40+4' (x2)		Vidal 2'; Honorato 15'; DjMaRiiO 16' (pp)	Stadium: Quarry Studios; MVP: Víctor Vidal

4 June 2024	Furia FC (Brazil)	7–3	(Argentina) Muchachos FC	Mexico City
17:00	O Estagiário 6' (pp); Falcão 19', 27' (pen.); Isidório 20+1'; Melo 25'; Garcia 40+1' (x2)		Martínez 6'; Villa 16' (pen.); Freixas 16' (pp); Hernández (red card) 37'	Stadium: Quarry Studios; MVP: Falcão

5 June 2024	Porcinos FC (Spain)	5–3	(Italy) Stallions	Mexico City
14:00	Gutiérrez 1'; Coll 19', 20'; Liencres 24'; Soriano 36'; Santos (yellow card) 40+3'		Viviano 20'; Tumblurr 25' (pp); Sberna 37'; Trombetta (yellow card) 40+3'	Stadium: Quarry Studios; MVP: Álex Gutiérrez

5 June 2024	Peluche Caligari (Mexico)	3–4	(Turkey) Limon FC	Mexico City
15:00	Guillén 3' (yellow card) 40+2'; Campos 18'; G. Montiel 25' (pp)		Demir 2'; Sezer (yellow card) 13'; Kot 25' (pen.); Sözer 25' (pen.), 34' (pen.)	Stadium: Quarry Studios; MVP: Memos Sözer

5 June 2024	xBuyer Team (Spain)	4–3	(Spain) Jijantes FC	Mexico City
16:00	El Amrani 16', 20'; Beguer 27'; Carbó 40'		Díaz 1'; Romero 17' (pp); Espinar 32' (yellow card) 33'	Stadium: Quarry Studios; MVP: Fuad El Amrani

5 June 2024	Los Troncos FC (Spain)	5–4	(United States) Los Aliens 1021	Mexico City
17:00	Marcet 1', 24'; Álvaro 28', 37' (pen.); Ferres 40+3'		Rebollo 2'; Nieto 18' (pen.); Vallejo 18' (yellow card) 27'; Villaluz 33'	Stadium: Quarry Studios; MVP: Edgar Álvaro

=== Quarter-finals ===
6 June 2024	Limon FC (Turkey)	3–4	(Spain) Porcinos FC	Mexico City
14:00	Demir 2'; Arda (yellow card) 3'; Kot 20+1', 24'; Ural (yellow card) 22'; Sezer (yellow card) 28'; Naz (red card) 40+3'		Louah 4', 15'; Llanos 30' (pp); Hernández 33' (pen.)	Stadium: Quarry Studios; MVP: Serhat Kot

6 June 2024	xBuyer Team (Spain)	9–4	(Spain) Los Troncos FC	Mexico City
15:00	Beguer 1', 40+3' (x2); Carbó 6', 20'; MiniBuyer 21' (pp); González 22'; Velillas 24'; El Amrani 28'		Verdú 20', 28' (pen.); Marcet 20+1'; Álvaro 36'	Stadium: Quarry Studios; MVP: Fuad El Amrani

6 June 2024	Saiyans FC (Spain)	4–3	(Mexico) Olimpo United	Mexico City
16:00	P. Fernández 20+1'; TheGrefg 35' (pp); López 36'; Liñares 38' (pen.)		Domínguez 18'; Osuna 19', 38' (pen.); Salinas (yellow card) 40'	Stadium: Quarry Studios; MVP: Dani Pérez

6 June 2024	Furia FC (Brazil)	3–5	(Brazil) G3X FC	Mexico City
17:00	Pinheiro 1', 3'; O Estagiário 7' (pp)		Vaz 15'; Oliveira 16' (pen.), 20+1', 29' (pen.), 38' (pen.); Bueno (yellow card) 40+3'	Stadium: Quarry Studios; MVP: Kelvin Oliveira

=== Semi-finals ===
8 June 2024	Porcinos FC (Spain)	7–3	(Spain) xBuyer Team	Monterrey
19:30	Gutiérrez 1' (pen.); Briones 2'; Louah 20'; Llanos 25' (pp); Hernández 29', 40+4' (x2)		González 7'; Martínez (yellow card) 10'; Velillas 27' (pen.); Beguer 36'; González (yellow card) 40+1'	Stadium: Estadio BBVA; Attendance: 51,237; MVP: Marc Briones

8 June 2024	Saiyans FC (Spain)	3–6	(Brazil) G3X FC	Monterrey
20:45	Gestí 16'; Liñares 25' (pen.), 38' (pen.)		Vaz 2'; Menoci 18'; Souza (yellow card) 25'; Oliveira 35', 38' (pen.), 40+1' (x2)	Stadium: Estadio BBVA; Attendance: 51,237; MVP: Kelvin Oliveira

=== Final ===
8 June 2024	Porcinos FC (Spain)	5–3	(Brazil) G3X FC	Monterrey
22:30	Louah 1'; Soriano 12'; Hernández 20+1'; Santos 26'; Gutiérrez 29'		Rodrigues 20+2'; Oliveira 29' (pen.), 32' (pen.)	Stadium: Estadio BBVA; Attendance: 51,237; MVP: Kelvin Oliveira

Champion
Porcinos FC
1st title
