= 2026 Kings World Cup Clubs =

Tournament details
- Host country: Italy
- Dates: July 26–August 1
- Teams: 16
- Venue(s): Fonzies Arena Cologno Monzese, Milan

Final positions
- Champions: (Brazil) G3X FC (1st title)
- Runners-up: (Italy) Alpak FC

The 2026 Kings World Cup Clubs is an international seven-a-side football tournament. It is the third edition of the Kings World Cup Clubs, a competition based in the Kings League format created by Gerard Piqué and Ibai Llanos, and features the top clubs from the international versions of the Kings League. Spain's Los Troncos FC are automatically qualified as the defending world champions, having won the 2025 tournament. On 21 May, it was announced that the tournament will take place in Italy from 26 July to 1 August.

== Slot allocation ==
A revised slot allocation was announced on 5 March 2026, with the tournament scaling down from 32 to 16 teams, and not featuring any wildcards for the first time. On 27 March, it was announced that Kings League MENA wouldn't run their Split 1 until October, due to the 2026 Iran war. The two vacant spots left by the split's suspension were given to Kings Cup MENA runners-up FWZ and Kings League Italy Split 2 third-place finishers Stallions, as revealed alongside the host nation announcement on 21 May 2026.

== Format ==
The 2026 Kings World Cup Clubs employs a downsized, 16-team version of the previous years' format, which includes features of a Swiss-system tournament.

First stage

- In the first round, the 16 teams each play one match, with the pairings decided by a random draw, with no restrictions based on nation coincidence.
- All teams advance to the second round, with the teams that won their first-round match going to a 'winner bracket' and the teams that lost going to a 'loser bracket'.
- The teams of the 'winner bracket' that win their second round match will immediately qualify for the knockout stage, while the losing teams will face the winning teams from the 'loser bracket' in a last-chance round. The winners of the last-chance round will join the 'winner bracket' second-round winners in the knockout stage.

Knockout stage

- The knockout stage consists of quarterfinals, semifinals and a final.

== Qualified teams ==
=== Europe ===
Spain

Team	Qualification	Qualified date	Chairperson(s)	Participation
Los Troncos FC	2025 Kings World Cup Clubs champions	June 14, 2025	(Spain) Jaume Cremades (Perxitaa)	3rd (Previous: 2024, 2025)
Porcinos FC	2025 Kings Cup Europe Finals champions	November 24, 2025	(Spain) Ibai Llanos	3rd (Previous: 2024, 2025)
Ultimate Móstoles	Kings League Spain Split 6 regular phase winners	May 3, 2026	(Spain) Mario Alonso (DjMaRiiO)	3rd (Previous: 2024, 2025)
La Capital CF	Kings League Spain Split 6 regular phase standings	May 17, 2026	(Spain) Lamine Yamal and (Argentina) Lautaro del Campo (La Cobra)	2nd (Previous: 2025)

- Los Troncos FC won Split 6, having already qualified; La Capital CF advances to the World Cup as the best team on regular phase standings.

Italy

Team	Qualification	Qualified date	Chairperson(s)	Participation
Underdogs FC	Kings League Italy Split 2 regular phase winners	May 4, 2026	(Italy) Mirko Cisco	1st
Alpak FC	Kings League Italy Split 2 champions	May 18, 2026	(Italy) Alessandro Pagliari (Frenezy)	1st
Stallions	Kings League Italy Split 2 regular phase 3rd place	May 21, 2026	(Italy) Gianmarco Tocco (Blur)	2nd (Previous: 2024)

France

Team	Qualification	Qualified date	Chairperson(s)	Participation
Karasu	Kings League France Split 2 champions	May 17, 2026	(France) Kamel Kebir (Kameto) and Hamza Kerdali (Hamza)	2nd (Previous: 2025)

Germany

Team	Qualification	Qualified date	Chairperson(s)	Participation
No Rules FC	Kings League Germany Split 2 champions	April 26, 2026	(Bosnia and Herzegovina) Hasan and Nick Salihamidžić (Die Brazzos) & (Germany) Bilal Kamarieh	1st

=== Americas ===
Mexico

Team	Qualification	Qualified date	Chairperson(s)	Participation
(Colombia) Atlético Parceros	Kings League Mexico Split 4 regular phase winners	May 3, 2026	(Colombia) James Rodríguez and Angerson García (Pelicanger)	1st
(Colombia) Aniquiladores FC	Kings League Mexico Split 4 champions	May 17, 2026	(Colombia) Juan Guarnizo	2nd (Previous: 2024)

Brazil

Team	Qualification	Qualified date	Chairperson(s)	Participation
Furia FC	2025 Kings Cup America Finals champions	November 21, 2025	(Brazil) Neymar and Cris Guedes	3rd (Previous: 2024, 2025)
DesimpaiN	Kings League Brazil Split 2 regular phase winners	May 4, 2026	(Brazil) Renato Vicente	2nd (Previous: 2025^{A})
G3X FC	Kings League Brazil Split 2 regular phase runners-up	May 15, 2026	(Brazil) Alexandre Borba Chiqueta (Gaules) and Kelvin Oliveira	2nd (Previous: 2024)

- G3X FC advanced to the playoff final after finishing as runners-up in the regular phase; since their opponents, DesimpaiN, had already qualified, they were awarded the spot before the match was played.

=== MENA ===
Team	Qualification	Qualified date	Chairperson(s)	Participation
(Saudi Arabia) DR7	2025 Kings Cup MENA champions	November 14, 2025	(Saudi Arabia) Mufreh Asiri (Drb7h)	1st
(Kuwait) FWZ	2025 Kings Cup MENA runners-up	May 21, 2026	(Kuwait) Fawaz Hamad Al Shammari (Fwaz)	1st

== Schedule ==
Dates for each round have been announced on 18 June 2026.

Stage	Round	Date
First Stage	Round 1	26–27 July
First Stage	Round 2	28–29 July
First Stage	Last Chance round	30 July
Knockout stage
Knockout stage	Quarterfinals	31 July
Knockout stage	Semifinals and Final	1 August

== Squads ==
Teams field a regular roster of 13 players. A system of international loans allows teams to sign up to 2 players on a temporary loan from teams that had not qualified for the World Cup.

Team squads

(Italy) Alpak FC

No.	Pos.	Nation	Player	Date of birth (age)
1	GK	(Italy) ITA	Luigi Castelli	5 June 2003 (aged 23)
3	DF	(Italy) ITA	Vlad Marin	15 May 1995 (aged 31)
4	MF	(Italy) ITA	Federico Lorenzani	25 January 2005 (aged 21)
9	MF	(Spain) ESP	Jero Martín	5 November 1995 (aged 30)
10	FW	(Italy) ITA	Cristian Ronchi	6 January 2005 (aged 21)
13	DF	(Italy) ITA	Thomas Salvaterra	21 January 2001 (aged 25)
17	MF	(Italy) ITA	Nicola Cutrignelli	12 October 1992 (aged 33)
22	MF	(Italy) ITA	Andrea Benedetti	16 January 2003 (aged 23)
23	MF	(Italy) ITA	Alessandro Gelsi	10 July 1997 (aged 29)
27	FW	(Italy) ITA	Gianmarco Massa	4 July 1999 (aged 27)
33	FW	(Italy) ITA	Mauro Veneroso	6 May 1996 (aged 30)
70	FW	(Italy) ITA	Paolo Scienza	17 October 1997 (aged 28)
97	GK	(Italy) ITA	Vittorio Gilli	11 April 1997 (aged 29)

(Colombia) Aniquiladores FC

No.	Pos.	Nation	Player	Date of birth (age)
1	GK	(Mexico) MEX	Erik Fraire	24 September 1993 (aged 32)
5	DF	(Mexico) MEX	Martín Rodríguez	18 May 1998 (aged 28)
7	MF	(Mexico) MEX	Brayan Hernández	14 September 2000 (aged 25)
10	MF	(Mexico) MEX	Daviz Junco	17 August 2000 (aged 25)
11	MF	(Colombia) COL	Brihan Gutiérrez	2 December 1997 (aged 28)
12	GK	(Colombia) COL	Nelson Velandia	24 October 1998 (aged 27)
19	FW	(Mexico) MEX	Jacob Morales	23 September 1995 (aged 30)
20	MF	(Colombia) COL	Brayan González	26 May 2001 (aged 25)
21	DF	(Mexico) MEX	Patricio Arias	24 November 2003 (aged 22)
30	MF	(Mexico) MEX	Obed Martínez	30 March 1996 (aged 30)
47	DF	(Colombia) COL	Denilson Lobón	15 March 1999 (aged 27)
77	FW	(Mexico) MEX	Diego Martínez	25 May 1987 (aged 39)
80	FW	(Colombia) COL	Axur Quintero	15 October 2003 (aged 22)

(Colombia) Atlético Parceros

No.	Pos.	Nation	Player	Date of birth (age)
1	GK	(Colombia) COL	Felipe Urán	8 March 2000 (aged 26)
7	FW	(Colombia) COL	Julio Perea	21 July 1996 (aged 30)
8	DF	(Colombia) COL	Andrés Osorno	7 June 1997 (aged 29)
9	DF	(Colombia) COL	Kevin Mejía	Unknown
10	FW	(Colombia) COL	Angellot Caro	3 December 1988 (aged 37)
11	FW	(Colombia) COL	Maicol Hernández	8 December 1992 (aged 33)
12	GK	(Colombia) COL	Simón Duque	10 July 2001 (aged 25)
17	DF	(Colombia) COL	David Loaiza	3 October 1993 (aged 32)
18	DF	(Colombia) COL	Juan Tilano	18 February 2000 (aged 26)
20	DF	(Colombia) COL	Marlon Ramírez	6 May 2004 (aged 22)
24	FW	(Colombia) COL	Jhon Palacios	3 July 2001 (aged 25)
88	DF	(Colombia) COL	Cristian Hernández	Unknown
99	FW	(Colombia) COL	Alexis Gómez	Unknown

(Brazil) DesimpaiN

No.	Pos.	Nation	Player	Date of birth (age)
1	GK	(Brazil) BRA	Kaiky Souza	14 June 2003 (aged 23)
3	DF	(Brazil) BRA	Andrey Profeta	26 February 1996 (aged 30)
5	DF	(Brazil) BRA	Bolt	14 April 1987 (aged 39)
7	FW	(Brazil) BRA	Luisinho Alves	30 March 1999 (aged 27)
8	DF	(Brazil) BRA	Ailton José	20 February 1995 (aged 31)
10	FW	(Brazil) BRA	Davi Ilario	29 March 2002 (aged 24)
11	MF	(Brazil) BRA	Christian Santos	8 October 1997 (aged 28)
14	DF	(Brazil) BRA	Danilo Alemão	5 January 1999 (aged 27)
16	DF	(Brazil) BRA	Gigante	25 September 1996 (aged 29)
17	FW	(Brazil) BRA	Sujão	14 August 2000 (aged 25)
26	MF	(Brazil) BRA	William Costa	15 March 1998 (aged 28)
77	FW	(Brazil) BRA	Victor Bueno	5 October 2000 (aged 25)
83	GK	(Brazil) BRA	Gui Nascimento	8 March 2004 (aged 22)

(Saudi Arabia) DR7

No.	Pos.	Nation	Player	Date of birth (age)
1	GK	(Qatar) QAT	Mame Cheikh Diop	1 January 1996 (aged 30)
4	DF	(Saudi Arabia) KSA	Nawaf Arwan	31 March 1996 (aged 30)
7	FW	(Saudi Arabia) KSA	Eihab Hooba	13 June 1994 (aged 32)
8	MF	(Brazil) BRA	Gabriel Lopes	15 April 1995 (aged 31)
9	MF	(Saudi Arabia) KSA	Nawaf Alrajhi	10 October 1999 (aged 26)
10	MF	(Brazil) BRA	Chaveirinho	23 September 1996 (aged 29)
11	MF	(Saudi Arabia) KSA	Faris Almaleh	14 November 1994 (aged 31)
16	GK	(Saudi Arabia) KSA	Humood Aldahhan	29 October 1998 (aged 27)
18	DF	(Saudi Arabia) KSA	Osama Baabdullah	18 August 1995 (aged 30)
19	FW	(Saudi Arabia) KSA	Abdullah Alaqeeli	16 April 2001 (aged 25)
20	MF	(Brazil) BRA	Brinquinho	24 February 1995 (aged 31)
44	MF	(England) ENG	Aaron Clarke	22 July 2000 (aged 26)
96	FW	(Brazil) BRA	Helber Júnior	15 January 1996 (aged 30)

(Brazil) Furia FC

No.	Pos.	Nation	Player	Date of birth (age)
1	GK	(Brazil) BRA	Ivo Alves	9 July 1998 (aged 28)
7	MF	(Brazil) BRA	Lucas Nascimento	28 May 1999 (aged 27)
8	MF	(Brazil) BRA	Tambinha	5 October 1989 (aged 36)
9	FW	(Brazil) BRA	Ruan Silvestre	23 October 1996 (aged 29)
10	FW	(Brazil) BRA	Lipão	11 December 1996 (aged 29)
11	FW	(Brazil) BRA	Leleti	24 July 1996 (aged 30)
12	DF	(Brazil) BRA	Jeffinho Honorato	26 September 1995 (aged 30)
13	MF	(Brazil) BRA	Kenu Leandro	15 April 1999 (aged 27)
14	DF	(Brazil) BRA	Matheus Dedo	16 November 2001 (aged 24)
22	DF	(Brazil) BRA	João Pelegrini	8 February 1998 (aged 28)
27	FW	(Brazil) BRA	Pedro Silva	7 February 1994 (aged 32)
33	GK	(Brazil) BRA	Victor Hugo	16 January 1991 (aged 35)
88	DF	(Brazil) BRA	Gegeu	22 March 1995 (aged 31)

(Kuwait) FWZ

No.	Pos.	Nation	Player	Date of birth (age)
1	GK	(Mexico) MEX	Julio Torres	12 January 1999 (aged 27)
5	DF	(Brazil) BRA	Chiclete	17 September 1992 (aged 33)
8	MF	(Brazil) BRA	Alan Rodrigues	23 November 1991 (aged 34)
9	FW	(Uruguay) URU	Lucas Paroldo	16 November 2003 (aged 22)
10	MF	(Brazil) BRA	Léo Gol	14 December 1999 (aged 26)
12	GK	(Colombia) COL	Camilo Gaviria	12 January 1999 (aged 27)
17	DF	(Brazil) BRA	Johnatan Baton	17 December 1987 (aged 38)
18	MF	(Uruguay) URU	Franco Duque	25 November 2004 (aged 21)
19	MF	(Spain) ESP	Pau Recasens	17 June 1999 (aged 27)
23	DF	(Spain) ESP	Carlos Ortiz	3 October 1983 (aged 42)
29	MF	(Brazil) BRA	Gabriel Oliveira	7 February 1993 (aged 33)
88	DF	(Brazil) BRA	Elton Lucas	6 January 1988 (aged 38)
97	FW	(Brazil) BRA	Wesley da Silva	11 September 1997 (aged 28)

(Brazil) G3X FC

No.	Pos.	Nation	Player	Date of birth (age)
1	GK	(Brazil) BRA	Gabriel Braga	23 July 2004 (aged 22)
3	DF	(Brazil) BRA	Wembley Luiz	15 August 1997 (aged 28)
4	DF	(Brazil) BRA	Marinho Filho	16 December 1992 (aged 33)
5	DF	(Brazil) BRA	Gabriel Messias	2 February 2001 (aged 25)
7	MF	(Brazil) BRA	Well Andrade	21 July 1997 (aged 29)
8	MF	(Brazil) BRA	Matheus Rufino	6 February 1998 (aged 28)
9	FW	(Brazil) BRA	Kelvin Oliveira	15 August 1995 (aged 30)
10	MF	(Brazil) BRA	Andreas Vaz	18 May 1995 (aged 31)
11	FW	(Brazil) BRA	João Guimarães	24 February 2000 (aged 26)
12	FW	(Brazil) BRA	Spider	23 November 1990 (aged 35)
33	MF	(Brazil) BRA	Thiago Brito	4 November 1996 (aged 29)
77	FW	(Brazil) BRA	Ryan Lima	17 July 2001 (aged 25)
98	GK	(Brazil) BRA	Josildo Barata	7 July 1998 (aged 28)

(France) Karasu

No.	Pos.	Nation	Player	Date of birth (age)
4	DF	(France) FRA	Sahir Boumhand	10 December 2004 (aged 21)
6	DF	(France) FRA	Mehdi Gacem	5 July 2005 (aged 21)
7	FW	(France) FRA	Moussa Sao	17 October 1989 (aged 36)
10	FW	(France) FRA	Matisse Henry	29 September 2003 (aged 22)
11	FW	(France) FRA	Sita Diarra	22 September 1999 (aged 26)
19	GK	(France) FRA	Guillaume Lesec	7 April 1995 (aged 31)
23	GK	(Cameroon) CMR	Jean Loic	27 March 2000 (aged 26)
24	MF	(France) FRA	Christopher Baptista	28 January 1993 (aged 33)
26	DF	(France) FRA	Geoffroy Arthaud	26 May 1988 (aged 38)
31	MF	(France) FRA	Driss Khalid	7 February 1999 (aged 27)
75	MF	(France) FRA	Junior Sele	26 October 1998 (aged 27)
99	FW	(France) FRA	Dramane Kone	11 April 1992 (aged 34)

(Spain) La Capital CF

No.	Pos.	Nation	Player	Date of birth (age)
1	GK	(Spain) ESP	Manel Jiménez	13 February 2000 (aged 26)
4	DF	(Spain) ESP	Sergi Vives	12 February 2002 (aged 24)
5	DF	(Spain) ESP	Daniel Pérez	11 March 1997 (aged 29)
6	MF	(Spain) ESP	Sohaib Rektout	16 May 2003 (aged 23)
7	FW	(Spain) ESP	Omar Dambelleh	3 November 2001 (aged 24)
8	MF	(Spain) ESP	Daouda Bamma	29 May 2004 (aged 22)
9	FW	(Spain) ESP	Pablo Beguer	30 January 1995 (aged 31)
10	MF	(Spain) ESP	Julen Álvarez	19 February 2001 (aged 25)
11	FW	(Spain) ESP	Antoni Hernández	10 June 1997 (aged 29)
17	FW	(United States) USA	Roc Bancells	7 April 2003 (aged 23)
19	DF	(Spain) ESP	Mario Victorio	10 January 1985 (aged 41)
20	MF	(Spain) ESP	Iñaki Villalba	15 January 2000 (aged 26)
25	GK	(Spain) ESP	Roger García	10 April 1997 (aged 29)

(Spain) Los Troncos FC

No.	Pos.	Nation	Player	Date of birth (age)
1	GK	(Spain) ESP	Eloy Amoedo	10 March 2003 (aged 23)
3	DF	(Spain) ESP	Joan Oriol	5 November 1986 (aged 39)
4	DF	(Spain) ESP	Alex Cubedo	29 May 1999 (aged 27)
6	FW	(Spain) ESP	Gerard Verge	17 February 1998 (aged 28)
7	FW	(Spain) ESP	Carlos Contreras	28 November 1992 (aged 33)
9	FW	(Spain) ESP	Masi Dabo	25 July 2002 (aged 24)
10	FW	(Spain) ESP	Álvaro Arché	19 November 1996 (aged 29)
11	FW	(Spain) ESP	Mark Sorroche	15 June 2004 (aged 22)
13	DF	(Spain) ESP	Sagar Escoto	25 February 2002 (aged 24)
14	MF	(Spain) ESP	Jordi Gómez	24 June 1985 (aged 41)
21	DF	(Spain) ESP	Carles Planas	4 March 1991 (aged 35)
23	MF	(Spain) ESP	David Reyes	27 February 2000 (aged 26)
71	GK	(Ukraine) UKR	Yaroslav Toporkov	27 February 2001 (aged 25)

(Germany) No Rules FC

No.	Pos.	Nation	Player	Date of birth (age)
1	GK	(Germany) GER	Fabio Rasic	6 September 2002 (aged 23)
6	DF	(Germany) GER	Daniel Jelisic	18 February 2000 (aged 26)
7	MF	(Germany) GER	Nick Salihamidžić	8 February 2003 (aged 23)
8	FW	(Brazil) BRA	Gabriel Costa	16 December 1996 (aged 29)
9	DF	(Bosnia and Herzegovina) BIH	Ensar Skrijelj	16 December 1999 (aged 26)
10	MF	(Germany) GER	Amar Cekić	21 December 1992 (aged 33)
11	FW	(Spain) ESP	Gilles Vidal	26 October 2002 (aged 23)
17	FW	(Germany) GER	Serhat Imsak	20 July 1999 (aged 27)
19	FW	(Germany) GER	Nam Nguyen	17 June 2002 (aged 24)
20	MF	(Germany) GER	Albin Zekiri	4 December 2003 (aged 22)
21	DF	(Spain) ESP	Diego de la Mata	3 March 1993 (aged 33)
25	FW	(Germany) GER	Anthony Manuba	12 July 2003 (aged 23)
77	DF	(Germany) GER	Diren Günay	5 October 2003 (aged 22)

(Spain) Porcinos FC

No.	Pos.	Nation	Player	Date of birth (age)
3	DF	(Morocco) MAR	Nadir Louah	29 May 2003 (aged 23)
7	FW	(Spain) ESP	Nico Santos	7 February 2000 (aged 26)
8	MF	(Spain) ESP	Marc Pelaz	19 September 2003 (aged 22)
9	FW	(Spain) ESP	Edgar Álvaro	14 January 2000 (aged 26)
10	MF	(Spain) ESP	Óscar Coll	19 June 2000 (aged 26)
11	FW	(Spain) ESP	Roger Carbó	4 June 1998 (aged 28)
13	GK	(Spain) ESP	Víctor Rodríguez	23 August 2002 (aged 23)
14	MF	(Spain) ESP	Franc Samaniego	18 January 2002 (aged 24)
16	DF	(Spain) ESP	Àlex Gutiérrez	11 March 1994 (aged 32)
20	MF	(Spain) ESP	Cristian Lobato	3 July 1989 (aged 37)
21	DF	(Spain) ESP	David Soriano	5 January 2000 (aged 26)
25	GK	(Spain) ESP	Dani Pérez	7 October 1998 (aged 27)
80	MF	(Morocco) MAR	Fouad El Amrani	8 August 1993 (aged 32)

(Italy) Stallions

No.	Pos.	Nation	Player	Date of birth (age)
1	GK	(Italy) ITA	Gianluca Bressan	17 December 2003 (aged 22)
5	DF	(Italy) ITA	Andrea Becchi	25 July 1996 (aged 30)
6	DF	(Italy) ITA	Marco Evangelisti	2 December 2000 (aged 25)
7	FW	(Serbia) SRB	Dennis Stojkovic	3 August 2002 (aged 23)
10	FW	(Italy) ITA	Alessandro Colombo	4 July 2001 (aged 25)
17	MF	(Italy) ITA	Pietro Brusadelli	16 April 2004 (aged 22)
19	MF	(Italy) ITA	Giacomo Pennetta	19 September 2002 (aged 23)
25	GK	(Italy) ITA	Samuele Guddo	2 July 1999 (aged 27)
30	MF	(Italy) ITA	Niccolò Marino	24 October 1999 (aged 26)
52	DF	(Italy) ITA	Alessandro Di Dio	20 October 1993 (aged 32)
73	DF	(Italy) ITA	Filippo Adamo	18 August 2003 (aged 22)
77	FW	(Italy) ITA	Simone Lo Faso	18 February 1998 (aged 28)

(Spain) Ultimate Móstoles

No.	Pos.	Nation	Player	Date of birth (age)
1	GK	(Spain) ESP	Víctor Vidal	14 November 1999 (aged 26)
5	DF	(Spain) ESP	David Grifell	3 September 2000 (aged 25)
6	MF	(Spain) ESP	Aleix Lage	26 August 1991 (aged 34)
7	DF	(Spain) ESP	Marc Granero	20 August 2001 (aged 24)
8	MF	(Spain) ESP	Javier Espinosa	19 September 1992 (aged 33)
9	MF	(Spain) ESP	Capi	25 May 2001 (aged 25)
10	MF	(Spain) ESP	Dani Liñares	16 May 1998 (aged 28)
13	GK	(Spain) ESP	Juan Lorente	31 January 2001 (aged 25)
14	MF	(Spain) ESP	Luis García	25 January 1995 (aged 31)
23	DF	(Spain) ESP	Iván Torres	27 February 1999 (aged 27)
66	DF	(Spain) ESP	Eloy Pizarro	18 September 2002 (aged 23)
69	FW	(Russia) RUS	Mikhail Prokopev	27 August 2002 (aged 23)
92	FW	(Spain) ESP	Aleix Martí	19 October 2004 (aged 21)

(Italy) Underdogs FC

No.	Pos.	Nation	Player	Date of birth (age)
2	DF	(Brazil) BRA	Lyncoln Oliveira	22 January 1997 (aged 29)
6	MF	(Brazil) BRA	Canhoto	25 April 2001 (aged 25)
8	MF	(Italy) ITA	Alessandro Cannataro	20 April 1995 (aged 31)
9	FW	(Italy) ITA	Jorginho Fernandes	24 November 1989 (aged 36)
10	FW	(Italy) ITA	Matteo Perrotti	17 April 1999 (aged 27)
11	MF	(Italy) ITA	Domenico Rossi	9 May 2000 (aged 26)
17	MF	(Italy) ITA	Mario Prezioso	15 April 1996 (aged 30)
19	DF	(Italy) ITA	Andrea Gorgoglione	19 December 2003 (aged 22)
22	GK	(Italy) ITA	Gianmarco Chironi	7 September 1999 (aged 26)
24	DF	(Italy) ITA	Riccardo Bertaglio	19 September 1996 (aged 29)
32	DF	(Italy) ITA	Tommaso Caldera	2 July 2004 (aged 22)
77	FW	(Italy) ITA	Giovanni Zito	11 August 2003 (aged 22)
99	GK	(Italy) ITA	Roberto Taliento	8 July 1999 (aged 27)

== Broadcast ==
The entire tournament will be livestreamed on Twitch, YouTube and Kick, both from the official Kings League channels and individual feeds from the teams' chairpersons.

== First stage ==
=== First round ===
The first-round pairings were drawn on 6 June 2026.

Team 1	Score	Team 2
Alpak FC (Italy)	7–5	(Germany) No Rules FC
Karasu (France)	1–5	(Brazil) G3X FC
Los Troncos FC (Spain)	1–6	(Saudi Arabia) DR7
Underdogs FC (Italy)	8–2	(Spain) La Capital CF
Stallions (Italy)	6–5	(Brazil) DesimpaiN
Ultimate Móstoles (Spain)	6–3	(Colombia) Aniquiladores FC
Porcinos FC (Spain)	3–5	(Brazil) Furia FC
Atlético Parceros (Colombia)	6–3	(Kuwait) FWZ

26 July 2026
19:00 CEST

Alpak FC (Italy)	7–5	(Germany) No Rules FC
Gilli 1', 3'; Martín 4'; Frenezy 9' (pp); Ronchi 21'; Marin 34' (pen.); Benedetti 37'	Report	Günay 20' (x2); Costa 22'; Imsak 25' (x2); Skrijelj (yellow card) 34'

Fonzies Arena Cologno Monzese, Milan
26 July 2026
20:00 CEST

Los Troncos FC (Spain)	1–6	(Saudi Arabia) DR7
Escoto (yellow card) 14'; Gómez 37' (pen.)	Report	Diop 2', 22', 22'; Alaqeeli 16'; Chaveirinho 26' (pen.); Almaleh (yellow card) 37'; Brinquinho 43'

Fonzies Arena Cologno Monzese, Milan
26 July 2026
21:00 CEST

Ultimate Móstoles (Spain)	6–3	(Colombia) Aniquiladores FC
Vidal 1'; Torres 3'; Martí 17', 27' (pen.), 39'; DjMaRiiO 26' (pp)	Report	Velandia 1'; Gutiérrez 14'; Quintero 35' (pen.); Morales (yellow card) 35'

Fonzies Arena Cologno Monzese, Milan
26 July 2026
22:00 CEST

Stallions (Italy)	6–5	(Brazil) DesimpaiN
Guddo 1', 2'; Stojkovic 16'; Blur 29' (pp); Di Dio 36'; Colombo 44'	Report	Gigante 12', 23'; José (yellow card) 17'; Oliveira (yellow card) 26'; Santos 35' (pen.), 43'; Bueno 40'

Fonzies Arena Cologno Monzese, Milan
27 July 2026
19:00 CEST

Underdogs FC (Italy)	8–2	(Spain) La Capital CF
Chironi 1', 1'; Oliveira 3', 39' (yellow card) 35'; Fernandes 21'; Perrotti 22'; Rossi 24' (pen.); Caldera 30'	Report	Dambelleh 8'; Rektout 27' (pen.) (yellow card) 29'

Fonzies Arena Cologno Monzese, Milan
27 July 2026
20:00 CEST

Atlético Parceros (Colombia)	6–3	(Kuwait) FWZ
Palacios (yellow card) 5'; M. Hernández 10', 30', 32'; Loaiza (yellow card) 28'; Caro 35' (pen.); C. Hernández 36'; Ramírez 42'	Report	Recasens (yellow card) 9'; Chiclete 22'; Lucas (red card) 32'; Al Fawzan 32' (pp); Léo Gol 41' (yellow card) 42'

Fonzies Arena Cologno Monzese, Milan
27 July 2026
21:00 CEST

Karasu (France)	1–5	(Brazil) G3X FC
Lesec 1'	Report	Brito 25'; Andrade 27'; Oliveira 36' (x2); Vaz 40'

Fonzies Arena Cologno Monzese, Milan
27 July 2026
22:00 CEST

Porcinos FC (Spain)	3–5	(Brazil) Furia FC
Pérez 1'; El Amrani 21'; Pelaz 23'	Report	Lipão 1', 5' (pen.); Silvestre 4'; Leandro 11'; Leleti 40'

Fonzies Arena Cologno Monzese, Milan

=== Second round ===
==== Winners' bracket ====
Team 1	Score	Team 2
Alpak FC (Italy)	2–5	(Brazil) G3X FC
DR7 (Saudi Arabia)	4–5	(Italy) Underdogs FC
Stallions (Italy)	7–9	(Spain) Ultimate Móstoles
Furia FC (Brazil)	11–2	(Colombia) Atlético Parceros

28 July 2026
19:00 CEST

Alpak FC (Italy)	2–5	(Brazil) G3X FC
Gelsi 23'; Frenezy 33' (pp); Cutrignelli (yellow card) 34'	Report	Oliveira 1', 38'; Spider 21', 26'; Massa 33' (rp)

Fonzies Arena Cologno Monzese, Milan
28 July 2026
20:00 CEST

DR7 (Saudi Arabia)	4–5	(Italy) Underdogs FC
Junior 1', 19' (x2); Arwan 37'; Chaveirinho (red card) 37'	Report	Chironi 1'; Oliveira 3'; Canhoto (yellow card) 6'; Perroti 10', 37'; D'errico 36' (pen.)

Fonzies Arena Cologno Monzese, Milan
28 July 2026
22:00 CEST

Stallions (Italy)	7–9	(Spain) Ultimate Móstoles
Stojkovic 1'; Colombo 21', 23', 32'; Lo Faso 30' (x2); Blur 31' (pp)	Report	García 1'; Martí 5', 13', 22', 23', 31', 39'; DjMaRiiO 31' (pp); Torres 33'

Fonzies Arena Cologno Monzese, Milan
29 July 2026
22:00 CEST

Furia FC (Brazil)	11–2	(Colombia) Atlético Parceros
Lipão 1', 3', 32' (pen.); Silvestre 5'; Guedes 10' (pp); Dedo 23', 31', 41'; Honorato 23', 36'; Leleti 35'	Report	Urán (red card) 2'; Tilano (yellow card) 8'; M. Hernández 21'; Tambinha 31' (rp); Duque (yellow card) 34'

Fonzies Arena Cologno Monzese, Milan

==== Losers' bracket ====
Team 1	Score	Team 2
No Rules FC (Germany)	6–5	(France) Karasu
Los Troncos FC (Spain)	7–4	(Spain) La Capital CF
DesimpaiN (Brazil)	5–0	(Colombia) Aniquiladores FC
Porcinos FC (Spain)	(1) 4–4 (4)	(Kuwait) FWZ

28 July 2026
21:00 CEST

DesimpaiN (Brazil)	5–0	(Colombia) Aniquiladores FC
Souza 1'; Gigante 6' (yellow card) 34'; Alves 21'; Vicente 36' (pp); José 39'	Report

Fonzies Arena Cologno Monzese, Milan
29 July 2026
19:00 CEST

No Rules FC (Germany)	6–5	(France) Karasu
Jelisic (yellow card) 8'; Costa 18' (x2), 41'; Imsak 21'; Kone 32' (rp); Vidal 33' (pen.)	Report	Khalid (yellow card) 7'; Henry 21'; Gacem 22'; Boumhand 27' (yellow card) 33'; Diarra 29'; Baptista 38'

Fonzies Arena Cologno Monzese, Milan
29 July 2026
20:00 CEST

Los Troncos FC (Spain)	7–4	(Spain) La Capital CF
Planas 1'; Gómez 17'; Sorroche 21', 40'; Oriol 30'; Perxitaa 31' (pp); Dabo 36'	Report	Hernández 20' (x2), 26'; Rektout 22' (yellow card) 36'

Fonzies Arena Cologno Monzese, Milan
29 July 2026
21:00 CEST

Porcinos FC (Spain)	4–4	(Kuwait) FWZ
Pérez 1', 1'; Santos 13' (pen.); Carbó 15'	Report	Léo Gol (yellow card) 19'; Da Silva 23'; Chichlete 27', 28'; Fwaz 31' (pp)
Penalties
El Amrani (penalty missed); Álvaro (penalty missed); Soriano (penalty scored)	1–4	(penalty scored) Léo Gol; (penalty scored) Rodrigues; (penalty scored) Baton; (penalty scored) Chiclete

Fonzies Arena Cologno Monzese, Milan

=== Last Chance round ===
Team 1	Score	Team 2
Alpak FC (Italy)	5–3	(Kuwait) FWZ
DR7 (Saudi Arabia)	1–3	(Brazil) DesimpaiN
Stallions (Italy)	5–8	(Spain) Los Troncos FC
Atlético Parceros (Colombia)	6–5	(Germany) No Rules FC

30 July 2026
19:00 CEST

Alpak FC (Italy)	5–3	(Kuwait) FWZ
Frenezy 26' (pp); Ronchi 27', 32' (x2); Scienza 37'	Report	Gaviria 2'; Baton 22'; Léo Gol 33' (pen.)

Fonzies Arena Cologno Monzese, Milan
30 July 2026
20:00 CEST

Atlético Parceros (Colombia)	6–5	(Germany) No Rules FC
Duque 1'; M. Hernández 15'; Caro 22'; Pelicanger 25' (pp); Loaiza 40', 40'	Report	Vidal 1', 21' de la Mata (yellow card) 12'; Costa 27', 30' (pen.); Günay 33'

Fonzies Arena Cologno Monzese, Milan
30 July 2026
21:00 CEST

DR7 (Saudi Arabia)	1–3	(Brazil) DesimpaiN
Alaqeeli 1'; Helber Júnior (yellow card) 34'	Report	Souza 1'; Oliveira 23'; Bolt 38'

Fonzies Arena Cologno Monzese, Milan
30 July 2026
22:00 CEST

Stallions (Italy)	5–8	(Spain) Los Troncos FC
Colombo 1', 22', 23'; Marino 4' (yellow card) 36'; Lo Faso 21'; Di Dio (yellow card) 36'	Report	Oriol 15', 21', 36' (pen.), 37'; Sorroche 22', 36' (pen.); Planas 23'; Arché (yellow card) 29'; Perxitaa 29' (pp)

Fonzies Arena Cologno Monzese, Milan

== Knockout stage ==
Qualified teams

Team	Qualified via
(Brazil) G3X FC	Winners' bracket
(Italy) Underdogs FC	Winners' bracket
(Spain) Ultimate Móstoles	Winners' bracket
(Brazil) Furia FC	Winners' bracket
(Italy) Alpak FC	Last-chance round
(Brazil) DesimpaiN	Last-chance round
(Spain) Los Troncos FC	Last-chance round
(Colombia) Atlético Parceros	Last-chance round

The knockout stage bracket was drawn on 30 July, before the start of the last-chance round.

Quarter-finals (31 July)
(Brazil) Furia FC	5
(Spain) Los Troncos FC	1
(Italy) Underdogs FC	5 (1)
(Italy) Alpak FC (p)	5 (3)
(Spain) Ultimate Móstoles (p)	5 (1)
(Colombia) Atlético Parceros	5 (0)
(Brazil) G3X FC	6
(Brazil) DesimpaiN	5

Semi-finals (1 August)
(Brazil) Furia FC	4
(Italy) Alpak FC	6
(Spain) Ultimate Móstoles	2
(Brazil) G3X FC	8

Final (1 August)
(Italy) Alpak FC	5
(Brazil) G3X FC	9

=== Quarter finals ===
31 July 2026
19:00 CEST

Ultimate Móstoles (Spain)	5–5	(Colombia) Atlético Parceros
Martí 1', 23' (pen.); Liñares 11'; García 17'; DjMaRiiO 36' (pp)	Report	M. Hernández 4', 35' (pen.); C. Hernández 13', 21' (pen.); Loaiza 22'; Osorno (yellow card) 29'
Penalties
García (penalty missed); Liñares (penalty scored); Granero (penalty missed); Martí (penalty missed)	1–0	(penalty missed) Caro; (penalty missed) Loaiza; (penalty missed) M. Hernández; (penalty missed) C. Hernández; (penalty missed) Gómez

Fonzies Arena Cologno Monzese, Milan
31 July 2026
20:00 CEST

Underdogs FC (Italy)	5–5	(Italy) Alpak FC
Chironi 1'; Perrotti 2'; Prezioso (yellow card) 14'; Rossi 22'; Oliveira 23'; Massa 32' (rp)	Report	Gilli 1', 22'; Veneroso 21'; Marin 27' (pen.); Frenezy 35' (pp)
Penalties
Canhoto (penalty scored); D'errico (penalty missed); Perrotti (penalty missed); Fernandes (penalty missed)	1–3	(penalty scored) Scienza; (penalty scored) Benedetti; (penalty scored) Ronchi; (penalty missed) Martín

Fonzies Arena Cologno Monzese, Milan
31 July 2026
21:00 CEST

Furia FC (Brazil)	5–1	(Spain) Los Troncos FC
Lipão 1', 21', 22'; Leleti 23'; Leandro (yellow card) 34'; Dedo 40'	Report	Reyes (yellow card) 20'; Perxitaa 25' (pp)

Fonzies Arena Cologno Monzese, Milan
31 July 2026
22:00 CEST

G3X FC (Brazil)	6–5	(Brazil) DesimpaiN
Oliveira 3' (pen.), 22'; Vaz 4'; Andrade 22'; Gaules 32' (pp); Spider 45'	Report	Gigante 23'; Vicente 25' (pp); Messias 27' (rp); Alves 43', 44'

Fonzies Arena Cologno Monzese, Milan

=== Semi finals ===
1 August 2026
19:00 CEST

Furia FC (Brazil)	4–6	(Italy) Alpak FC
Lipão 21', 23', 37' (pen.); Guedes 28' (pp)	Report	Martín 2', 21'; Scienza 23'; Frenezy 31' (pp); Veneroso 37' (pen.); Gelsi 38'

Fonzies Arena Cologno Monzese, Milan
1 August 2026
20:00 CEST

Ultimate Móstoles (Spain)	2–8	(Brazil) G3X FC
Torres 4'; Espinosa 25'; Pizarro (yellow card) 36'	Report	Spider 2', 21'; Oliveira 19' (x2), 23', 29' (pen.), 40'; Gaules 25' (pp)

Fonzies Arena Cologno Monzese, Milan

=== Final ===
1 August 2026
21:30 CEST

Alpak FC (Italy)	5–9	(Brazil) G3X
Gilli 1'; Ronchi 23'; Scienza (yellow card) 27'; Gelsi (yellow card) 31' (goal) 39', 40'; Cutrignelli 41'	Report	Oliveira 1', 3', 13', 19' (x2), 27' (pen.); Vaz 21', 42'; Andrade 22'

Fonzies Arena Cologno Monzese, Milan

Champion
G3X FC
1st title

== Notes ==
^{A} DesimpaiN competed in the 2025 Kings World Cup Clubs under the name Desimpedidos Goti.
