= Kings League Italy =

- Founded: 18 November 2024; 23 months ago
- First season: 3 February 2025
- Country: Italy
- Confederation: Kings League
- Number of clubs: 12
- International cup: Kings World Cup Clubs
- Current champions: TRM (1st title) (2025 Winter Split (inaugural))
- Most championships: TRM (1)
- Broadcasters: Sky Sport, NOW, Twitch, YouTube
- Website: kingsleague.pro/en/italia

Kings League Italy is the Italian arm of the Kings League, the seven-a-side streaming football competition that Gerard Piqué and Ibai Llanos founded in Spain in 2023. Its full title-sponsorship name is Kings League Lottomatica.sport Italy. The Swedish striker Zlatan Ibrahimović fronted the launch as league president on 18 November 2024, and the first matchday was played at the Fonzies Arena in Milan on 3 February 2025.

Twelve clubs take part. Each is fronted by a "president" from Italian sport, music or streaming culture. The rapper Fedez, the former Italy midfielder Claudio Marchisio (who also runs the league as head of competition) and the Juventus-aligned Zebras FC are among the names involved. The inaugural season ran from February to May 2025 over eleven matchdays and a play-off round. TRM, with the former Serie A striker Ciccio Caputo on the pitch, beat FC Zeta 10-2 in the final at the Inalpi Arena in Turin in front of an announced crowd of more than 15,000.

Italy was the third Kings League regional franchise behind Spain and the Americas. It was also the first European edition, opening ahead of the German, French and Brazilian leagues that followed later in 2025. Matches stream live on Twitch and YouTube. The pay-TV channel Sky Sport and the streaming service NOW carry a delayed window.

== History ==
Piqué's Kosmos holding and Ibai Llanos launched the original Spanish Kings League in January 2023. Twelve celebrity-fronted clubs, video-game-style "secret weapons" and Twitch as the main broadcaster set the template. A parallel Americas league with the Mexican streamer Werevertumorro followed in 2024. By the end of that year Kings League had started licensing out individual European franchises.

The Italian unveil came in Milan on 18 November 2024. Piqué and Ibai presented the twelve clubs alongside Ibrahimović. A panel of former Italy internationals (Andrea Pirlo, Francesco Totti, Gianluigi Buffon, Alessandro Del Piero and Giorgio Chiellini) joined them as commentators and brand ambassadors. Marchisio took the role of head of competition. The calendar and the venue, a refit of the Vismara-Fondazione Gnocchi sports complex in Milan rebranded as the Fonzies Arena, were confirmed two months later.

Matchday 1 was played on 3 February 2025. The regular season ran for eleven Monday-evening matchdays, six games back-to-back from 5pm to 11pm, all streamed live. TRM finished a point clear of FC Zeta in the regular-season table. The two met again at the Inalpi Arena, where TRM ran out 10-2 winners. Four Italian clubs (TRM, FC Zeta, Gear7 and Boomers) went on to the 2025 Kings World Cup Clubs in Paris. The 2025-26 season replaced the Apertura-style Winter and Summer Split structure with a Kings Cup played between October and December 2025, then a longer spring league. Two new clubs joined for the cup phase, taking the field to fourteen.

== Format ==
Kings League Italy plays by the parent Spanish rules. Each match is seven-against-seven over two twenty-minute halves. Substitutions are unlimited, and sin-bin time-outs replace straight red cards.Each side can play one "secret weapon" card per match, drawn from a deck before kick-off, which triggers an in-game rule modifier. The last two minutes of every match run as a golden goal period.

== Teams ==
The twelve clubs in the inaugural season, with their team presidents:

Kings League Italy clubs (2025 Winter Split)
Club	President(s)	Notes
Stallions	Blur	Twitch streamer
Punchers	PirlasV	Twitch streamer
Zebras FC	Luca Campolunghi	Alliance with Juventus
GrenBaud Circus	Grenbaud	YouTuber and gaming content creator
FC Zeta	ZW Jackson	Twitch streamer, inaugural runners-up
Caesar	Er Faina (Damiano Coccia) and En3rix (Andrea Pirrera)	Football streamers, known from the Controcalcio show
TRM	Marzaa	Inaugural champions, led on the pitch by Ciccio Caputo
Gear7	Manuuxo (Emanuele Nocera)	Twitch streamer, former Catanzaro youth player
Underdogs	Mirko Cisco (Mirko Virgilio)	Football tipster on Instagram
Alpac	Frenezy (Alessandro Pagliari)	Streamer known for Call of Duty and EA Sports FC content
Lotus	Sergio Cruz, Off Samuel (Samuel Afriyie)	Former Brazilian Serie C player and football YouTuber
Boomers	Fedez	Featuring former Juventus general manager Luciano Moggi

== Seasons ==
Kings League Italy finals
Season	Champion	Score	Runner-up	Venue
2025 Winter Split	TRM	10-2	FC Zeta	Inalpi Arena, Turin

== Broadcasting ==
Live matches stream on Twitch and YouTube via the league's official Kings League Lottomatica.sport Italy channels. A delayed window runs on Sky Sport and on the OTT service NOW. Lottomatica, part of the Italian gaming group Lottomatica Group, holds title sponsorship for the 2025 and 2025-26 seasons.

== See also ==
- Kings League
- Kings World Cup Clubs
- Kings World Cup Nations
- Baller League
