= Junichi Kato (streamer) =

Japanese YouTuber and streamer (born 1985)

- 加藤 純一
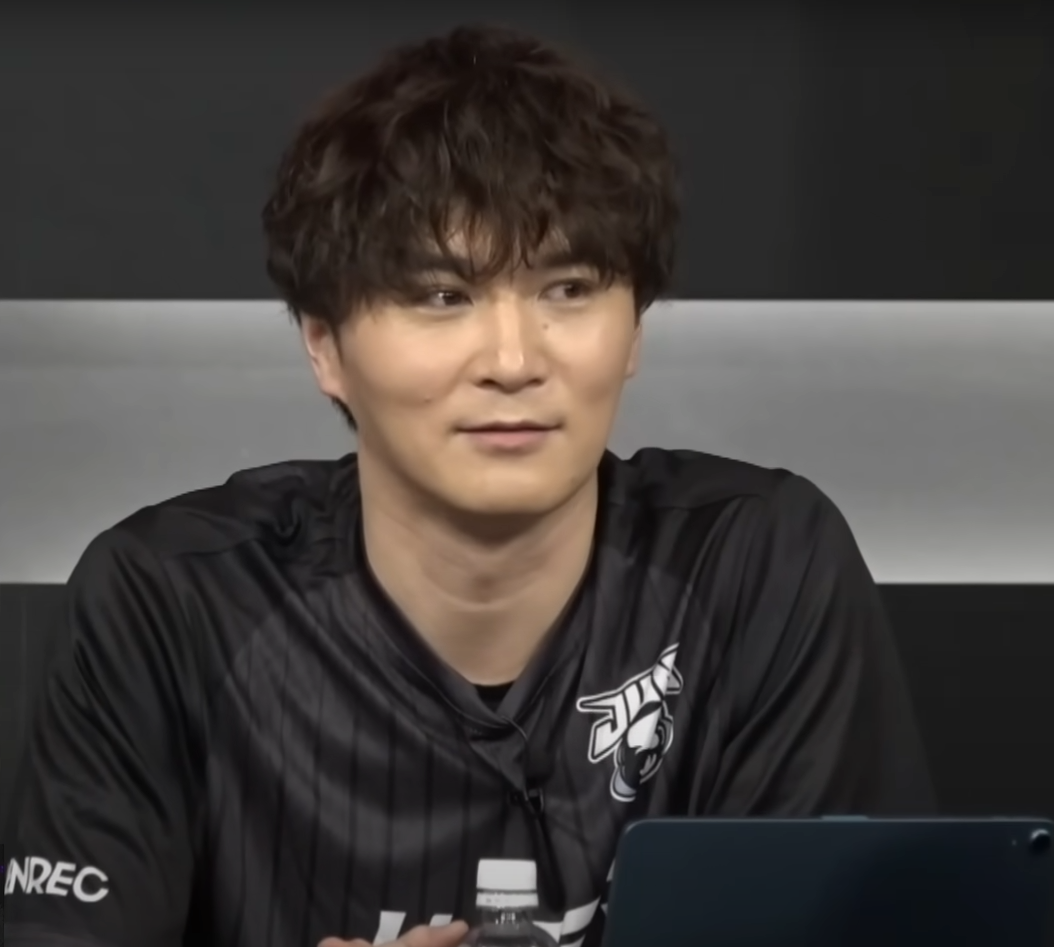
- March 2024
- Born: 17 August 1985 (age 41); Tateyama, Chiba Prefecture, Japan
- Other name: Unko-chan (うんこちゃん)
- Education: Awa Senior High School
- Occupations: Streamer; tarento
- Years active: 2009–present
- Height: 176 cm (5 ft 9 in)
- Spouse: Sachiko (m. 2022; div. 2025)

Twitch information
- Channel: 加藤純一うん〇ちゃん
- Years active: 2020–present
- Followers: 1.12 million

YouTube information
- Channel: 加藤純一【jun channel】
- Years active: 2016–present
- Subscribers: 1.28 million
- Views: 1.13 billion
- Last updated: November 7, 2025

Junichi Kato (加藤 純一, Katō Junichi; born 17 August 1985), also known as Unko-chan (うんこちゃん) is a Japanese streamer, YouTuber and tarento. He is mainly active on Niconico (Niconico Live), YouTube, Twitch and Abema. His talent agency is MURASH. He is also the owner of the professional gaming team "Murash Gaming" and the beauty salon "CUT Jun" (CUT純) in Tokyo.

== Early life and career ==
Kato was born in Tateyama, Chiba.

On 5 July 2009, Kato posted his first Let's Play video on Niconico. At the time of posting "Complete Pokémon video games on 6 screens at once" (ポケモン6画面で一気にクリアしてやんよ) on 12 July, his Niconico's username was "Unko-chan", so he called himself "Unko-chan".

While Kato worked as a health professional, he continued to stream Let's Play videos as Unko-chan. In 2015, Kato announced that his real name is Junichi Kato, and since then he has been active mainly under this name. In the summer of 2016, Kato retired from his job as a health professional to pursue content creation full-time, and he joined MURASH.

On March 12, 2022, he streamed his wedding reception on YouTube and Twitch to a peak audience of 463,646 simultaneous viewers on YouTube and 111,196 on Twitch. The total amount of money donated in the form of Super Chats was 200 million yen (approximately $1.8 million at the 2022 rate) on YouTube, achieving first place in the overall Super Chat ranking for the year.

He established the professional gaming team "Murash Gaming" in November. In January of the following year, members officially signed contracts for the Valorant and Super Smash Bros. divisions. As of 2024, the team is actively operating in three divisions, including Street Fighter 6.

On October 18, 2023, he announced that he would be opening Beauty Salon "CUT Jun" using the 13 million yen he earned from the payout from horse racing, and it opened in Tokyo on January 4 the following year.

He took part in the 2024 Kings World Cup as the chairperson of "Murash FC." Despite lacking prior soccer experience, he made the decision to enter the Kings League for the first time, representing Japan, after receiving a direct offer from Gerard Piqué

== Personal life ==
On 12 September 2024, Kato was photographed in the front row seats of Dodger Stadium in Los Angeles with a woman who was alleged to be the pornographic actress Ai Hongo. Kato admitted on a Twitch stream the next day that he went on a trip with Hongo to see Shohei Ohtani play, but explained that it was done with his wife's knowledge and permission while maintaining he did not have sexual relations with Hongo. Kato's wife Sachiko appeared on stream and corroborated the story, saying that she trusts Kato.

Hongo released a video on YouTube on September 15 admitting that she and Kato had been dating. She said Kato had told her he had divorced his wife, and so Hongo did not know that she was having an affair. Kato then confessed that he had been cheating, and he did it "because [he] wanted to". He and his wife had been living separately, but were not divorced at the time of the affair. On April 24, 2025, Kato announced that he and his wife had officially divorced, saying that it was because he has to take responsibility for living his life selfishly without regard of his family.
