= Michele Trombetta =

Italian footballer (born 1994)

Personal information
- Date of birth: 3 August 1994 (age 32)
- Place of birth: Sala Bolognese, Italy
- Height: 1.95 m (6 ft 5 in)
- Position: Forward

Team information
- Current team: Mestre
- Number: 9

Youth career
- 2011–2014: Modena

Senior career*
Years	Team	Apps	(Gls)
2011–2014	Modena	2	(0)
2014	Virtus Castelfranco	9	(0)
2014–2017	Progresso		
2017–2018	Portuense		
2018–2019	Sant'Agostino	32	(13)
2019–2020	Corticella	21	(12)
2020–2021	Piccardo Traversetolo		(9)
2021–2022	Cittadella Vis Modena		(14)
2022–2024	Corticella	57	(26)
2024	Giana Erminio	8	(1)
2024–2025	Forlì	14	(7)
2025–2026	Piacenza	17	(2)
2026	Forlì	13	(2)
2026–	Mestre	0	(0)
- * Club domestic league appearances and goals as of 6 August 2026

Michele Trombetta (born 3 August 1994) is an Italian footballer who plays as a forward for Italian Serie D club Mestre.

== Club career ==
Trombetta was a youth player of Modena. On 23 November 2011, he made his club debut in Coppa Italia against ChievoVerona. He then made his Serie B debut against Crotone. After various experiences with smaller teams such as Virtus Castelfranco, Progresso, Portuense, S. Agostino, Traversetolo and Vis Modena, he found stability in Corticella, where he arrives in 2022.

Playing in Serie D with Corticella, he scored 26 goals over two seasons. In May 2024, he was selected by the Italian Twitch streamer Tumblurr to be part of his team, the Stallions at seven-a-side football tournament 2024 Kings World Cup. On 26 May 2024, he made his Kings World Cup debut against Colombian team Medallo City. He scored the decisive goal that led Stallions into the next round. After being scoreless in the next game against Brazil's Furia FC, he scored a brace in the last-chance round game against Persas FC. In the round of 16, he missed a penalty as Stallions were knocked out of the tournament by eventual champions Porcinos FC.

After claiming media attention thanks to the competition, in summer 2024 he was linked with Serie C teams like Giana Erminio, SPAL and Carpi. So, on 7 July 2024, he joined Giana Erminio on a free transfer.

In December 2024, it was announced that Trombetta had been selected for Italy's squad in the 2025 Kings World Cup Nations, which was held in January 2025 and later on the same month he joined on a free transfer Serie D club Forlì.
