= Max Dombrowka =

German footballer

Personal information
- Date of birth: 24 March 1992 (age 34)
- Place of birth: Ingolstadt, Germany
- Height: 1.80 m (5 ft 11 in)
- Position: Defender

Team information
- Current team: FC Pipinsried
- Number: 8

Youth career
- –2003: SC Amicitia Munich
- 2003–2010: Bayern Munich

Senior career*
Years	Team	Apps	(Gls)
2010–2012	Bayern Munich II	49	(0)
2012–2015	Rot-Weiss Essen	70	(2)
2015–2021	SpVgg Unterhaching	182	(4)
2021–2023	SV Meppen	64	(2)
2023–2025	FC 08 Homburg	46	(0)
2025–	FC Pipinsried	32	(3)

International career
2011	Germany U19	2	(0)
- * Club domestic league appearances and goals as of 27 September 2026

Max Dombrowka (born 24 March 1992) is a German professional footballer who plays as a defender for FC Pipinsried.

== Career ==
Dombrowka joined Bayern Munich's youth team in 2003, and broke into the reserve squad during the 2010–11 season, making his debut in a 1–0 defeat against SV Sandhausen in September 2010. He made 49 appearances for Bayern II before joining Rot-Weiss Essen in July 2012. In 2015, he joined Regionalliga Bayern side SpVgg Unterhaching.
