= Francisco Estrada (footballer) =

Mexican footballer (born 1993)

Personal information
- Full name: Francisco Javier Estrada Aguirre
- Date of birth: 20 January 1993 (age 33)
- Place of birth: Ecatepec de Morelos, Mexico
- Height: 1.80 m (5 ft 11 in)
- Position: Midfielder

Senior career*
Years	Team	Apps	(Gls)
2008–2017	Atlante	66	(5)
2017	→ Oaxaca (loan)	3	(0)
2018–2019	Pioneros de Cancún	14	(1)
2019–2020	Inter Playa del Carmen	21	(0)
2020	Halcones de Zapopan	0	(0)
2021–2022	Cancún	16	(0)
- * Club domestic league appearances and goals as of 14 April 2022

Francisco Javier Estrada Aguirre (born 20 January 1993) is a Mexican professional footballer who plays as a midfielder.
