= Serhat Kot =

Turkish footballer (born 1997)

Personal information
- Date of birth: 12 August 1997 (age 29)
- Place of birth: Bielefeld, Germany
- Height: 1.70 m (5 ft 7 in)
- Position: Midfielder

Team information
- Current team: 52 Orduspor
- Number: 6

Youth career
- 2002–2006: VfL Schildesche
- 2006–2009: VfL Theesen
- 2009–2014: Borussia Dortmund
- 2014–2015: Schalke 04
- 2015–2016: Preußen Münster

Senior career*
Years	Team	Apps	(Gls)
2016–2017	Altay	3	(0)
2017	1. FC Nürnberg II	13	(0)
2017–2019	Fenerbahçe	1	(0)
2019–2020	MVV	17	(1)
2021	1922 Konyaspor	13	(0)
2021–2023	Turgutluspor	50	(4)
2023–2024	Adanaspor	6	(0)
2024–2025	Karacabey Bld	51	(3)
2025–2026	68 Aksaray Belediyespor	29	(4)
2026–	52 Orduspor	4	(0)

International career
2013	Turkey U16	2	(0)
- * Club domestic league appearances and goals as of 1 October 2026

Serhat Kot (born 12 August 1997) is a Turkish professional footballer who plays as a midfielder for TFF 2. Lig club 52 Orduspor.

== Club career ==
A youth product of Borussia Dortmund, Kot begun his senior career with the Turkish club Altay S.K., before moving back to Germany with 1. FC Nürnberg II. He joined Fenerbahçe in the summer of 2017, joining their youth side. Kot made his professional debut with Fenerbahçe in a 2–0 Süper Lig win over İstanbul Başakşehir on 11 February 2018.

On 24 August 2019, Kot signed a one-year contract with Dutch club MVV Maastricht competing in the second-tier Eerste Divisie. He left the club when his contract expired in July 2020.

== International career ==
Kot represented the Turkey U16s at the 2013 Montaigu Tournament.
