= Alp Arda =

Turkish footballer (born 1995)

Personal information
- Date of birth: 7 June 1995 (age 31)
- Place of birth: Fatih, Turkey
- Height: 1.92 m (6 ft 4 in)
- Position: Goalkeeper

Team information
- Current team: Erbaaspor
- Number: 1

Youth career
- 2005–2008: Batı Trakya Türklerispor
- 2008–2017: Galatasaray
- 2017: Esenyurt Acarspor
- 2017–2018: Yeşilköy
- 2018–2019: İstanbul Beylikdüzüspor
- 2019: Merzifonspor

Senior career*
Years	Team	Apps	(Gls)
2019–2020	Osmaniyespor	27	(0)
2020–2026	İstanbulspor	22	(0)
2021	→ Cizrespor (loan)	13	(0)
2021–2022	→ Isparta 32 Spor (loan)	31	(0)
2024–2025	→ Iğdır (loan)	1	(0)
2026–	Erbaaspor	0	(0)
- * Club domestic league appearances and goals as of 1 October 2026

Alp Arda (born 7 June 1995) is a Turkish professional footballer who plays as a goalkeeper for TFF 2. Lig club Erbaaspor.

== Career ==
Arda is a youth product of Batı Trakya Türklerispor, Galatasaray, Esenyurt Acarspor, Yeşilköy, İstanbul Beylikdüzüspor, and Merzifonspor. He began his senior career with Osmaniyespor in the TFF Third League in 2019. He transferred to İstanbulspor on 17 August 2020 on a 5-year contract. He joined Cizrespor on loan for the second half of the 2020–21 season. He then moved to Isparta 32 Spor on loan for the 2021–2022 season. ON 8 August 2022, he extended his contract with İstanbulspor until 2027. He made his senior and professional debut with İstanbulspor as in a 3–2 Süper Lig loss to MKE Ankaragücü on 8 April 2023. In his second professional start against Fenerbahçe, he was named "man of the match" in a 3–3 league tie.
