= Kings World Cup Clubs =

Seven-a-side football international competition

- Organiser(s): Kings League
- Founded: 2023
- Region: International
- Teams: 16
- Current champions: (Brazil) G3X FC (1st title)
- Most championships: (Spain) Porcinos FC (Spain) Los Troncos FC (Brazil) G3X FC (1 title each)
- 2026 Kings World Cup Clubs

The Kings World Cup Clubs (formerly known as Kings World Cup, renamed to distinguish it from the Kings World Cup Nations) is an international seven-a-side football tournament featuring teams from various leagues from the Kings League, plus wildcards from other future international versions. It effectively serves as the Kings League's equivalent to the FIFA Club World Cup.

== History ==
On 7 November 2023, a new tournament was announced, tentatively named the Kings League World Cup. It was announced as featuring 20 teams from the Kings League, with 10 from both Spain and the Americas, along with other countries. It was held in Mexico from 26 May to 8 June 2024.

=== 2024 ===
Following the announcement, it was confirmed that former Sweden striker Zlatan Ibrahimović would preside over the competition.

The Kings World Cup officially began on Sunday, 26 May 2024, with Saiyans FC beating Youniors FC 2–0 in the opening match. The tournament was played in its initial phase in Mexico City. The so-called 'Final Four' changed its location and was held at the Estadio BBVA in Monterrey, where Porcinos FC became the champion after defeating G3X FC 5–3 in the final.

=== 2025 ===
Before the start of the 2024–2025 season, in an introductory video for the campaign uploaded on 7 September 2024, the 2025 edition of the Kings World Cup, renamed to the Kings World Cup Clubs due to the announcement of Kings World Cup Nations, was announced to happen at the end of the season. Spain would send Porcinos FC, the defending champions of the competition, automatically, alongside four teams from Kings League Spain. They were to be joined by four teams from the Americas Kings League and teams from four then-unknown Kings Leagues, as well as "wildcard" teams from other countries, for a 32-team tournament. France would be announced as the hosts for the competition on 24 March 2025 during the Kings League France team introduction and draft.

On 31 March 2025, more information was known about the 2025 Kings World Cup Clubs. The official team allocations were as follows:

- Defending KWC champions (Porcinos FC)
- Kings League Spain (4 teams): Split champions (4th split champion Jijantes FC, and 5th split champion Ultimate Mostoles), and the 2 best non-qualified teams from aggregate season points (Los Troncos, and xBuyer Team).
- Kings League Américas (4 teams): Split champions (2nd split champion Olimpo United, 3rd split champion Los Chamos), and the 2 best non-qualified teams from aggregate season points (Persas FC, and Galacticos del Caribe).
- Kings League Italia (4 teams): 2025 Split 1 Top 4 (Champions TRM FC, runners-up FC Zeta, and playoff semi-finalists GEAR7 and Boomers).
- Kings League Brazil (4 teams): 2025 Split 1 Top 4 (Champions Furia FC, runners-up Dendele FC, and playoff semi-finalists Desimpedidos Goti and Fluxo).
- Kings League France (4 teams): 2025 Split 1 Top 4 (Champions Panam All Starz, runners-up KARASU, and playoff semi-finals Foot2Rue and Unit3d).
- Kings League Germany (3 teams): Top 2 from the "Road to Paris" qualifying tournament (Futbolistas Locos FC, and ERA Colonia) and G2 FC (invited by The League after The Tournament).
- Wildcards - 8 teams

=== 2026 ===
On 5 March 2026, a revised slot allocation was announced with the tournament scaling down from 32 clubs to 16, and not featuring any wildcard teams for the first time.

On 21 May 2026, it was officially announced that the 2026 edition would take place in Italy from 26 July to 1 August 2026. At the same time, an additional slot was granted to the host nation and awarded to Stallions, while the final remaining slot was allocated to FWZ as the finalists of the 2025 Kings Cup MENA, joining DR7 who had already qualified.

The official team allocations were as follows:

- Title holders: Los Troncos FC
- Winners of Kings Cup Europe (Porcinos FC), Kings Cup America (Furia FC) and Kings Cup MENA (DR7)
- Kings League Spain: Regular phase winners (Ultimate Móstoles), Regular phase runners-up (La Capital)
- Kings League Italy: Split champions (Alpak), Regular phase winners (Underdogs FC), Host nation slot / 3rd Regular phase (Stallions)
- Kings League Mexico: Split champions (Aniquiladores), Regular phase winners (Atlético Parceros FC)
- Kings League Brazil: Regular phase winners (Desimpain), Regular phase runners-up (G3X FC)
- Kings League MENA: Kings Cup MENA runners-up (FWZ)
- Kings League France: Split champions (Karasu)
- Kings League Germany: Split champions (No Rules FC)

== Format ==
The Kings World Cup Clubs includes features of a Swiss-system tournament.

First stage

- In the first round, the 32 teams each play one match, with the pairings decided by a random draw, with no restrictions based on nation coincidence.
- All teams advance to the second round, with the teams that won their first-round match going to a 'winner bracket' and the teams that lost going to a 'loser bracket'.
- The teams of the 'winner bracket' that win their second round match will immediately qualify for the knockout stage, while the losing teams will face the winning teams from the 'loser bracket' in a last-chance round. The winners of the last-chance round will join the 'winner bracket' second-round winners in the knockout stage.

Knockout Stage

- The knockout phase will then consist of a round of 16, quarterfinals, semifinals and a final.

== Results ==
Year	Host	Final Match			No. of Teams
Year	Host	Champions	Score	Runners-up	No. of Teams
2024	Mexico	(Spain) Porcinos FC	5–3	(Brazil) G3X FC	32
2025	France	(Spain) Los Troncos FC	6–3	(Spain) Porcinos FC	32
2026	Italy	(Brazil) G3X FC	9–5	(Italy) Alpak FC	16

=== Performance by club ===
Team	Titles	Runners-up	Editions won	Editions runner-up
(Spain) Porcinos FC	1	1	2024	2025
(Brazil) G3X FC	1	1	2026	2024
(Spain) Los Troncos FC	1	0	2025	
(Italy) Alpak FC	0	1		2026

== See also ==
- Kings League
- Kings World Cup Nations
