= Vlad Marin =

Romanian footballer (born 1995)

Personal information
- Full name: Vlăduț Nicolae Marin
- Date of birth: 15 May 1995 (age 31)
- Place of birth: Râmnicu Vâlcea, Romania
- Height: 1.79 m (5 ft 10 in)
- Position: Left-back

Team information
- Current team: Alba Calcio
- Number: 33

Youth career
- –2012: Lazio
- 2012–2013: Manchester City
- 2013–2014: Juventus
- 2014: → Roma (youth loan)

Senior career*
Years	Team	Apps	(Gls)
2014–2018	Juventus	0	(0)
2014–2015	→ Messina (loan)	1	(0)
2015–2016	→ Rimini (loan)	9	(0)
2016–2018	→ FCV Dender EH (loan)	10	(0)
2020–2024	Fossano		

International career^{‡}
2013–2014	Romania U19	5	(0)
- * Club domestic league appearances and goals as of 18 May 2023 ‡ National team caps and goals as of 20:04, 21 November 2017 (UTC)

Vlăduț Nicolae Marin (born 15 May 1995) is a Romanian footballer who plays as a left-back for Alba Calcio.

== Club career ==
Marin began his career in the academy of Italian side Lazio, where head coach Simone Inzaghi promoted him from under-17 level to Primavera, where he played alongside players older than him due to his high potential. Due to this experience, he was scouted and signed by English Premier League side Manchester City in 2012. Following the move, Lazio complained that Marin had been tapped up, with his agent, Dario Canovi, stating that the club should have asked themselves why Marin chose to leave. His spell with Manchester City lasted for one season before a return to Italy with Juventus.

In December 2020, after over a year without a club, he signed for Serie D side Fossano. He renewed his contract ahead of the 2022–23 season.

== International career ==
Having not received a call-up to the Romanian national youth teams, Marin stated that he was "still Italian" in an August 2012 interview with Sport.ro. The following year, he was called up to represent Romania at under-19 level, and went on to make five appearances.

== Career statistics ==
=== Club ===
As of 18 May 2023

Appearances and goals by club, season and competition
Club	Season	League			Cup		Other		Total	
Club	Season	Division	Apps	Goals	Apps	Goals	Apps	Goals	Apps	Goals
Messina (loan)	2014–15	Lega Pro	1	0	0	0	1 (Note: Appearances in the Coppa Italia Lega Pro)	0	2	0
Rimini (loan)	2015–16	Lega Pro	9	0	0	0	0	0	9	0
FCV Dender EH (loan)	2016–17	Belgian First Amateur Division	10	0	0	0	0	0	10	0
Cuneo	2018–19	Serie C	28	0	0	0	0	0	28	0
Fossano	2020–21	Serie D	2	0	0	0	0	0	2	0
Fossano	2021–22	Serie D	7	0	0	0	1 (Note: Appearances in the Serie D playout)	0	8	0
Fossano	2022–23	Serie D	19	0	0	0	2 (Note: Appearances in the Coppa Italia Serie D)	0	21	0
Fossano	Total		28	0	0	0	3	0	31	0
Career total			76	0	0	0	4	0	80	0
