= 2023–24 Queens League =

Queens League
- Season: 2023/24
- Dates: 6 May – 15 July 2023 (Split 1 regular season); 22 – 29 July 2023 (Split 1 playoffs); 9 September – 7 October 2023 (Queens Cup group stage); 9 – 14 October 2023 (Queens Cup knockout stage); 27 January – 6 April 2024 (Split 2 regular season); 14–20 April 2024 (Split 2 playoffs)
- Champions: Split 1: PIO FC (1st title); Queens Cup: Aniquiladoras FC (1st title); Split 2: xBuyer Team (1st title)
- Matches: 36
- Goals: 163 (4.53 per match)
- Top goalscorer: Clara Carmona (15 goals)
- Biggest home win: 1K FC 6–3 Las Troncas FC (27 May 2023)
- Biggest away win: Jijantas FC 0–4 Ultimate Móstoles (6 May 2023)
- Highest scoring: xBuyer Team 8–5 PIO FC (26 June 2023)
- Longest unbeaten run: Porcinas FC (4 matches)
- Longest winless run: 1K FC; Saiyans FC (3 matches)
- All statistics correct as of 20 April 2024.

The 2023/24 Queens League is the inaugural season of the Queens League Oysho, a seven-a-side women's football league based in Barcelona. Its first split began on 6 May 2023.

== Team organisation ==
Team	Manager	Chairperson
1K FC	(Spain) Elba de Vega	(Spain) Maite Carrillo (Mayichi)
Aniquiladoras FC	(Spain) Marta Sánchez	(Spain) Esperanza Borrás (Espe)
El Barrio	(Spain) Micky Ollé	(Spain) Adri Contreras
Jijantas FC	(Spain) Óscar Cobacho	(Spain) Gerard Romero and Lisbeth Cid^{1}
Kunitas	(Spain) Ari Font	(Argentina) Jo Valicenti^{2}
Las Troncas FC	(Spain) Èric Bartra (caretaker)	(Spain) Violeta G
PIO FC	(Spain) Flor de Luna Pila	(Mexico) Samantha Rivera (Rivers)
Porcinas FC	(Spain) Rubén Casado	(Spain) Gemma Gallardo (Gemita)
Rayo de Barcelona	(Spain) Rubén Rodríguez	(Andorra) Martí Miràs (Spursito)
Saiyans FC	(Andorra) Víctor Alfaya	(Spain) Anna Lluna (Lluna Clark)^{3}
Ultimate Móstoles	(Spain) Mireia Vera	(Spain) Noelia San Martín (Noe9977)
xBuyer Team	(Spain) Sergio Ruz	(Spain) Javier (xBuyer) and Eric Ruiz (MiniBuyer)

1. Romero and Cid took over from Paula Gonu after Week 1 of the Summer Split.
2. Valicenti took over from Morena Beltrán after the start of the 2024 Winter Split.
3. Lluna Clark took over from TheGrefg after the Summer Split.

=== Managerial changes ===
Team	Outgoing manager	Manner of departure	Date of vacancy	Position in table	Incoming manager	Date of appointment
Saiyans FC	(Spain) Jessica Rodríguez	Sacked	13 June 2023	10th	(Andorra) Víctor Alfaya	17 June 2023
Jijantas FC	(Spain) Manu Sánchez	Resigned	23 July 2023	Post-season	(Spain) Óscar Cobacho	3 August 2023
Las Troncas FC	(Spain) Manuel Lanzarote	Resigned	24 September 2023	6th - Group A	(Spain) Èric Bartra (caretaker)	30 September 2023

== Split 1 ==
The points system was announced on 24 April 2023:

- 3 points for a win during regular time.
- 2 points for a penalty shoot-out win.
- 1 point for a penalty shoout-out loss.
- 0 points for a loss during regular time.

=== Regular phase standings ===
Pos	Team	Pld	W	WSO	LSO	L	GF	GA	GD	Pts	Qualification
1	Porcinas FC	11	6	1	2	2	31	25	+6	22	Advance to playoff semifinals
2	Ultimate Móstoles	11	7	0	0	4	25	17	+8	21	Advance to playoff second round
3	El Barrio	11	5	2	1	3	23	17	+6	20	Advance to playoff second round
4	Rayo de Barcelona	11	5	1	2	3	33	25	+8	19	Advance to playoff second round
5	PIO FC	11	5	2	0	4	33	31	+2	19	Advance to playoff first round
6	Las Troncas FC	11	5	0	2	4	34	31	+3	17	Advance to playoff first round
7	Aniquiladoras FC	11	4	2	1	4	30	32	−2	17	Advance to playoff first round
8	xBuyer Team	11	4	0	3	4	32	30	+2	15	Advance to playoff first round
9	Jijantas FC	11	3	2	1	5	17	26	−9	14	Advance to playoff first round
10	Saiyans FC	11	3	1	1	6	20	29	−9	12	Advance to playoff first round
11	Kunitas	11	2	3	0	6	20	29	−9	12	
12	1K FC	11	2	1	2	6	21	27	−6	10	

Source: Queens League
Rules for classification: 1) Points; 2) Goal difference; 3) Head-to-head points; 4) Goals scored

_{H}\^{A}	1K	ANI	ELB	JIJ	KUN	LTR	PIO	POR	RBA	SYN	UMS	XBY
1K FC				(2) 2:2 (1)	(2) 1:1 (3)	6:3	2:5		0:1		2:3	0:3
Aniquiladoras FC	6:3		0:4	3:2					5:7		0:2	4:2
El Barrio	(2) 1:1 (1)				2:0		(2) 1:1 (3)		2:1			(3) 3:3 (2)
Jijantas FC			3:1					1:3		(3) 1:1 (1)	0:4
Kunitas		3:2		1:2		3:1	2:4			3:5
Las Troncas FC		(2) 2:2 (3)	2:3	4:0				(1) 2:2 (3)		2:3
PIO FC		1:2		4:2		4:5		1:4		4:2
Porcinas FC	2:1	(0) 4:4 (2)	1:0		(1) 2:2 (3)				2:5	3:2		7:4
Rayo de Barcelona				(3) 2:2 (4)	4:2	3:5	(2) 2:2 (4)				2:3	(3) 2:2 (1)
Saiyans FC	0:3	(3) 2:2 (2)	2:4						0:4		3:1
Ultimate Móstoles			3:2		4:1	1:3	1:2	3:1
xBuyer Team				1:2	(3) 2:2 (4)	4:5	8:5			2:0	1:0

=== Playoffs ===
The playoffs are slated to be held from 22 to 29 July 2023. The format is the same that was announced in April 2023 for the Kings League Summer Split.

First round 22 July — Cupra Arena
5	PIO FC	2
10	Saiyans FC	1
7	Aniquiladoras FC	2
8	xBuyer Team	5
6	Las Troncas FC	4
9	Jijantas FC	1

Second round 25 July ― Cupra Arena
4	Rayo de Barcelona	2
5	PIO FC	3
2	Ultimate Móstoles	1 (3)
8	xBuyer Team (p)	1 (4)
3	El Barrio	1 (1)
6	Las Troncas FC (p)	1 (3)

Semifinals; 29 July ― Metropolitano
1	Porcinas FC	2
5	PIO FC	3
8	xBuyer Team	3
6	Las Troncas FC	5

Final; 29 July ― Metropolitano
5	PIO FC	3
6	Las Troncas FC	1

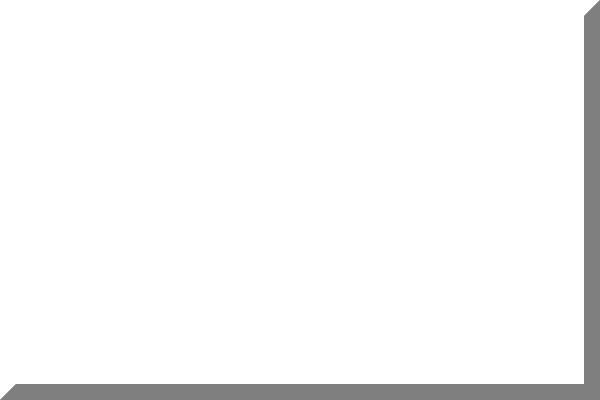
Champion
PIO FC
1st title

=== Guest players ===
Team	11th Player	12th Player
1K FC	Sara del Estal	Mimi; Miriam de Francisco
Aniquiladoras FC	Auxi Jiménez	Alicia Fuentes
El Barrio	Irene López	Willy Romero
Jijantas FC	Sandra Luzardo	Stefany Ferrer
Kunitas	Judith FF	Paula Blas
Las Troncas FC	Anna Armengol	Lucía Cuadra; Sara Serna
PIO FC	Berta Velasco	Noemí Rubio
Porcinas FC	Sara Mérida	Sandra Alberola; Melanie Serrano; Mari Paz Vilas
Rayo de Barcelona	Clara Carmona	Joanna Vega
Saiyans FC	María Sampalo	Ruth García
Ultimate Móstoles	Esther Solá	Evita
xBuyer Team		Paula Bolta

== Queens Cup (September–October 2023) ==
The 2023 Queens Cup is set to begin on 9 September 2023 and conclude on 14 October 2023.

=== Group stage ===
The groups were drawn during the Draft Day event on 4 September 2023.

Group A	Group B
Porcinas FC; El Barrio; PIO FC; Las Troncas FC; Aniquiladoras FC; Saiyans FC	Ultimate Móstoles; Rayo de Barcelona; xBuyer Team; Jijantas FC; Kunitas; 1K FC

==== Group A ====
Pos	Team	Pld	W	WSO	LSO	L	GF	GA	GD	Pts	Qualification
1	Saiyans FC	5	2	3	0	0	16	13	+3	12	Knockout stage
2	Aniquiladoras FC	5	2	1	0	2	14	15	−1	8	Knockout stage
3	PIO FC	5	2	0	1	2	15	9	+6	7	Knockout stage
4	El Barrio	5	2	0	1	2	16	16	0	7	Knockout stage
5	Porcinas FC	5	2	0	1	2	13	19	−6	7	
6	Las Troncas FC	5	1	0	1	3	13	15	−2	4	

Source: Queens League
Rules for classification: 1) Points; 2) Goal difference; 3) Head-to-head points; 4) Goals scored

9 September 2023
17:00 CEST

Porcinas FC	3–2	El Barrio
Vilas 20'; Hernández 25'; Martín 38' (pen.)		Serrano 39' (x2)

Cupra Arena, Barcelona
9 September 2023
19:00 CEST

Saiyans FC	3–3	Las Troncas FC
Corral 20+1'; Rubio 20+4'; Benítez 25'		González 15' (o.g.); Campos 17' (pen.), 34' (pen.); Pi (red card) 20+2'
Penalties
Benítez (penalty missed); Rubio (penalty missed); Corral (penalty scored); González (penalty scored)	2–0	(penalty missed) Granados; (penalty missed) Romoleroux; (penalty missed) Azdaou; (penalty missed) del Toro

Cupra Arena, Barcelona
9 September 2023
20:00 CEST

PIO FC	6–1	Aniquiladoras FC
Mérida 17' (pen.); Velasco 20+1', 21'; Serracanta 20+2', 36' (pen.); Verdaguer 22' (o.g.)		Ismael 18' (pen.)

Cupra Arena, Barcelona

16 September 2023
17:00 CEST

Saiyans FC	4–4	El Barrio
Benítez 6', 18' (pen.), 20'; González 17'; García (yellow card) 22'		Guerrero 9', 20'; Serrano 25' (pen.), 36'
Penalties
Corral (penalty scored); Benítez (penalty missed); Moyano (penalty scored); González (penalty scored); Rubio (penalty scored)	4–3	(penalty scored) Sanz; (penalty missed) Blas; (penalty scored) Guerrero; (penalty missed) Martínez; (penalty scored) Serrano

Cupra Arena, Barcelona
16 September 2023
19:00 CEST

Porcinas FC	0–6	PIO FC
		Aldea 2'; Mérida 16' (pen.); Serracanta 24', 38' (pen.); Zarza 40+2' (x2)

Cupra Arena, Barcelona
16 September 2023
21:00 CEST

Las Troncas FC	1–3	Aniquiladoras FC
Granados (yellow card) 15'; Mayoral 20'		Ismael 5' (pen.), 38' (pen.); López 20+1'

Cupra Arena, Barcelona

23 September 2023
18:00 CEST

El Barrio	5–2	Las Troncas FC
Guerrero 4'; Serrano 6' (pen.), 20', 20+1'; Chavero 19'		Romoleroux 20', 20'; Medina (yellow card) 24'

Cupra Arena, Barcelona
23 September 2023
20:00 CEST

PIO FC	0–0	Saiyans FC
Penalties
Mérida (penalty scored); Velasco (penalty scored); Aldea (penalty missed); Serracanta (penalty missed)	2–4	(penalty scored) Corral; (penalty scored) Rabassa; (penalty scored) Moyano; (penalty scored) González

Cupra Arena, Barcelona
23 September 2023
21:00 CEST

Porcinas FC	3–3	Aniquiladoras FC
Vilas 14', 29', 31' (pen.); Pimentel (red card) 19'		López 4' (pen.), 11' (pen.); Morote 20'
Penalties
Martín (penalty scored); Ronzero (penalty missed); Vilas (penalty scored); Hernández (penalty scored); Bladh (penalty missed); Guerra (penalty missed); Nieto (penalty missed)	3–4	(penalty scored) Morote; (penalty missed) Verdaguer; (penalty missed) Arévalo; (penalty scored) Garrote; (penalty scored) Ferrer; (penalty missed) Fernández; (penalty scored) Prat

Cupra Arena, Barcelona

30 September 2023
18:00 CEST

Porcinas FC	3–5	Saiyans FC
Vilas 9' (pen.) (yellow card) 40+1'; Nieto 20+1'; Ronzero 21'		González 7'; Moyano 9' (pen.); Benítez 14'; Ruiz 17'; Corral 33' (yellow card) 40+1'

Cupra Arena, Barcelona
30 September 2023
20:00 CEST

PIO FC	0–4	Las Troncas FC
		Camacho 11'; Campos 13' (pen.); Romoleroux 19'; Granados 22'

Cupra Arena, Barcelona
30 September 2023
21:00 CEST

Aniquiladoras FC	4–1	El Barrio
Sáez 19'; Ismael 20+1', 20+1' (yellow card) 30'; Garrote 22'		Chavero 19'

Cupra Arena, Barcelona

7 October 2023
17:00 CEST

Porcinas FC	4–3	Las Troncas FC
Vilas 12' (pen.) 39'; Hernández 18', 20+1'		Campos 12', 14' (pen.); Mayoral 25'

Cupra Arena, Barcelona
7 October 2023
19:00 CEST

El Barrio	4–3	PIO FC
Serrano 16' (pen.), 39' (x2); Ferreras 23'		Mérida 18' (pen.); Camúñez 19'; Velasco 29'

Cupra Arena, Barcelona
7 October 2023
21:00 CEST

Saiyans FC	4–3	Aniquiladoras FC
Corral 4'; Rabassa 6' (pen.); Moyano 10'; Benítez 20+5'		Ismael 6' (pen.); Verdaguer (yellow card) 9'; Fernández 40+1' (x2)

Cupra Arena, Barcelona

==== Group B ====
Pos	Team	Pld	W	WSO	LSO	L	GF	GA	GD	Pts	Qualification
1	1K FC	5	3	1	0	1	20	15	+5	11	Knockout stage
2	Kunitas	5	2	1	0	2	14	17	−3	8	Knockout stage
3	Rayo de Barcelona	5	1	2	1	1	14	17	−3	8	Knockout stage
4	xBuyer Team	5	2	0	1	2	15	14	+1	7	Knockout stage
5	Jijantas FC	5	2	0	1	2	12	11	+1	7	
6	Ultimate Móstoles	5	1	0	1	3	14	15	−1	4	

Source: Queens League
Rules for classification: 1) Points; 2) Goal difference; 3) Head-to-head points; 4) Goals scored

9 September 2023
16:00 CEST

Rayo de Barcelona	1–5	1K FC
González 5'; Carmona (yellow card) 34'		Villagrasa 1', 7', 24' del Estal 20'; Pueyo 38'

Cupra Arena, Barcelona
9 September 2023
18:00 CEST

Ultimate Móstoles	1–2	Jijantas FC
Mellado 20+2'		Luzardo 19'; Corbacho 20+1'

Cupra Arena, Barcelona
9 September 2023
21:00 CEST

xBuyer Team	1–3	Kunitas
Giró 8'		Pablos 2'; Alberola 16', (yellow card) 37'; Fernández 21'

Cupra Arena, Barcelona

16 September 2023
16:00 CEST

1K FC	3–2	Jijantas FC
Villagrasa 3'; Margalef 12'; Vilamala 19' del Estal (yellow card) 40+1'		Tan (yellow card) 13'; Gómez 40+2' (x2)

Cupra Arena, Barcelona
16 September 2023
18:00 CEST

Ultimate Móstoles	1–3	xBuyer Team
Mellado 18' (pen.)		Díez 18' (pen.), 38' (pen.); Pubill 20+2'

Cupra Arena, Barcelona
16 September 2023
20:00 CEST

Kunitas	2–2	Rayo de Barcelona
Cros 4'; Pablos 28'		Ferrari 10'; Barroso 18' (pen.); Carmona (yellow card) 26'
Penalties
Cros (penalty scored); Martínez (penalty scored); Peya (penalty missed); Alberola (penalty scored); Pablos (penalty scored)	4–3	(penalty scored) Carmona; (penalty scored) Vega; (penalty missed) Barroso; (penalty scored) París; (penalty missed) Casals

Cupra Arena, Barcelona

23 September 2023
16:00 CEST

xBuyer Team	4–2	Jijantas FC
Sanz 10'; Giró 19', 30'; Serrano 33'		Luzardo 18' (pen.); Corbacho 35' (pen.)

Cupra Arena, Barcelona
23 September 2023
17:00 CEST

Rayo de Barcelona	4–4	Ultimate Móstoles
Barroso 15' (pen.), 38' (pen.); Carmona 19', 20+2'		Pomares 1'; Mellado 4' (pen.), 20+1', 38' (pen.)
Penalties
Carmona (penalty missed); Vega (penalty scored); González (penalty scored); Casals (penalty scored); Hernández (penalty missed)	3–2	(penalty missed) Mellado; (penalty missed) Solà; (penalty scored) Rubio; (penalty scored) Pomares; (penalty missed) Farreras

Cupra Arena, Barcelona
23 September 2023
19:00 CEST

Kunitas	4–7	1K FC
A. Martínez 18' (pen.), 20+1'; Cerdán 19'; Cros 20'		del Estal 18' (pen.), 20+2'; Pueyo 26' (x2); Villagrasa 30'; P. Martínez (yellow card) 36'; Margalef (yellow card) 40+2'; Farreras 40+3' (x2)

Cupra Arena, Barcelona

30 September 2023
16:00 CEST

Rayo de Barcelona	3–3	Jijantas FC
Barroso 15' (pen.); Carmona 19', 20'		Luzardo 20', 33' (pen.); Pérez 20+1'
Penalties
Carmona (penalty scored); Vega (penalty scored); Ferrari (penalty scored); Barroso (penalty missed); Casals (penalty scored); París (penalty missed); González (penalty missed); Hernández (penalty scored)	5–4	(penalty scored) Luzardo; (penalty missed) Corbacho; (penalty scored) Gómez; (penalty scored) Quer; (penalty scored) Pérez; (penalty missed) López; (penalty missed) Juncà; (penalty missed) Fernández

Cupra Arena, Barcelona
30 September 2023
17:00 CEST

Ultimate Móstoles	4–5	Kunitas
Mellado 4'; Jiménez 6', 14'; Solà 27'		Cros 8' (pen.), 20', 20+2'; Cerdán 19', 35'

Cupra Arena, Barcelona
30 September 2023
19:00 CEST

xBuyer Team	4–4	1K FC
Serrano 14' (pen.); Fabra (red card) 20+2'; Díez (yellow card) 25'; Pubill 33'; Sanz 40+1' (x2)		Margalef 12' del Estal 13' (pen.); Farreras 18'; C. Martínez 31'
Penalties
Costa (penalty missed); Serrano (penalty scored); Pubill (penalty missed); Sanz (penalty missed)	1–3	(penalty scored) del Estal; (penalty missed) Navas; (penalty scored) C. Martínez; (penalty scored) Vilamala

Cupra Arena, Barcelona

7 October 2023
16:00 CEST

1K FC	1–4	Ultimate Móstoles
Martínez 4'		Mellado 14' (pen.), 35' (pen.); Martín 40' (x2)

Cupra Arena, Barcelona
7 October 2023
18:00 CEST

Kunitas	0–3	Jijantas FC
		Luzardo 8', 10' (pen.), 38' (pen.)

Cupra Arena, Barcelona
7 October 2023
20:00 CEST

Rayo de Barcelona	4–3	xBuyer Team
Carmona 21'; Barroso 32', 38' (pen.); Vega 40+1'		Costa 20'; Pubill 23', 31'

Cupra Arena, Barcelona

=== Knockout stage ===
The format for the knockout stage was unveiled on 18 September 2023.

First round
1A	Saiyans FC	4
1B	1K FC	3
3A	PIO FC (p)	2 (2)
3B	Rayo de Barcelona	2 (1)
2A	Aniquiladoras FC	3
4B	xBuyer Team	2
2B	Kunitas	0
4A	El Barrio	4

Quarterfinals
1B	1K FC	4 (0)
3A	PIO FC (p)	4 (2)
2A	Aniquiladoras FC (p)	3 (3)
4A	El Barrio	3 (0)

Semifinal
3A	PIO FC	0 (1)
2A	Aniquiladoras FC (p)	0 (2)

Final
1A	Saiyans FC	1
2A	Aniquiladoras FC	2

First round

9 October 2023
18:00 CEST

Kunitas	0–4	El Barrio
Cerdán (yellow card) 20+2'		Serrano 8' (pen.), 37' (pen.); Chavero 40+2' (x2)

Cupra Arena, Barcelona

9 October 2023
19:00 CEST

Saiyans FC	4–3	1K FC
González 8', 10'; Moyano 13' (pen.); Corral (yellow card) 20+2'; Rubio 33' (pen.)		del Estal 13' (pen.); Martínez 16'; Jiménez (yellow card) 25'; Margalef 31'

Cupra Arena, Barcelona

9 October 2023
20:00 CEST

Aniquiladoras FC	3–2	xBuyer Team
Ismael 6' (pen.), 30' (pen.); Fernández 29'; Gilabert (yellow card) 33'		Serrano 7' (pen.); Llop 21'

Cupra Arena, Barcelona

9 October 2023
21:00 CEST

PIO FC	2–2	Rayo de Barcelona
Mérida 18' (pen.); Velasco 29'		Barroso (yellow card) 15' (goal) 18' (pen.); Hernández 36'; Vega (yellow card) 38'
Penalties
Velasco (penalty missed); Mérida (penalty missed); Serracanta (penalty missed); Camúñez (penalty scored); Bartolomé (penalty missed); Griso (penalty missed); Aldea (penalty scored)	2–1	(penalty missed) Carmona; (penalty missed) Vega; (penalty missed) Hernández; (penalty scored) Ferrari; (penalty missed) Barroso; (penalty missed) González; (penalty missed) París

Cupra Arena, Barcelona

Quarterfinals

11 October 2023
19:00 CEST

Aniquiladoras FC	3–3	El Barrio
López 12', 20'; Ismael 14'		Serrano 20+1', 31'; Sanz 23' (pen.)
Penalties
Ismael (penalty scored); Morote (penalty scored); Fernández (penalty missed); López (penalty scored)	3–0	(penalty missed) Sanz; (penalty missed) Serrano; (penalty missed) Ferreras

Cupra Arena, Barcelona

11 October 2023
21:00 CEST

1K FC	4–4	PIO FC
del Estal 18' (pen.), 33' (pen.); Mallada 28'; Villagrasa 35'		Mérida 18' (pen.), 20'; Camúñez 20+1' (yellow card) 33'; Pou (yellow card) 26'; Aldea 38' (pen.)
Penalties
del Estal (penalty missed); Mallada (penalty missed); Martínez (penalty missed); Margalef (penalty missed)	0–2	(penalty missed) Serracanta; (penalty scored) Aldea; (penalty missed) Zarza; (penalty scored) Camúñez

Cupra Arena, Barcelona

Semifinal

14 October 2023
17:30 CEST

Aniquiladoras FC	0–0	PIO FC
Penalties
Ismael (penalty missed); Morote (penalty missed); Fernández (penalty scored); Ferrer (penalty missed); López (penalty missed); Verdaguer (penalty scored)	2–1	(penalty missed) Serracanta; (penalty missed) Aldea; (penalty scored) Bartolomé; (penalty missed) Romero; (penalty missed) Camúñez; (penalty missed) Yáñez

La Rosaleda, Málaga

Final

14 October 2023
20:00 CEST

Saiyans FC	1–2	Aniquiladoras FC
Corral 20+2'		Ferrer 13'; Sáez 20'

La Rosaleda, Málaga

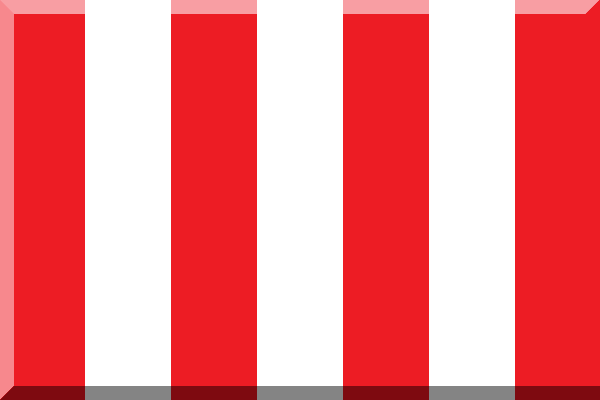
Champion
Aniquiladoras FC
1st title

== Split 2 ==
The 2024 Winter Split is still considered part of the 2023 season before the adoption of a new calendar model starting with the 2024–25 season. It is scheduled to begin on 27 January and conclude on 20 April 2024.

=== Regular phase standings ===
Pos	Team	Pld	W	WSO	LSO	L	GF	GA	GD	Pts	Qualification
1	Kunitas	11	8	1	1	1	50	27	+23	27	Advance to playoff semifinals
2	El Barrio	11	7	1	0	3	34	26	+8	23	Advance to playoff quarterfinals
3	Las Troncas FC	11	7	0	0	4	39	27	+12	21	Advance to playoff quarterfinals
4	xBuyer Team	11	6	0	1	4	35	37	−2	19	Advance to playoff quarterfinals
5	Saiyans FC	11	4	2	1	4	25	25	0	17	Advance to playoff quarterfinals
6	Porcinas FC	11	5	1	0	5	32	39	−7	17	Advance to playoff quarterfinals
7	Ultimate Móstoles	11	4	1	1	5	35	31	+4	15	Advance to playoff quarterfinals
8	PIO FC	11	4	0	1	6	25	33	−8	13	
9	Jijantas FC	11	4	0	1	6	22	30	−8	13	
10	1K FC	11	3	1	2	5	31	41	−10	13	
11	Rayo de Barcelona	11	2	2	0	7	34	38	−4	10	
12	Aniquiladoras FC	11	3	0	1	7	35	43	−8	4 (Note: Aniquiladoras FC were deducted six points due to a breach of the league's rules related to additional payments to player Sara Ismael, who also received a sixty-day ban effective 1 January.)	

Source: Queens League
Rules for classification: 1) Points; 2) Goal difference; 3) Goals scored

=== Playoffs ===
Quarterfinals; 14 April — Cupra Arena
4	xBuyer Team	2
5	Saiyans FC	0
2	El Barrio	1
7	Ultimate Móstoles	3
3	Las Troncas FC	5
6	Porcinas FC	2

Semifinals; 15 April — Cupra Arena
1	Kunitas	4 (1)
4	xBuyer Team (p)	4 (4)
7	Ultimate Móstoles	4
3	Las Troncas FC	1

Final; 20 April — WiZink Center
4	xBuyer Team	4
7	Ultimate Móstoles	1

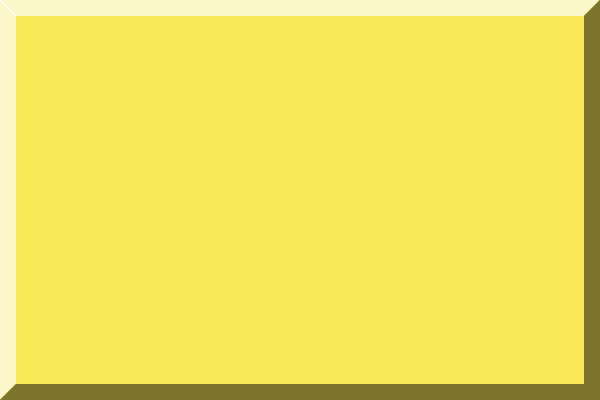
Champion
xBuyer Team
1st title
