= Queens League Spain =

Seven-a-side football league in Barcelona

- Founded: 24 February 2023; 2 years ago
- First season: 2023/24
- Country: Spain
- Province: Barcelona
- Number of clubs: 12
- Current champions: xBuyer Team (1st title) (2024 Winter Split)
- Broadcaster(s): Twitch; YouTube; TikTok; Cuatro
- Website: queensleague.pro
- Current: 2024/25 Queens League Spain

Queens League Spain (officially known as the Queens League Oysho due to sponsorship reasons) is a seven-a-side football league established in 2023 by Gerard Piqué, football personalities and internet streamers. It is based on the Kings League, launched by Piqué shortly before. The league rules include a tie-breaker penalty shoot-out, unlimited substitutions, and the implementation of secret weapons.

== History ==
Shortly after the inaugural season of the Kings League began, Oriol Querol, CEO of Kings League and Kosmos Holding director, announced the Queens League, a competition for women. From May 2023, Queens League matches will be played on Saturdays, ahead of Kings League matches on Sundays. Former Spain players like Priscila Borja and Willy offered themselves to join the Queens League. Ibai Llanos of Porcinos, was the first Kings League chairperson to confirm the creation of his women's team, Porcinas. Former player Borja Fernández offered to coach the team.

The Queens League had a launch event on 24 February 2023 at the Cupra Arena, with all of the Kings League teams taking part in the new tournament; some have changed branding for the women's team, and some have introduced more female streamers and popular figures as chairpersons.

While the Kings League's first season saw involvement from former professional footballers, the Queens League also includes current professionals, particularly in the organisation of teams: FC Barcelona Femení and Switzerland player Ana-Maria Crnogorčević is part of the staff of Saiyans FC; her club teammates Patricia Guijarro, Clàudia Pina, and Sandra Paños are all ambassadors of teams; as are Spain player Jennifer Hermoso and Chile player Christiane Endler. The number one draft pick was Zaragoza CFF, Egypt, and former Barcelona player Sara Ismael.

Mexican sports newspaper Récord wrote upon the announcement of the Queens League that it would be important in promoting gender equality in the world of video gaming. The Queens League teams are given the same conditions and pay as the Kings League. In May 2023, Pique and Spanish broadcasting company Mediaset announced that one match each day – the 8 pm games of both the Queens League and Kings League – would be broadcast on free-to-air television on channel Cuatro, which broadcasts most sports content. Highlights from other games and the related talkshows Chup Chup and After are also shown on Cuatro.

== Venue ==
The Queens League is held at the Cupra Arena in the Port of Barcelona area along with the Kings League.

Other venues around Spain, both outdoor and indoor, have since hosted Final Fours, with Mexico also once hosting a Queens League final:

Venue List
Venue	City	Autonomous Community	Country	Capacity	Use
Cupra Arena	Barcelona	Catalonia	Spain	Unknown	Regular venue
Civitas Metropolitano	Madrid	Madrid	Spain	70,460	2023 Split 1 Final Four
La Rosaleda	Málaga	Andalusia	Spain	30,044	2023 Queens Cup Final Four
Palau Sant Jordi	Barcelona	Catalonia	Spain	17,960	2023 Kingdom Cup Final Four
WiZink Center	Madrid	Madrid	Spain	17,453	2024 Split 2 Final Four
Heliodoro Rodríguez López	Santa Cruz de Tenerife	Canary Islands	Spain	22,824	2024 Split 3 Final
Estadio Luis "Pirata" Fuente^{1}	Veracruz (city)	Veracruz	Mexico	27,500	2025 Split 4 Final

^{1} Hosted as part of the "Kings and Queens League Americas Finals" with the Kings League and Queens League Americas also playing their 2025 Winter Split Finals there.

== Criticism ==
Before the league began, there was criticism from Porcinas' Ibai Llanos, who said that before the draft was held but after the tests, some of the candidates had been approached by other teams to sign them as 11th or 12th Players, effectively signing some of the best players for their teams without having to go through drafting.

== Team organisation ==
Team	Manager	Chairperson
1K FC	(Spain) Elba de Vega	(Spain) Maite Carrillo (Mayichi)
Aniquiladoras FC	(Spain) Marta Sánchez	(Mexico) Amairani Alonso (AmaBlitz)
El Barrio	(Spain) Micky Ollé	(Spain) Adri Contreras and (Mexico) Mercedes Roa
Jijantas FC	(Spain) Óscar Cobacho	(Spain) Gerard Romero and Lisbeth Cid
Kunitas	(Spain) Ari Font	(Argentina) Jo Valicenti
Las Troncas FC	(Spain) Èric Bartra (caretaker)	(Spain) Violeta G
PIO FC	(Spain) Flor de Luna Pila	(Mexico) Samantha Rivera (Rivers)
Porcinas FC	(Spain) Rubén Casado	(Spain) Gemma Gallardo (Gemita)
Rayo de Barcelona	(Spain) Rubén Rodríguez	(Andorra) Martí Miràs (Spursito)
Saiyans FC	(Andorra) Víctor Alfaya	(Spain) Totakeki
Ultimate Móstoles	(Spain) Mireia Vera	(Spain) Noelia San Martín (Noe9977)
xBuyer Team	(Spain) Sergio Ruz	(Spain) Javier (xBuyer) and Eric Ruiz (MiniBuyer)

== Season 1 (2023/24) ==
The 11th Players were announced before the draft on 16 April 2023. Sportswear company Oysho is the league's main sponsor and kit supplier. The first season is set to begin on 6 May 2023 and host its Final Four event on 29 July.

== Performance by team ==
Team	Titles	Runners-up	Splits won	Splits runner-up
Las Troncas FC	1	1	2024 Summer	2023 Summer
PIO FC	1	0	2023 Summer	
Aniquiladoras FC	1	0	2023 Cup	
xBuyer Team	1	0	2024 Winter	
Saiyans FC	0	1		2023 Cup
Ultimate Móstoles	0	1		2024 Winter
Jijantas FC	0	1		2024 Summer

== See also ==
- Queens League
- Media football
- Women's football in Spain
