= Sara Mérida =

Spanish footballer

Personal information
- Full name: Sara Mérida Pérez
- Date of birth: 8 April 1993 (age 33)
- Place of birth: Barcelona, Spain
- Height: 1.66 m (5 ft 5 in)
- Position: Midfielder

Youth career
- 2002–2004: Santa Eulalia

Senior career*
Years	Team	Apps	(Gls)
2004–2009	Vilanova		
2009	Espanyol B		
2009–2014	Espanyol	22	

International career
2010	Spain U17	10+	(3+)

Managerial career
- 2018–2022: Espanyol (assistant)
- 2022–2024: CE Europa B
- * Club domestic league appearances and goals

Sara Mérida Pérez (born 8 April 1993) is a Spanish retired footballer who played for RCD Espanyol. Debuting as a teenager with Espanyol, she won the Copa de la Reina twice and the Copa Catalunya once. As a youth international with Spain she won the U-17 Euro and came third at the U-17 World Cup in 2010. Despite youth success, she retired age 21 after tearing her anterior cruciate ligament four times, and became a physiotherapist and coach. From 2022 to 2024 she was the head coach of women's team CE Europa B, and was involved in the Queens League.

== Early and personal life ==
Sara Mérida Pérez was born in Barcelona on 8 April 1993. Having grown up playing football with her older brother, fellow player Fran Mérida, she joined Santa Eulalia – the boys' team Fran had first played at – when she was nine, staying until she was eleven. She has attributed her work ethic to advice Fran would give her. Between 2020 and 2022, Fran played for Espanyol's men's team while Sara was assistant coach of its women's team.

Mérida joined the women's team of Vilanova after she left Santa Eulalia, and attended school in Vilanova i la Geltrú; she continued studying there for the Baccalaureate, despite by then playing in Barcelona and having to commute.

On June 12, 2026. She is married to goalkeeper Sandra Paños.

== Club career ==
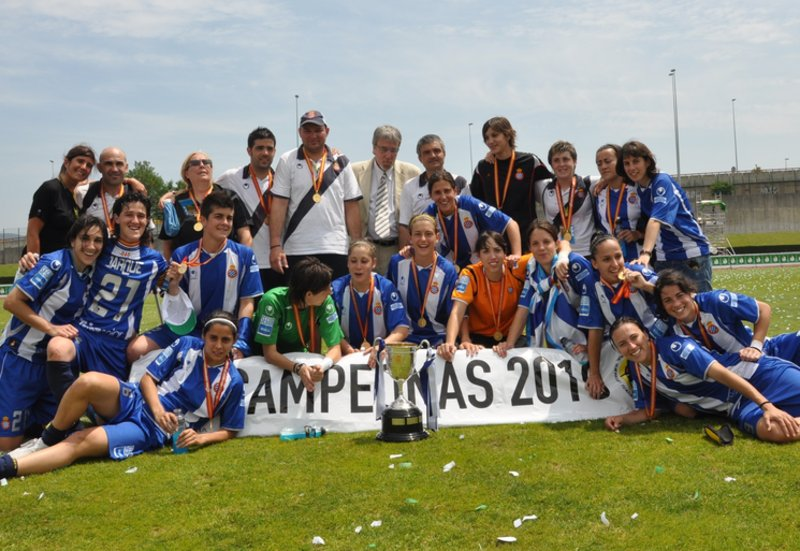
Mérida (front row, right of the player in green) with Espanyol in 2010

=== Espanyol, 2009–14 ===
Mérida joined RCD Espanyol as a teenager in 2009, a talented youth footballer tipped for a promising career. The club was a major power in Spanish women's football at the time. She initially signed for Espanyol's B team but was brought into the senior squad on a permanent basis after two months, playing her first Superliga matches when she was sixteen and saying it had been her dream to achieve this.

She started in both legs of the final of the 2009–10 Superliga Femenina season that Espanyol lost 1–2 on aggregate to Rayo Vallecano in May 2010. Espanyol then won the 2010 Copa de la Reina, with Mérida coming on for Kenti Robles in the final that they won 3–1 over the same opposition. She quickly became essential to the team's midfield and was their set-piece specialist. On 23 January 2011, Mérida suffered an anterior cruciate ligament injury in a game against Real Sociedad. She had surgery on 8 April 2011, her 18th birthday. She returned to training eight months after the injury, and expected to be present for the 2011–12 season, but tore her ACL again in a training session. During this season, two other Espanyol players also tore their ACLs; Mérida was cleared fit in March 2012 before tearing her ACL again later that month during a 3–1 victory over Sporting de Huelva. She was part of the squad that went on to win the 2012 Copa de la Reina.

The third tear led to her being out for a year, having not played a full match for over two years since her first injury. She continued at the club for the 2013–14 season, but could no longer be a consistent starter, looking to settle in the squad while it was going through a period of transition. She was included as part of the team for the Copa Catalunya in 2013; in the final in September they defeated the dominant Barcelona on penalties, with Mérida lifting the trophy with captain Sónia Matias. Mérida then tore her ACL for the fourth time and was forced to retire from playing football.

=== Queens League, 2023 ===
In 2023, the Queens League seven-a-side football league began, with Mérida joining as a guest player for the team Porcinas FC, the league seen as an opportunity to let her show her talent once again. She had also been involved in the organisation of the draft for the league, identifying which applicants were of a high enough level that they could be guest players who did not have to go through the draft process. Mérida captained Porcinas and played "at a spectacular level", with the team topping the table in the 2023 Queens League regular season before losing to PIO FC in the playoffs at the Metropolitano Stadium. She then joined PIO FC as a guest player in a "bombshell" move, starting the 2023 Queens Cup at a high level. She was named MVP of two Queens Cup matches, as well as MVP of the playoffs as she helped PIO reach the cup finals; she was unavailable to play in these finals after sustaining a knee injury in their match against 1K. Porcinas and PIO players paid tribute to her at their next match, and she said that the Queens League had helped heal old wounds about her football career. After retiring, she was one of the 20 finalists for the Corona de Oro best player award.

== Youth international career ==
Mérida played in the Catalonia football teams and was part of Spain's golden youth generation that won the 2010 UEFA U-17 Euro Championship and came third in the 2010 U-17 World Cup, considered their attacking midfield playmaker. In the under-17 Euro, Mérida scored twice in their 5–1 group victory against Denmark. In the final against Ireland, she played strongly and converted the first penalty in their shoot-out victory. In the under-17 World Cup, she scored against New Zealand from a free kick; having received a yellow card in the game, she was sat out in Spain's final group stage match against Venezuela. Her first ACL injury prevented her from playing in the 2011 UEFA U-19 Championship.

== Post-playing career ==
=== Physiotherapy ===
Having struggled to accept her injuries, Mérida was supported to "get [her] life back on track"; with extensive experience of physiotherapy, she decided to become a trainer. She studied at the Instituto Nacional de Educación Física (National Institute of Physical Education), though taking longer to complete the course due to her knee damage. Specialising in injury prevention and rehabilitation, she completed a Masters course from the Royal Spanish Football Federation. She started working as a freelance personal trainer in 2016, as well as being a physiotherapist, and in 2017 said that she wanted to focus on the period of re-adaptation to team training after an injury, something for which she felt there was little support.

Since 2018, she has been working as a physiotherapist for Espanyol. Though only intending to work with the women's first team, Mérida insisted on taking the case of Carla Sánchez from the youth team, a player who also suffered relapse after an ACL injury. When Sánchez returned to playing, she included Mérida's initial among others on her boots in tribute to how she had helped. She was also working with the Espanyol men's team by at least 2020.

In December 2023, she was one of several women's footballers, including Paños and Jenni Hermoso, honoured with the "Train your immunity" award by the Spanish Society for Immunology for their work promoting the benefits of physical activity in overall health.

=== Managerial career ===
Mérida is also involved with coaching. With her UEFA B Licence she was offered her first coaching role in the United States in 2017. She was assistant manager of Espanyol's women's team from 2018 to 2022, seeing the team promoted to the Primera Federación in 2022 after spending the 2021–22 season in the Segunda División. Having to leave as the club restructured to accommodate promotion, saying the decision was out of her hands, she was named the head coach of the first CE Europa women's youth team (Europa B) in 2022. Competing in senior leagues, Europa B won all of their games in their debut season and subsequently achieved promotion to the Catalan first division. In their second season, Europa B saw some more adversity but were still strong, again winning the league and achieving promotion to the Preferent, the top division of regional football. At the end of the 2023–24 season, Mérida left the team, having overseen two successive league titles and promotions; 52 victories and 4 losses; and a +378 overall goal difference.

After injury prevented her from continuing to play in the Queens League, she joined the staff of PIO FC as their assistant coach in December 2023.

== Managerial record ==
As head coach

Season	Team	Division	Tier	Pos	Pld	W	D	L	GF	GA	GD	Pts
2022–23	CE Europa B	2ª Catalana	7	1.º	24	24	0	0	235	8	+227	72
2023–24	CE Europa B	1ª Catalana	6	1.º	32	28	0	4	169	18	+151	84
Last update on 16 September 2024

== Honours ==
Espanyol

- Copa de la Reina: 2010, 2012
- Copa Catalunya: 2013

Spain under-17

- FIFA U-17 Women's World Cup: Bronze 2010
- UEFA Women's Under-17 Championship: 2010
