= Javier Arnáiz =

Spanish sports scientist

Francisco Javier Arnáiz Lastras is a Spanish sports scientist and football performance specialist who serves as the director of performance for AS Monaco FC. He was previously the head strength and conditioning coach for Real Madrid CF.

Arnáiz is also the founder of three sports tech companies: SoloPerformance, ThermoHuman, and Performance Creators. As an academic, he has published multiple papers. His research interests include thermography in athlete monitoring, load management, and return-to-play protocols.

== Early life and education ==
Born in Madrid, Spain, Arnáiz earned his Licentiate degree in exercise and sports sciences from the Polytechnic University of Madrid (UPM). He then earned two MSc degrees concurrently: one in research in exercise and sports sciences from UPM and another in football strength and conditioning, injury prevention, and rehabilitation from Pablo de Olavide University. Finally, Arnáiz earned his PhD in exercise and sport sciences from UPM in 2017; his doctoral thesis was titled "Monitoring the acute effects of recovery, training, and competition on football players’ skin temperature with infrared thermography".

== Career ==
Arnáiz was an assistant strength and conditioning coach for Spanish side Rayo Vallecano from 2011 to 2013, during which he interned with Brazilian side Botafogo FR in 2013. He was then hired as the head strength and conditioning coach for Getafe CF, where he worked from 2013 to 2015, before serving the same role at the Centro Nacional de Alto Rendimiento (CNAR) in Mexico City from 2016 to 2021. During his time at the CNAR, Arnáiz trained athletes in archery, artistic gymnastics, diving, fencing, judo, synchronized swimming, taekwondo, and triathlon. He was also the head strength and conditioning coach for the Mexico men's national basketball team for a short time, helping them win a bronze medal at the 2017 FIBA AmeriCup.

Arnáiz was hired at the NBA Academy Latin America in Mexico in 2019, initially working as a strength coach before being promoted to head of performance in 2021. He played a critical role in developing NBA draft picks Bennedict Mathurin and Olivier-Maxence Prosper. Arnáiz later worked for the Mexican Football Federation (FMF) as the director of sports science. In this role, he coordinated training, nutrition, medicine, physiotherapy, psychology, and sports science. He left the role in late October 2024 after more than two years with the FMF.

On 12 June 2025, Arnáiz was presented by Real Madrid as the club's new strength and conditioning coach under new manager Xabi Alonso. His sports tech company, ThermoHuman, was credited as a major factor in his hiring, due to a rash of injuries suffered by Real Madrid players in the preceding two seasons. Arnáiz was described by Fox Sports Mexico as a "guru in his field", while Récord called him "one of the most experienced sports scientists in the world". He quickly helped implement his ThermoHuman system into the team's training routine. Alonso and his staff (including Arnáiz) were let go in January 2026.

On 3 April 2026, Arnáiz was announced as the new director of performance for AS Monaco FC in Ligue 1. The club was similarly experiencing an "injury crisis".

Arnáiz has also been a member of the National Strength and Conditioning Association (NSCA) Spain Advisory Board since 2025.

=== Business career ===
Arnáiz has also founded several sports tech businesses. In 2009, he co-founded ThermoHuman, a company that uses infrared thermography to detect asymmetries in an athlete's skin temperature and identify injuries such as muscle overload, inflammation, or fatigue. In June 2020, Arnáiz founded SoloPerformance, a strength training prescription software for coaches, personal trainers, and physiotherapists. He had previously started a sports apparel company called SoloPerformance.mx.

== Personal life ==
Arnáiz married Mexican synchronized swimmer Nuria Diosdado at a vineyard in Jalisco in November 2021, following her participation in the 2020 Summer Olympics, in a wedding attended by Mexican Olympians such as Rommel Pacheco, María Espinoza, her synchronized swimming partner Joana Jiménez, and former partner Karem Achach. The couple met in 2017 and Arnáiz proposed to Diosdado on her birthday in 2020.

== Selected publications ==
- Reliability and reproducibility of skin temperature of overweight subjects by an Infrared Thermography software designed for human beings (2012)
- Aplicación práctica de la termografía infrarroja en el fútbol profesional (2014)
- Applications of Infrared Thermography in Sports. A Review (2015)
- Classification of factors influencing the use of infrared thermography in humans: A review (2015)
- Infrared Thermography as a Support Tool for Screening and Early Diagnosis in Emergencies (2015)
- Skin temperature response to unilateral training measured with infrared thermography (2017)
- Supplements of Carbohydrates Long During Exercise: Effects on the Electrolytes and Glucose (2018)
- Infrared Thermography Protocol on Reducing the Incidence of Soccer Injuries (2020)
- Isometric Midthigh-Pull Testing: Reliability and Correlation With Key Functional Capacities in Young Soccer Players (2024)
