= Archena =

- Municipality
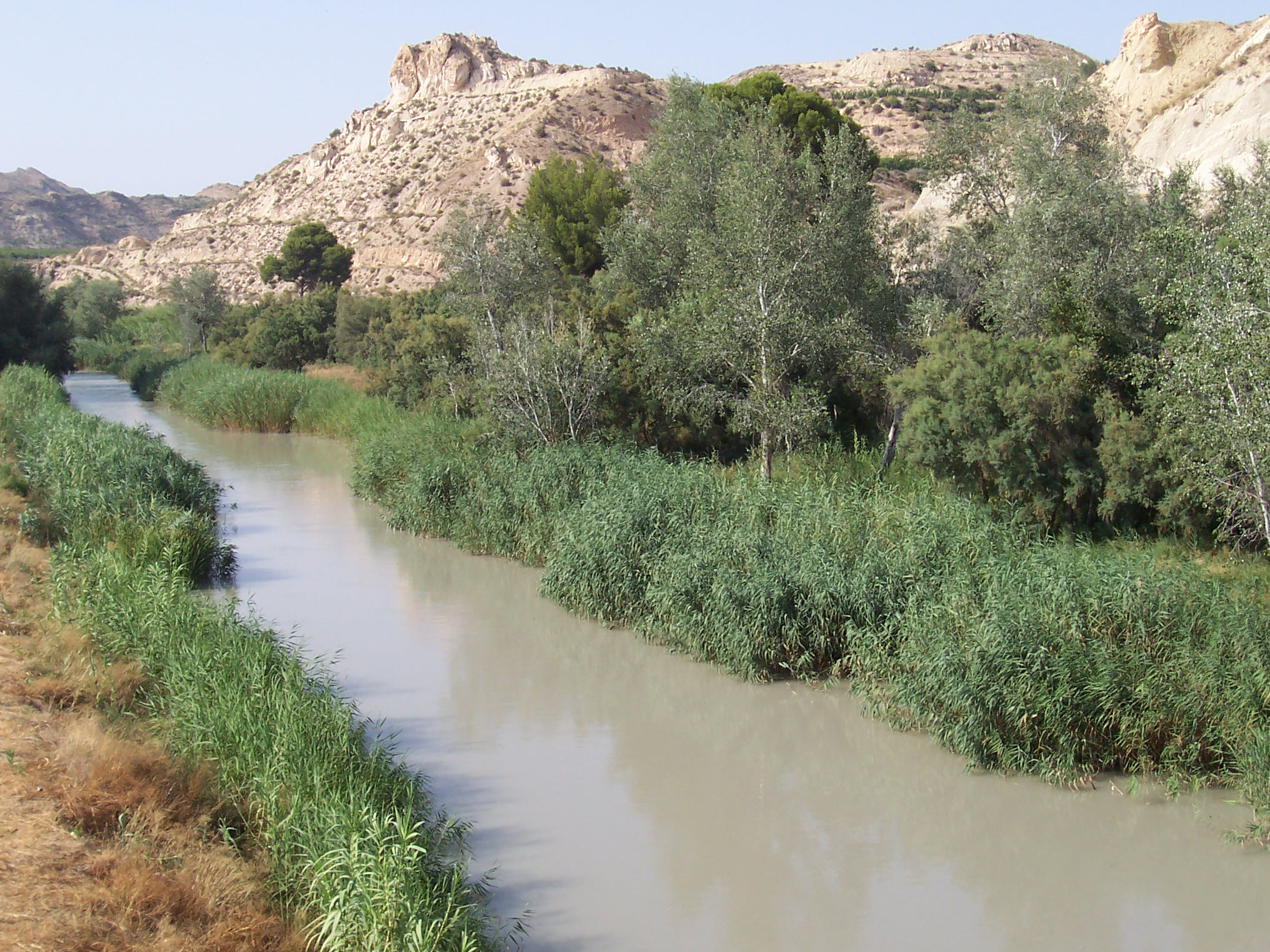
- The Segura river passing through Archena.

- Flag Coat of arms

- Location of the Municipality of Archena in Murcia.

- Location in Murcia Location in Spain
- Country: Spain
- A. community: Murcia
- Province: Murcia
- Comarca: Vega Media del Segura

Government
  - Alcalde (Mayor): Patricia Fernández López (PP)

Area
  - Total: 16.40 km^{2} (6.33 sq mi)
- Elevation: 102 m (335 ft)

Population (2025-01-01)
  - Total: 20,908
  - Density: 1,275/km^{2} (3,302/sq mi)
- Website: Official website

Archena is a municipality in the Region of Murcia, Spain, located in its northeastern part. It has a population of 20,976 (2024) and covers an area of 16.5 km^{2} (6.4 sq mi). The municipality lies 24 km (15 mi) from the regional capital, Murcia.

Archena is known for its hot spring spa, which dates back to Roman times. The spa complex includes three hotels, and additional Roman ruins were discovered at the site during recent development works.

== Etymology ==
The name "Archena" is associated with the Indo-European root for "water," which appears in toponyms such as Arga, Erga, and Arganzuela, and, within the Region of Murcia, in names such as the Argos River, Archena, and Archivel. Another proposed origin suggests that "Archena" derives from the Latin arxila, meaning "clay," which later evolved into its current form.

== History ==
=== Roman period ===
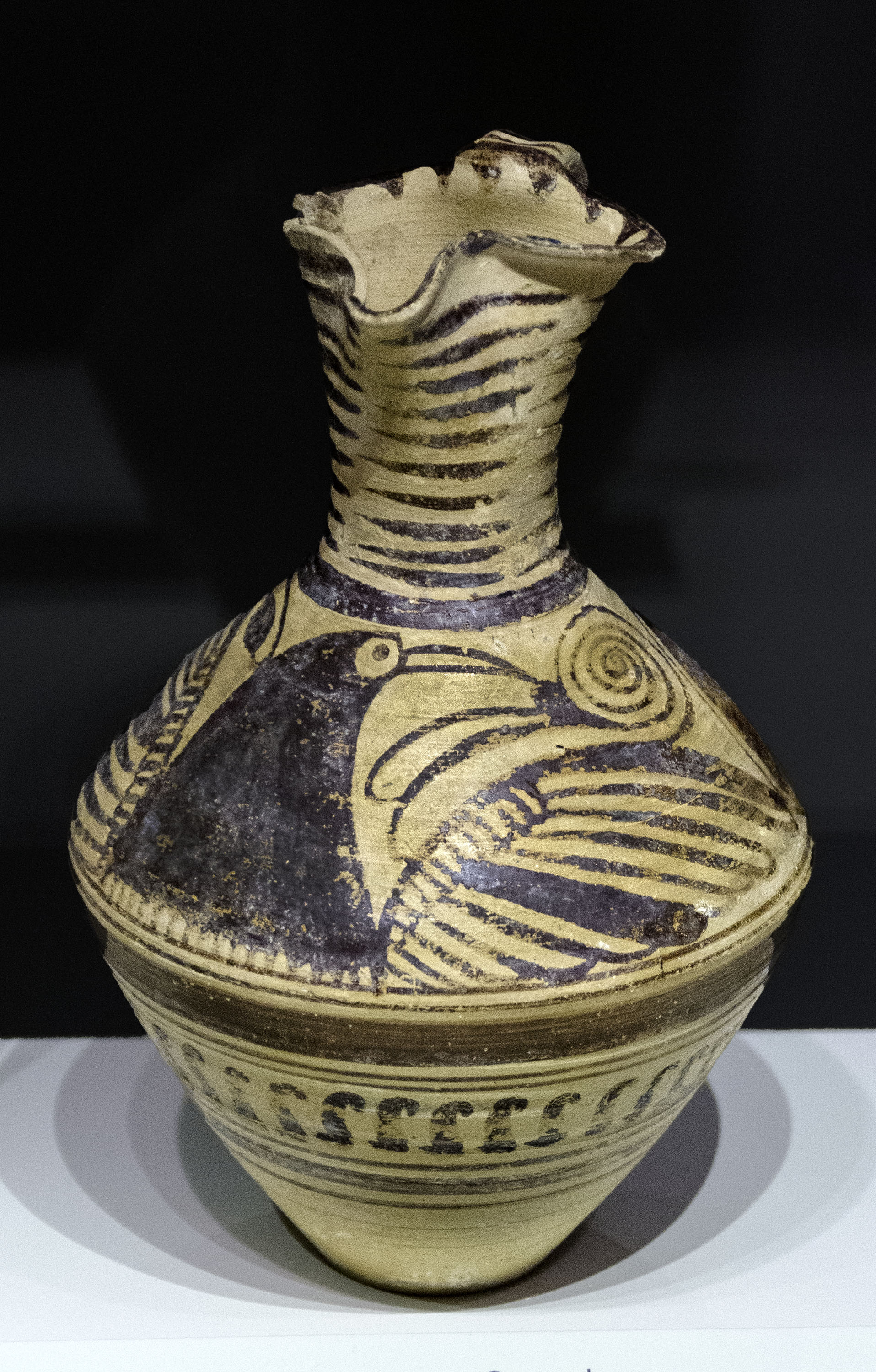
Iberian jar found in Archena

Although the settlement of Archena dates back to the Bronze Age, it was during the Roman period (1st–2nd centuries CE) that the town was established. This is evidenced by the archaeological remains of the thermal baths at Archena's spa. Around the site, the Romans built temples, lodges, and roads that connected the town with other parts of Hispania.

=== 17th century ===
Following the conquest of the Nasrid Emirate of Granada by the Catholic Monarchs in 1492, the Reconquista of the Iberian Peninsula was completed. Like much of the Kingdom of Murcia, Archena experienced a period of crisis in the 17th century. The century initially saw demographic growth and an expansion of cultivated land, with rice, maize, oil, and barley as the main products. However, a sharp population decline followed, aggravated by floods, droughts, locust plagues, earthquakes, and outbreaks of disease.

=== 18th century ===
The 18th century was generally a period of stability and economic growth in Spain, particularly in the Region of Murcia. The Ricote Valley and Archena experienced significant population increases.

The town, however, was negatively affected by the stationing of French troops, which placed an economic burden on the community. Despite this, the Enlightenment era marked the beginning of a steady demographic increase that continued into modern times.

=== 19th century ===
During the Peninsular War, the Archena spa (balneario) suffered extensive damage. The century was also marked by political instability and civil conflict. With the triumph of liberalism came the abolition of the Ancien Régime. The underlying social and political tensions of the Restoration period re-emerged in the early 20th century and culminated in the Spanish Civil War.

=== 20th century ===
Archena benefited from the establishment of a small sanatorium founded by Dr. Mario Spreáfico, who provided free medical care to the poor. The town was also the birthplace of Vicente Medina, a poet noted for his depictions of rural life.

The local economy prospered through trade, agriculture, and industry. In the early decades of the century, the "Molinos del Río" factory was founded, and apricots became the main agricultural product, alongside citrus fruits. Remnants of this industrial activity, such as factory chimneys, remain visible today.

==== Spanish Civil War ====
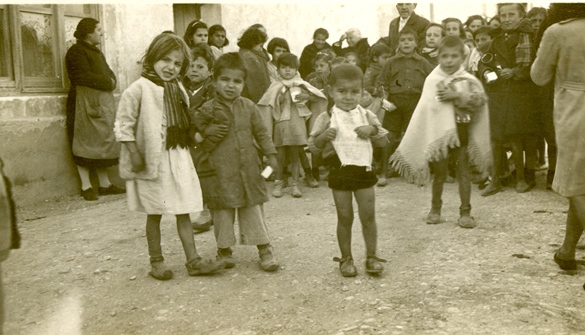
Children in Archena during the Spanish Civil War

During the Spanish Civil War, two military facilities were established in Archena: a Soviet-supported air base and a police and tank training school located in the spa complex, which also housed a military hospital.

The military command occupied the Miguel Medina school. Archena was not directly attacked but suffered the economic and social hardships of the postwar years. Agricultural production was reduced to subsistence levels, and famine and wage reductions were widespread.

Repression in the aftermath of the war included executions, persecution of Republican supporters, and imprisonment. In April 1939, the municipal officials were removed from office.

==== Second half of the century ====
After the war, the "Virgen de la Salud" and "Corpus Christi" were declared patron saints of Archena. By the 1930s, the population was 7,771, despite ongoing emigration to France and Barcelona, which continued until the 1980s, when economic prosperity encouraged return migration. From then on, Archena's population began to grow.

On 1 September 1963, an ammunition depot exploded about one kilometre from the town. No fatalities or injuries were reported, and the event is still commemorated locally.

The Spanish transition to democracy following the death of Francisco Franco in 1975 brought new schools, health facilities, and cultural and sports infrastructure.

=== 21st century ===
In 2001, archaeological excavations uncovered a Copper Age cave (c. 2300 BC) used by a community of 23 people.

On 11 September 2012, the 550th anniversary of Archena's municipal charter was celebrated. The charter, signed on 11 September 1462 by the Order of Saint John of Jerusalem and local villagers, established Archena's independence as a municipality with its first local government and mayor.

The Corpus Christi–La Purísima church was built in 2001, promoted by priest Cristóbal Guerrero Ros, who raised funds for its construction. He was named "adopted son" of the town on 31 May 2001 and honoured with a tribute in 2010.

Excavations linked to new construction at the spa have revealed Roman columns, ruins of buildings, and thermal galleries. A museum has been established to preserve and display these finds.

== Geography ==
Archena is located 24 km from the city of Murcia. The municipality covers an area of 16.5 km^{2}, most of which is irrigated farmland. It is one of the towns of the Ricote Valley. The Segura River runs through 7 km of the municipal territory and forms its main geographical axis.

The terrain is slightly undulating, with two prominent elevations: the Ope hill in the north, and the Sierra de la Serrata.

=== Climate ===
Archena has a hot semi-arid climate (BSh on the Köppen climate classification) bordering on a hot desert climate (BWh). As in most of the Region of Murcia, rainfall is scarce, averaging less than 300 mm annually. Most precipitation falls in spring and autumn, although amounts vary considerably between years.

The highest recorded temperature was 45.8 °C (114.4 °F) on 15 August 2021, while the lowest was −1.3 °C (29.7 °F) on 17 December 2010. Winter temperatures rarely fall below 0 °C (32 °F), while summer temperatures above 40 °C (104 °F) are common.

Climate data for Archena (2008-2025), extremes (2008-present)
Month	Jan	Feb	Mar	Apr	May	Jun	Jul	Aug	Sep	Oct	Nov	Dec	Year
Record high °C (°F)	28.8 (83.8)	28.7 (83.7)	33.5 (92.3)	36.2 (97.2)	41.2 (106.2)	41.9 (107.4)	45.3 (113.5)	45.8 (114.4)	43.1 (109.6)	35.3 (95.5)	30.6 (87.1)	29.5 (85.1)	45.8 (114.4)
Mean daily maximum °C (°F)	17.1 (62.8)	18.4 (65.1)	20.8 (69.4)	23.7 (74.7)	27.7 (81.9)	32.4 (90.3)	35.6 (96.1)	35.5 (95.9)	31.1 (88.0)	26.7 (80.1)	20.6 (69.1)	17.6 (63.7)	25.6 (78.1)
Daily mean °C (°F)	12.2 (54.0)	13.1 (55.6)	15.1 (59.2)	17.6 (63.7)	21.0 (69.8)	25.3 (77.5)	28.5 (83.3)	28.6 (83.5)	25.0 (77.0)	20.9 (69.6)	15.7 (60.3)	12.9 (55.2)	19.7 (67.4)
Mean daily minimum °C (°F)	7.2 (45.0)	7.7 (45.9)	9.3 (48.7)	11.4 (52.5)	14.3 (57.7)	18.2 (64.8)	21.3 (70.3)	21.7 (71.1)	18.8 (65.8)	15.1 (59.2)	10.9 (51.6)	8.1 (46.6)	13.7 (56.6)
Record low °C (°F)	−1.2 (29.8)	−1.2 (29.8)	0.1 (32.2)	5.3 (41.5)	6.2 (43.2)	11.8 (53.2)	15.7 (60.3)	16.3 (61.3)	12.2 (54.0)	5.7 (42.3)	2.4 (36.3)	−1.3 (29.7)	−1.3 (29.7)
Average precipitation mm (inches)	17.4 (0.69)	8.6 (0.34)	43.1 (1.70)	26.2 (1.03)	23.4 (0.92)	19.9 (0.78)	3.8 (0.15)	10.8 (0.43)	51.7 (2.04)	19.0 (0.75)	28.0 (1.10)	25.9 (1.02)	277.8 (10.95)
Source: Agencia Estatal de Meteorologia (AEMET OpenData)

=== Surroundings ===
Archena is considered the main town in the Ricote Valley. Other municipalities in the valley include:

- Ulea — covers 42.5 km^{2} and has a population of 913.
- Villanueva del Río Segura — covers 13.18 km^{2} with a population of 2,650.
- Ojós — covers 45.28 km^{2} and has a population of 504.

=== Neighbourhoods ===
==== Barrio de la Providencia ====
This neighbourhood, the second most populous after La Algaida, dates back to the early 20th century, when it was known as Camino de la Paira. The Duque de Huete football field was built there, and the area was later urbanised on its site. Because of this, it is colloquially referred to as "el fútbol" ("the football").

==== El Hurtado ====
This neighbourhood developed around a small settlement founded by entrepreneurs. Its name derives from the Hurtado family, who owned much of the land.

==== Las Arboledas ====
Las Arboledas (Spanish for "the groves") is a small neighbourhood whose patron saint is the Virgin of Lourdes. Its festivities are celebrated in honour of Saint James.

==== El Otro Lao ====
This neighbourhood ("the other side") dates to the late 19th century. The Spreáfico family played a prominent role in its development. The Castle of Don Mario is located in this area.

==== Los Baños ====
Los Baños ("the baths") is one of Archena's most historic districts. Today it is integrated into the urban area and contains a hotel complex that manages the thermal springs and offers health and wellness services.

==== La Algaida ====
La Algaida is the largest population centre outside the town itself. Its patron saint is Our Lady of the Rosary. In 1900 it briefly gained attention due to claims that a local woman known as "La Quica" experienced apparitions of the Virgin.

==== Torre del Junco ====
This district, closely linked to La Algaida, has traditionally been recognised for its fertile croplands.

=== Infrastructure ===
==== Streets ====
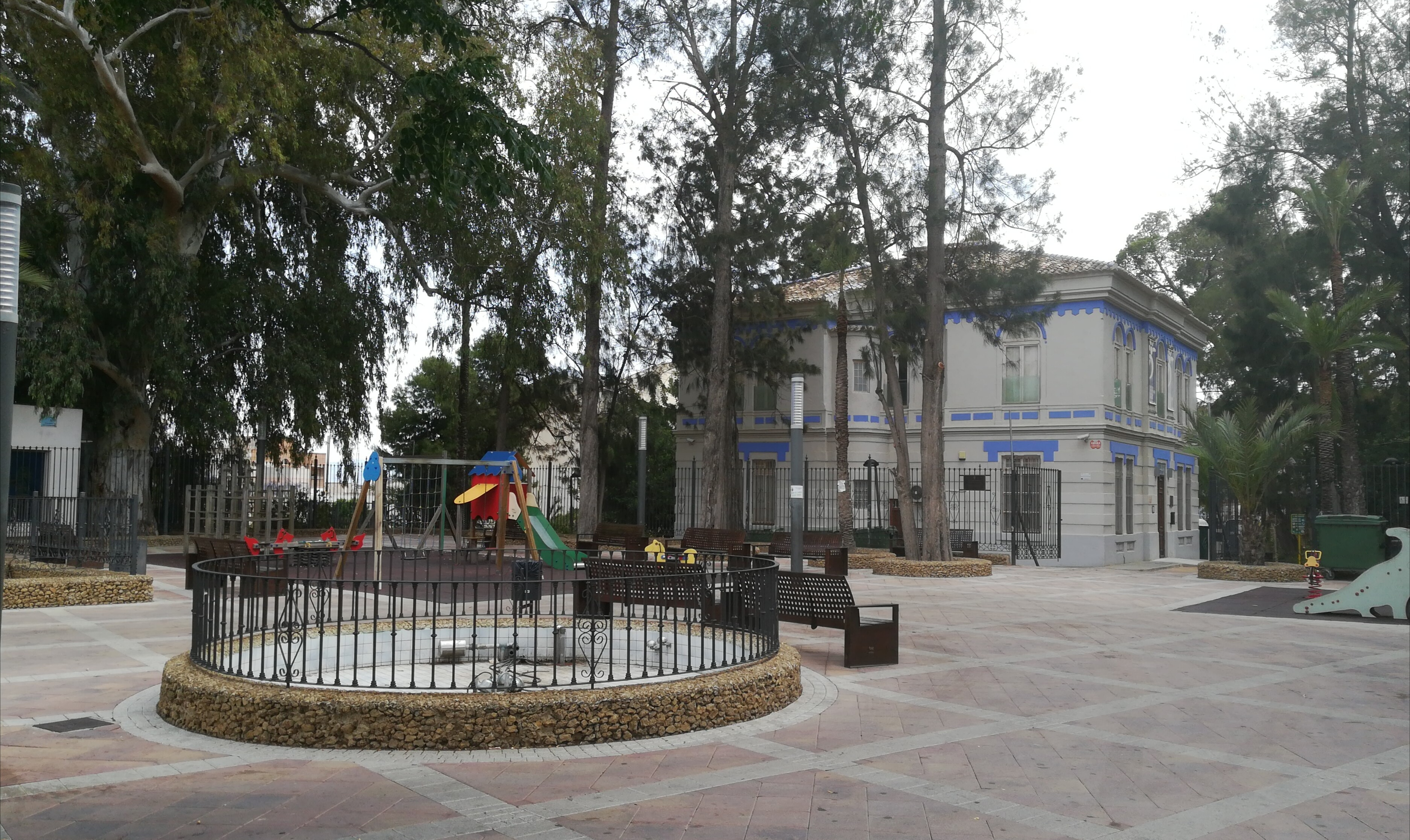
Plaza 1 de Mayo

Notable streets in Archena include Ramón y Cajal Street, which is lined with shops; Primero de Mayo Avenue; Copenhague Street, where the spa is located and which is commonly used for running; and Noria Street, the site of the Plaza de Abastos market.

==== Roads ====
Archena is accessible via the A-7, A-30, RM-533, RM-554, and N-301. Local roads link the town with neighbouring municipalities: MU-533 connects Archena with Ceutí; RM-530 with Mula; RM-522 with Ojós; RM-533 with Alguazas; and RM-544 with the A-30, providing a direct connection to Murcia.

==== Transport ====
Archena has a bus station and a taxi stand located in the town centre. A train station is situated in Campotejar, between Archena and Fortuna. The municipality hosts around 48 transport-related businesses.

==== Parks and recreation ====
Archena has several parks, the most notable being next to Plaza Primero de Mayo. Other recreational areas include the Archena picnic area, the Segura River promenade, the Noria of Matías Martínez, the Acebuches Noria, the José Alcolea Lacal Park, and Paira Park.

== Local council ==
In the past, the town hall was housed in a different building. At present, the Casa Grande ("Big House") serves as the seat of the local council. It was built by the Order of St. John in the 15th century as the Casa de la Tercia ("Tercia's House") in a Renaissance style.

As of 2018, the municipal corporation consisted of:

- The Popular Municipal Group (PP), led by Patricia Fernández López, then mayor of Archena, along with councillors responsible for areas including education and equality; taxation, security, agriculture, and water supply; tourism, citizen services, and neighbourhood affairs; human resources, administration, municipal services, sports, and healthcare; family, social welfare, and commerce; urban planning and industry; senior citizens; culture, heritage, festivals, and sustainable development; and youth and local development.
- The Socialist Municipal Group (PSOE), with five councillors.
- The Unidas Podemos Municipal Group, with two councillors.
- The Vox Municipal Group, with one councillor.

== Landmarks ==
=== Spa ===
The Balneario de Archena is the town's best-known landmark. The spa complex includes three hotels, wellness and beauty centres, and ceremonial halls. Its Thermal Space covers an area of 3,000 m^{2} (32,000 sq ft), set within a natural landscape next to the Segura River. Facilities include swimming pools, Jacuzzis, waterfalls, and areas designed for children.

=== Local museum ===
The local museum, built in a modernist style, houses archaeological and historical artefacts from the municipality. It also has a space for temporary exhibitions. The museum is located near Monte del Tío Pío, an area known for its archaeological sites, and also accommodates the tourist office.

=== Esparto museum ===
The Esparto Museum is located in the basement of the Villarría Palace. It displays items made from esparto grass, including replicas of local buildings and traditional agricultural tools.

=== Don Mario's Castle ===
Don Mario's Castle is named after Mario Spreáfico, a physician remembered for providing care to poorer residents of the town. The building has the appearance of a fortress, consisting of a prism-shaped structure with cylindrical towers at its corners. It is privately owned and located on a hill at the edge of the urban centre.

=== The Ope ===
The Ope is a 276-metre hill north of the town and is considered one of Archena's most recognisable landmarks. Its summit is marked by a cross that dates back to the 17th century. Originally made of wood, the current cross is of iron construction. The hill is associated with local legends and is a popular site for hiking, offering views of the town and the Ricote Valley. The ascent is partly walkable, while the upper section requires climbing.

== Demography ==
Archena has a total population of 19,428 inhabitants, comprising 9,223 women and 10,205 men.

The town experienced steady population growth between 1900 and 2008, with an increase of 54 percent, and has continued to expand since then.

In 2020, the municipality had 15,968 Spanish nationals and 3,460 foreign residents, including 351 Europeans, 1,755 Africans, 1,309 Americans and 44 Asians. In 2019, 74 marriages were registered in the municipality.

Key demographic indicators for 2019 were as follows:

- Marriage rate: 3.37
- Birth rate: 9.66
- Mortality rate: 7.88
- Natural growth rate: 1.79

=== Historical Evolution ===
==== Population from 1900 to 2017 ====
According to data published by the INE, on 1 January 2017 the number of inhabitants in Archena was 18,771, an increase of 37 compared with 2016. The following table shows the evolution of the population by sex and in total:

YEAR MEN WOMEN TOTAL

2017	9,817	8,954	18,771
2010	9,455	8,680	18,135
2000	7,211	7,305	14,516
1990	6,717	6,836	13,553
1970	n.a.	n.a.	10,058
1950	n.a.	n.a.	7,567
1920	n.a.	n.a.	6,174
1900	n.a.	n.a.	4,590

==== Maximum seasonal population ====
The maximum seasonal population is an estimate of the highest number of people that the municipality can support. This includes residents, workers, students and temporary visitors with links to Archena.

YEAR	PEOPLE
2016	26,570
2015	21,369
2014	21,369
2013	21,244
2012	21,244
2011	22,622
2010	22,774
2009	22,668
2008	28,386
2005	28,586
2000	16,118

=== Inhabitants by place of birth ===
According to INE data from the 2017 municipal census, 58.39% (10,961) of Archena's residents were born in the municipality, 22.82% migrated from other parts of Spain, and 18.79% (3,527) were born abroad. Of the internal migrants, 16.75% (3,145) were born in other municipalities of the Region of Murcia and 6.06% (1,138) in other autonomous communities.

Between 1996 and 2017:

- The proportion of inhabitants born in Archena increased from 58.39% to 74.95%.
- The proportion of those born elsewhere in the Region of Murcia increased from 16.75% to 17.49%.
- The proportion of those born in other parts of Spain increased from 6.06% to 6.10%.
- The proportion of foreign-born residents increased from 1.46% to 18.79%.

== Education ==
Archena has one public nursery school, Los Colorines, and one private nursery, Pequeñines. There are six public schools providing pre-school and primary education: CEIP Río Segura, CEIP Emilio Candel, CEIP José Alcolea Lacal, CEIP Micaela Sanz, CEIP Miguel Medina, and CEIP N^{a} Sra. de la Fuensanta, the last of which is located in the La Algaida district.

For secondary education, the municipality has two public institutions offering compulsory secondary education, bachillerato, and vocational training programmes: IES Vicente Medina and IES Dr. Pedro Guillén, the latter situated in the El Otro Lao neighbourhood of the La Algaida district.

In addition, Archena has one semi-private school, El Ope, which provides kindergarten, pre-school, primary and secondary education, as well as vocational training.

== Culture ==
=== Festivities ===
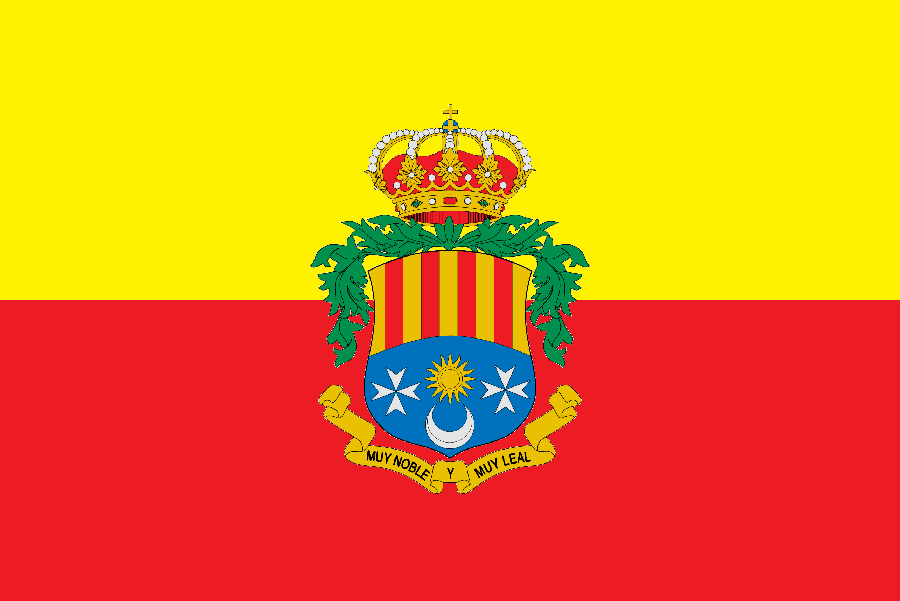
Flag of Archena

In June, the Corpus Christi festivities are held, during which offerings are made to the Virgen de la Salud and a pilgrimage usually takes place. On Corpus Christi day, carpets of coloured salt featuring different motifs are created. In recent years, a "Moros y cristianos" parade has also been included. Other activities during the celebrations include a communal day for paella and another for gachas migas.

On 1 September, the festivity known as El Polvorín ("the ammunition dump") begins. It commemorates an explosion in 1963 at a military explosives warehouse that caused significant material damage but resulted in no fatalities.

=== Local museum ===
Formerly, there was an esparto museum located next to Plaza Primero de Mayo. It has since been replaced by a museum dedicated to Moros y Cristianos.

=== Groups and cultural associations ===
Archena hosts several cultural groups, including the Grupo Folklórico Virgen de la Salud, Grupo Rociero Aires Andaluces, and the Belén Viviente (Nativity scene), which also takes place in Plaza Primero de Mayo. Cultural associations include Villa de Archena, a literary association, and Archena Rociera, a cultural association.

== Health ==
The main health centre in Archena is the Mario Spreáfico Health Centre. The current facility was inaugurated on 20 March 2002 and offers services including paediatrics, nursing, dentistry, and physiotherapy, among others. It also provides programmes aimed at different age groups, such as childcare, women's health, and adult and elderly care.

In addition, an outpatient clinic is located in La Algaida, a district of Archena.

There are five pharmacies distributed throughout the municipality: Fuentes Ayala, C.; López Atenza, V.J.; Martínez Carrillo, M.D.; Peña Llorens, P.; and the Gómez Carrasco pharmacy in La Algaida.

== Economy ==
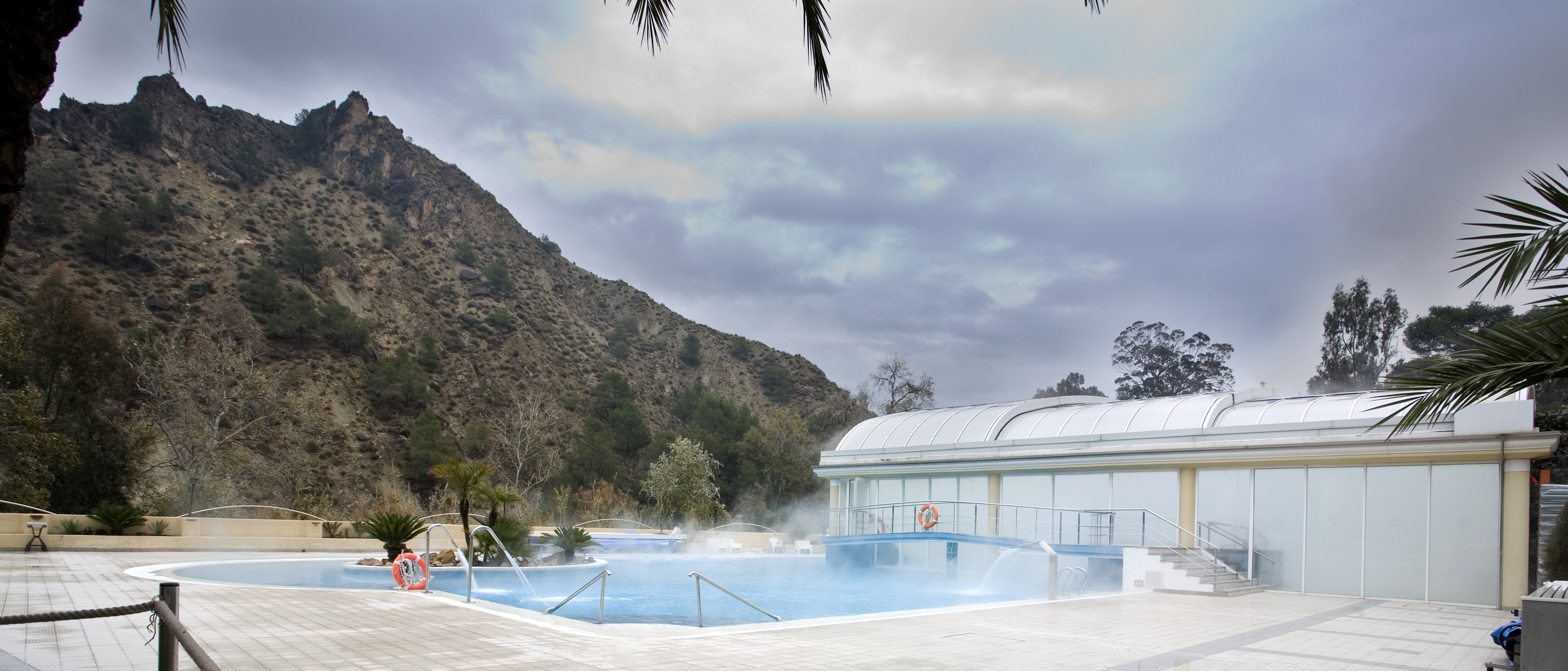
Archena's spa

The primary economic activity in Archena is agriculture. Approximately 1,403 hectares of the municipality are used for farming, with fruit trees being the predominant crops.

The industrial sector is the second main source of income. Archena has an industrial estate, "La Capellanía," where most companies operate in manufacturing, trade, and construction-related activities.

Tourism also contributes to the local economy. Archena has several cultural heritage sites, including museums, churches, and a theatre. However, the most prominent tourist attraction is the Balneario de Archena water spa, which has been in use for approximately 2,000 years and offers thermal baths to visitors.

In 2018, the number of unemployed residents in Archena was 1,221, representing a decrease from the previous year.

== Sports ==
Archena offers a variety of sports and facilities for residents and visitors.

=== Sport centre ===
The town has two football pitches, one for seven-a-side football and another for standard football, accommodating training for age categories from pre-benjamin to U23 during the week. Additional facilities include two tennis courts, a futsal court, a multi-use pavilion for futsal, basketball, rhythmic gymnastics, taekwondo, and full-contact karate, a heated swimming pool available year-round (except during summer, when the municipal pool is used), and a fronton court.

=== José Alcolea Lacal School ===
The pavilion at José Alcolea Lacal School is used as a training facility for the local athletics club, as well as for basketball and rhythmic gymnastics.

=== Private gyms ===
Archena has five privately owned gyms: 1956 Gym, Dorian Gym, FunctionalFit, BodyFitness, and Gimnasio ELITE. These facilities offer a variety of training equipment and programs.

== People from Archena ==
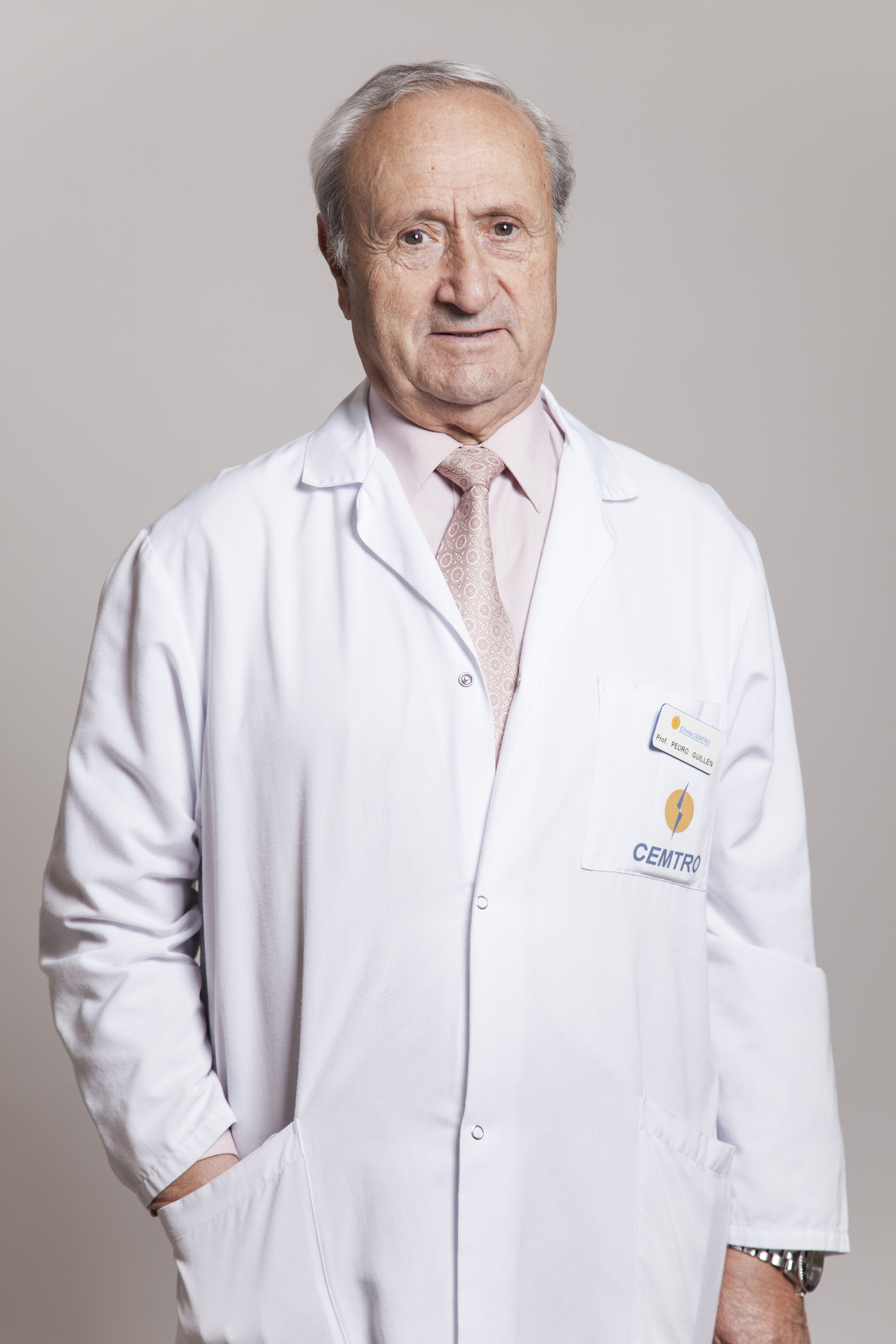
Pedro Guillén, 79 years old

Archena is a small town, so it has produced relatively few widely known figures. Notable individuals from Archena include:

=== Pablo Enríquez ===
Pablo Enríquez was a Cuban patriot who was unable to fight in the Cuban War of Independence due to a heart condition. Instead, he organised humanitarian aid expeditions. After being denounced, he fled to Archena to avoid capture.

=== Pedro Guillén ===
Dr. Pedro Guillén is a specialist in sports medicine who studied at the Complutense University of Madrid. He performed his first knee implant in 1996. His awards include:

- National Prize for Investigation in Sports Medicine by the University of Oviedo (2007)
- Doctor Honoris Causa from The Constantinian University (2004)
- Gold Medal of the Region of Murcia (June 2000)

=== Vicente Medina ===
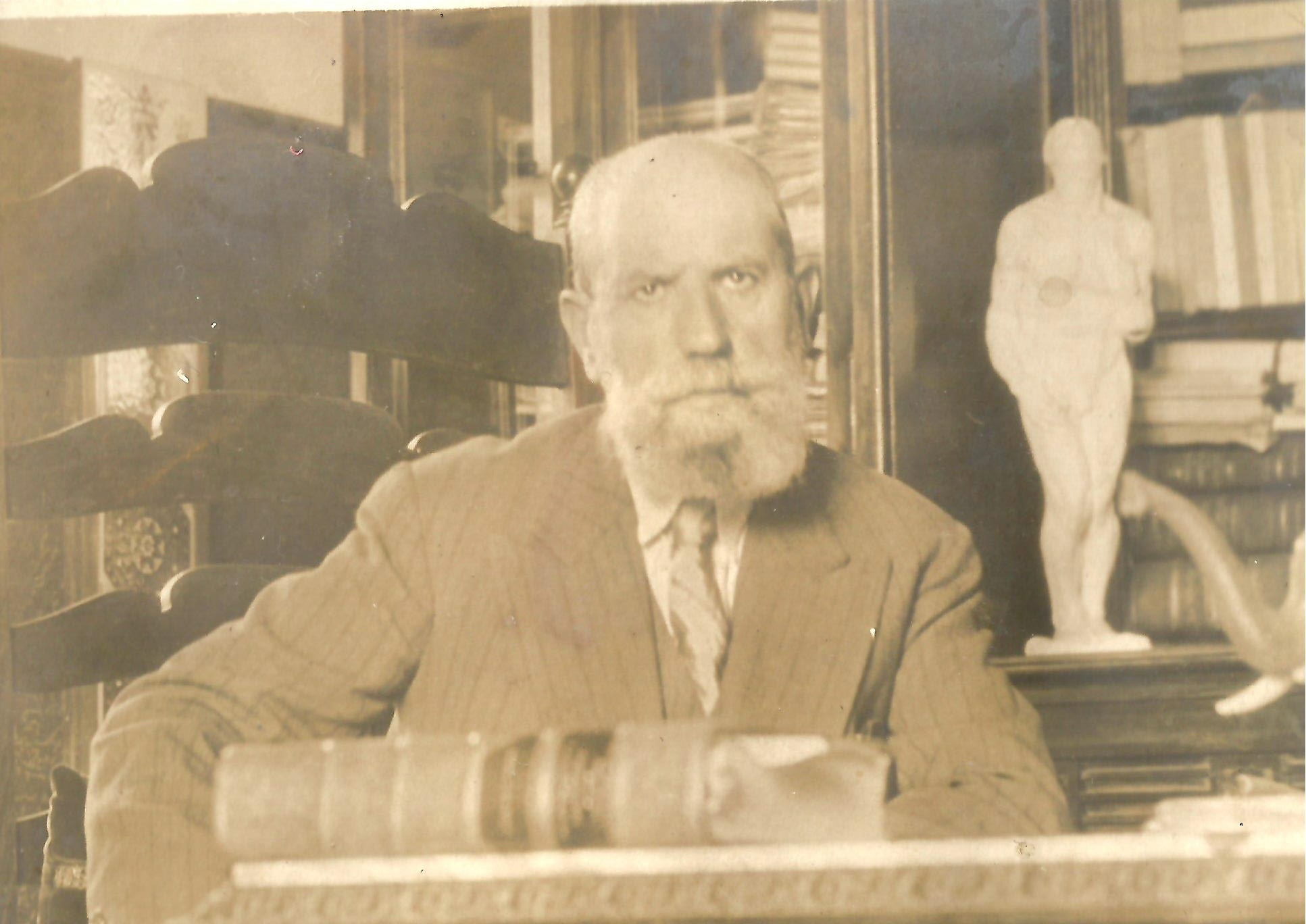
Vicente Medina

Vicente Medina (late 19th–early 20th century) was a Spanish poet and dramatist. His main work, Aires murcianos, is noted for its depiction of sentimental costumbrismo and social criticism. He authored approximately 20 poetry collections and four theatrical dramas. Medina was praised by contemporary writers such as Azorín.

== Security ==
Archena has a Civil Guard barracks and a volunteer Civil defense group. The civil defense unit operates two four-wheel drive vehicles, a patrol car, two motorcycles for forest surveillance, and two motorcycles for road patrol. The unit is organised into four divisions:

- Rescue, City, and Traffic
- Rescue, Sanitary, and First Aid
- Rescue, Countryside, and Environment
- Fire Rescue and Assistance

The civil defense unit is activated only during emergencies, including natural or man-made disasters, or at large public events requiring support from the competent authorities.

== Symbols ==
Coat of arms of Archena

=== Flag ===
The flag of Archena is derived from the colours of the coat of arms and consists of red and yellow bands. These colours, taken from the flag of Aragon, are traditionally associated with generosity, virtue, and quality. The coat of arms of Archena is displayed at the centre of the flag.

=== Coat of arms ===
The coat of arms of Archena is divided into two sections. The upper section features the red and yellow bars characteristic of the Crown of Aragon. A horizontal stripe separates the upper and lower sections. The lower section, set on a blue background, contains a golden sun and a silver crescent moon at the centre, flanked by two silver crosses of Malta. The crescent moon is depicted with tips pointing upward, while the sun is represented as a circle with sixteen rays, symbolizing truth, abundance, wealth, liberality, and benevolence.

Surrounding the coat of arms is a laurel wreath representing victory. The royal crown atop the shield features eight acanthus leaf florets and five pearls. Below the shield is the town's motto: "Muy noble y muy leal" ("Very noble and very loyal").

=== Hymn ===
Archena's official hymn, composed by Emilio Candel, was adopted on 25 July 2002. Originally written for piano, it has since been arranged for various instruments by the teacher Antonio Ginés Abellán.

== Twin towns and sister cities ==
Archena has been twinned with the town of Chesham since March 1995. Chesham is located in the south-east of Buckinghamshire, England, and is well connected to north-west London. It is the terminus of the Metropolitan line of the London Underground. Together with nearby towns such as Amersham, Rickmansworth, Watford, Hemel Hempstead, Berkhamsted, High Wycombe, and Slough, Chesham is part of the Chess Valley, named after the river that flows through the region. The surrounding area is known as the Chiltern Hills. The town has an estimated population of 21,176 and covers an area of 14.11 square kilometres.

== See also ==
- List of municipalities in the Region of Murcia
