= IFA7 =

International governing body of association football

Worldwide
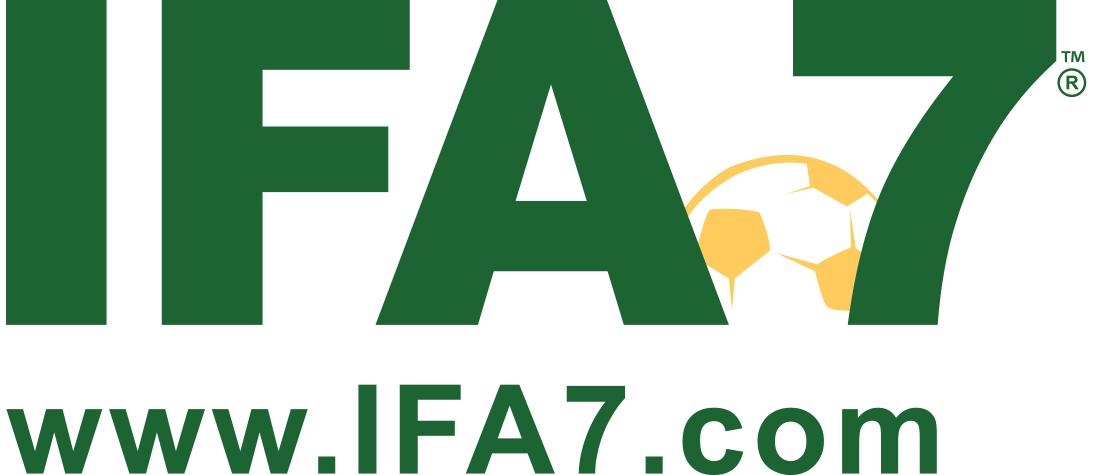
- Founded: 2015; 11 years ago
- Headquarters: Calgary, Canada
- Website: ifa7.com

The International Football Association 7 (IFA7) French: Association internationale de football à 7; Spanish: Asociación Internacional de Fútbol 7) is the world governing body for seven-a-side football. It was founded in January 2015 by Daniel Balcorta to organize, regulate, promote and develop Football 7 internationally. Headquartered in Calgary, Canada, its membership now comprises 29 national associations.

IFA7 has grown through a network of member associations, authorized representatives, competition organizers, clubs, athletes, referees and institutional partners.

From its earliest competitions in Latin America to the expansion of its international structure across several continents, IFA7 has worked to establish professional opportunities for national teams, clubs and participants in Football 7.

== History ==
IFA7 officially launched its international operations in 2015.

The first IFA7™ Nations Cup was held in Quito, Ecuador, with the participation of the national teams of Argentina, Canada, Ecuador and Mexico. Ecuador won the competition and became the first Nations Cup champion.

This event laid the foundation for the international competition program of IFA7.

2016 — International Competition Expansion. The first IFA7 COPA AMÉRICA™ was held in San José, Costa Rica, where Peru became continental champion. IFA7 also continued developing the IFA7 WORLD CLUBS CHAMPIONSHIP™, creating an international platform through which authorized clubs could compete beyond their domestic competitions.

2017 — The First World Championship. The first global championship for national teams was held in Retalhuleu, Guatemala, where Russia became the first IFA7 world champion.

Its future competition program includes additional international, continental, women’s, youth and veteran competitions.

== International competitions ==
=== National teams ===
==== Worldwide ====
- IFA7 World Championship
- IFA7 Nations Cup

==== Invitational tournaments ====
- IFA7 International Challenge

==== South America ====
- IFA7 Copa América

=== Clubs ===
==== Worldwide ====
- IFA7 World Clubs Championship

== See also ==
- FIF7
