= Vicente Medina =

Spanish poet, dramatist and editor

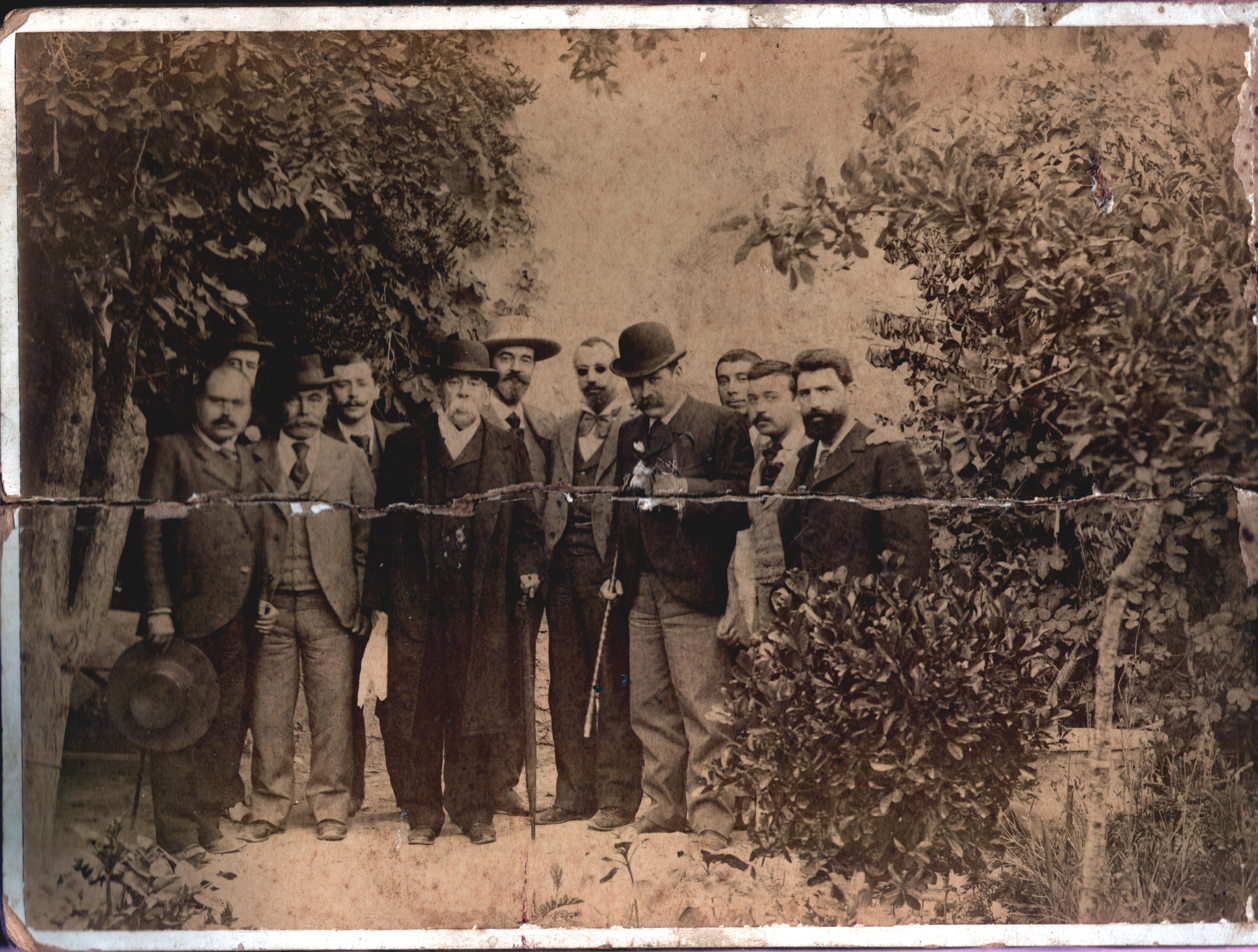
- Vicente Medina on the right of the group, with black beard
- Born: 27 October 1866; Archena, Spain
- Died: 17 August 1937 (aged 70); Rosario, Santa Fe, Argentina
- Resting place: Cementerio de la Piedad, Rosario, Santa Fe
- Occupations: Poet, Dramatist
- Writing career
- Language: Spanish
- Period: 1895–1932
- Notable work: Aires murcianos (1898)

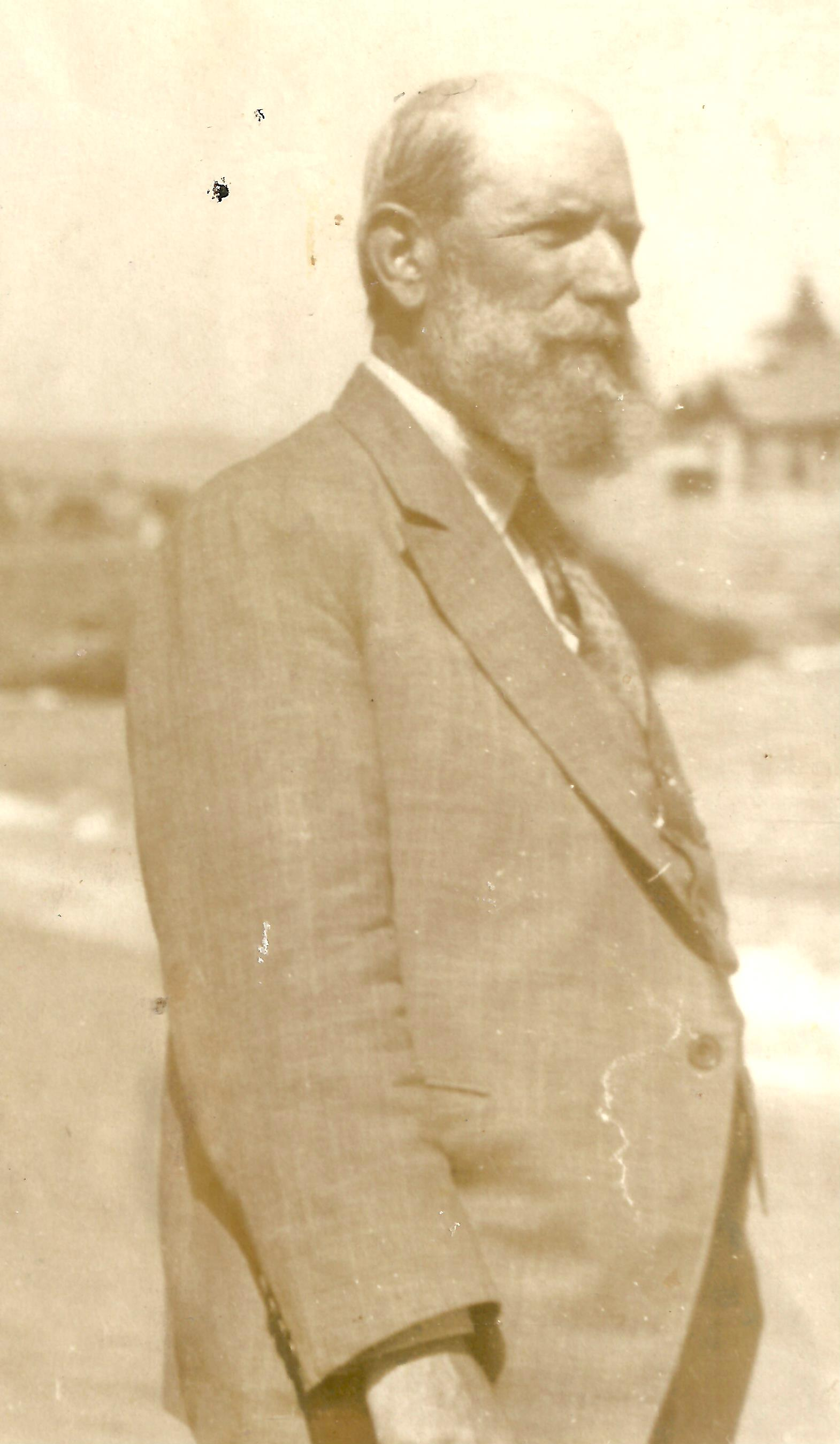

Vicente Tomás Medina (Spanish pronunciation: [biˈθente toˈmas meˈðina]; 27 October 1886 – 17 August 1937) was a Spanish poet, dramatist and editor, and a symbol of local identity for the Murcia region of southeastern Spain. His best-known work, Aires murcianos ("Murcian airs"), was taken up as a reference point for local cultural and social criticism, and was widely praised by contemporaries. In his time Medina was considered in Spain to be one of the country's most important writers, referred to as "the great contemporary Spanish poet" and "the Spanish poet of poets". His fame has since declined, and he is now little read; but he remains an important figure as the greatest poet to have written in the Murcian dialect.

== Life and works ==
Medina was born in 1866 in the small spa town of Archena, some 25 kilometres from the regional capital Murcia. His mother was a dressmaker; his father, Juan de Dios Medina, was a small businessman who was known for his love of literature and the arts. Juan de Dios ran the store at the Archena spa, where the young Medina was exposed to authors such as Gustavo Adolfo Becquer, José de Espronceda, Victor Hugo and Emile Zola.

After a spell in the army – including a period in the Philippines, where his first poems were composed – he returned in 1890 to the Murcia region and settled in the port city of Cartagena, where he found work with a publishing house that ran two local newspapers. The following year he married Josefa Sanchez Vera in Archena, the couple returning to Cartagena to set up home. Medina became active in the city's literary circles, publishing collaborative pieces in local journals and mixing with Bartolomé Pérez Casas, his cousin Inocencio Medina Vera, and – most importantly – José García Glass, who became a close friend and mentor.

=== Literary success ===
His first mature publication was the poem "El Náufrago" in 1895, although he later disowned it. Greater success came with his first play, which had been inspired by linguistic considerations. Outraged at the way local dialect had been used as comic relief in Carnival celebrations, Medina had set about to write a serious work in the local Murcian Spanish; the result was El Rento, first performed in 1898. It was very well received by national critics and also by writers such as Miguel de Unamuno and Clarín, and the response encouraged him to explore the possibilities of dialect literature further. Medina gathered the series of poems that he had composed in preparation for El Rento and released them as Aires murcianos, which would become his most famous and successful work. A study of the poorest members of Murcia's rural community, it combined social criticism with inventive use of local language, and led the critic Azorín to write that, if Medina wrote nothing else, that book would be "enough to place [him] among the great poets of our Parnassus".

=== Emigration and return ===
Medina emigrated to Argentina in 1905, following several family members. He continued to work, editing a literary magazine called Letras and publishing an anti-war poem, La Canción de la guerra, in 1915 during the First World War. He returned to Murcia in 1931, releasing his final book, Belén de pastores y villancicos, there; but with the Spanish Civil War on the verge of breaking out, he was advised to return to Argentina for his safety and he did so in 1936, already ill. He died in 1937 in Rosario, Santa Fe, where he is buried at Cemetery of La Piedad.

== Selected works ==
=== Poetry ===
- Aires murcianos (1898)
- Alma del Pueblo (1900)
- La Canción de la vida (1902)
- La Canción de la guerra (1915)
- Abonico (1917)
- ¡Allá Lejicos! (1928)

=== Drama ===
- El Rento (1898)
- ¡Lorenzo! (1899)
- El Alma del Molino (1902)
