= FIF7 =

International governing body of association football

Worldwide
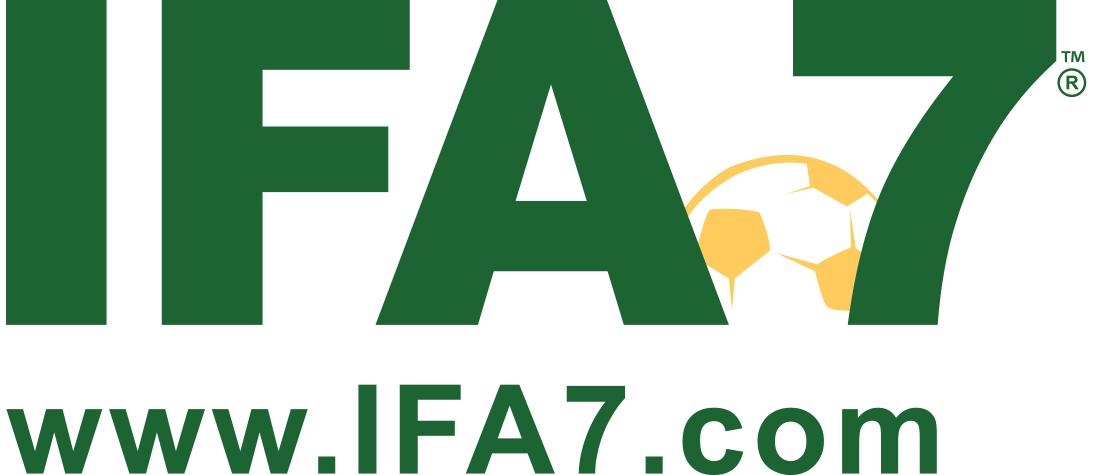
- Founded: 2011; 15 years ago
- Headquarters: Rio de Janeiro, Brazil
- Website: football7official.com/

The Football 7 International Federation (FIF7) French: Fédération internationale de football à 7; Spanish: Federación Internacional de Fútbol 7) is the world governing body for seven-a-side football. It was founded in 2011 to organize, regulate, promote and develop men's and women's Football 7 globally. Headquartered in Rio de Janeiro, Brazil, its membership now comprises over 40 national associations.

It is responsible for organizing official international competitions such as the Football 7 World Championship, the F7 League of the Americas, the F7 Recopa Sudamericana, the F7 Central America Cup, and International Challenges, among others.

FIF7's mission is to organize, standardize, administer, promote, and develop Football 7. Its focus lies in the development of players and coaches through mental and emotional growth and the social environment.

== History ==
FIF7 officially launched its international operations in 2011.

The first Football 7 World Championship was held in Rio de Janeiro, Brazil in 2011. Italy won the competition and became the first World champion.

2012 – The first Football 7 World Club Championship was held in Rio de Janeiro, Brazil, where Botafogo became World champion.

2013 – The First FIF7 International Challenge was held in Rio de Janeiro, Brazil, where Flamengo won the competition.

2014 – The First F7 League of the Americas was held in Lima, Peru, where Fluminense won the competition.

2015 – The First F7 Recopa Sudamericana was held in Oaxaca, Mexico, where Atlético Atizapán won the competition.

2016 – The First F7 Copa Sudamericana was held in Lima, Peru, where Sidekicks won the competition.

2017 – The First F7 Copa América was held in Lima, Peru, where Mexico won the competition. FIF7 also organized the first F7 International Cup in Curitiba, Brazil, where Brazil won the Intercontinental Cup and the first F7 Women's Club World Championship in Tarumã, Brazil, where Figueirense became World champion.

2018 – The First F7 Women's Copa América was held in Curitiba, Brazil, where Brazil became World champion. Also FIF7 organizes the first F7 Copa Centroamérica in Mexico City, Mexico, where Leonas FC won the competition. In 2018, the Women's World Cup was held for the first time in Curitiba, Brazil, and the hosts became the first world champions.

2019 – The First F7 Women's Copa Centroamérica was held in Barcelona, Spain, where Brazil became champion.

== International competitions ==
=== National teams ===
==== Worldwide ====
- Football 7 World Championship

==== Intercontinental ====
- F7 League of the Americas
- F7 Recopa Sudamericana

==== Central America ====
- F7 Central America Cup

==== South America ====
- F7 Copa América
- F7 Copa Sudamericana
- F7 Pacific Cup

=== Clubs ===
==== Worldwide ====
- Football 7 World Club Championship

== See also ==
- IFA7
