= Morena Beltrán =

Argentine television presenter and sports journalist

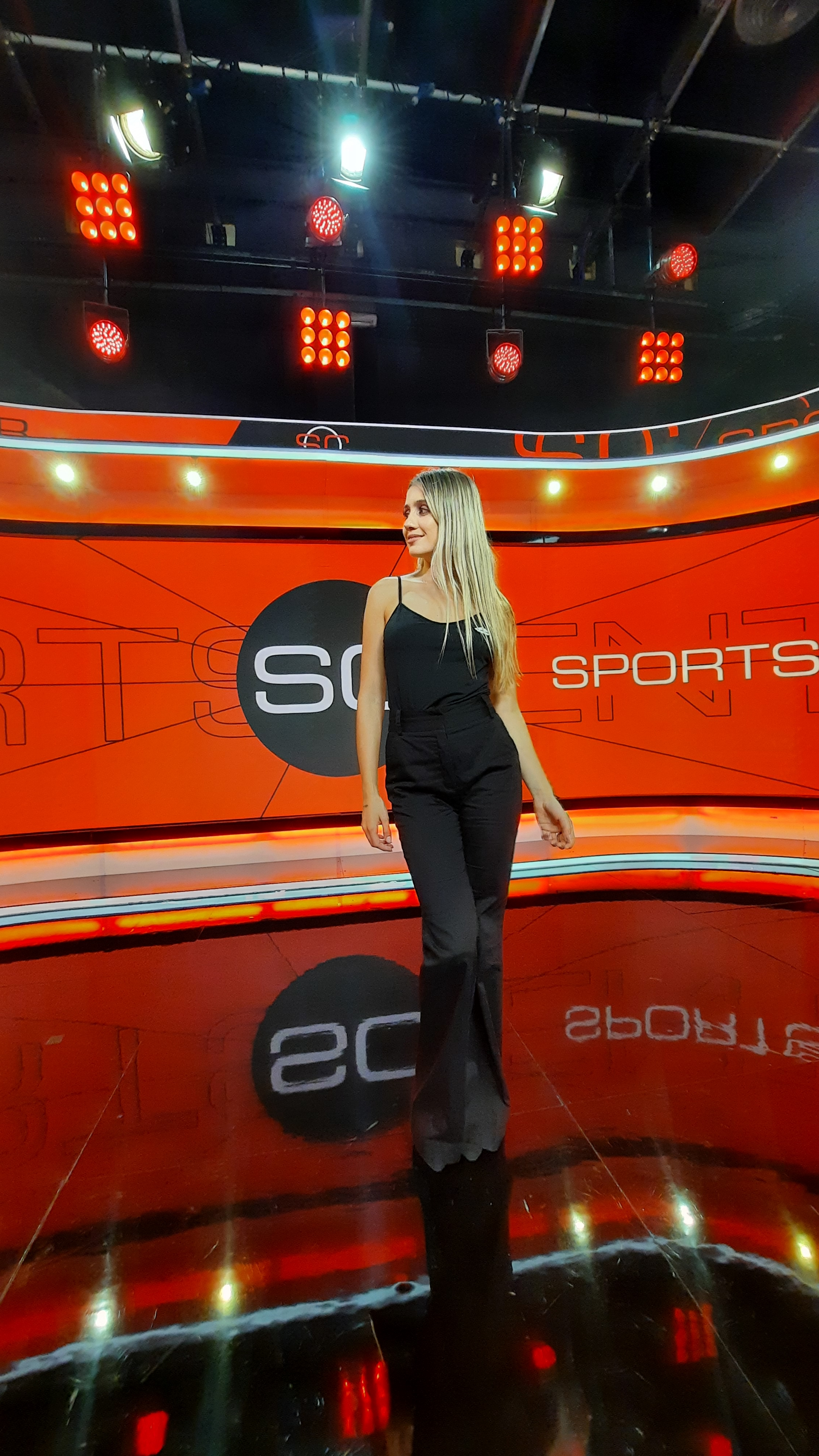

Morena Beltrán (born January 29, 1999) is an Argentine television presenter, sports journalist, and former chairwoman of Queens League side Kunitas.

== Early life ==
Beltrán was born in Haedo, Argentina.

== Career ==
Beltrán studied journalism at journalism school Deportea. In 2019, she started working for ESPN.
