= IFA7 World Championship =

- Organiser(s): IFA7
- Founded: 2017
- Region: International
- Teams: 8
- Current champions: Honduras (1nd title)
- Most championships: Honduras, Peru, Russia (1 titles)
- Broadcaster: DAZN
- 2026 IFA7 World Championship

The IFA7 World Championship is an international seven-a-side football tournament organized by the International Football Association 7 (IFA7). This tournament features teams to represent their respective nations, similar to the FIFA's World Cup.

== History ==
First IFA7 World Championship Portuguese: IFA7 Copa Mundial de Futebol 7; Spanish: IFA7 Copa Mundial de Fútbol 7) for national teams took place in Guatemala in October 2017. 13th national teams participated in the tournament, divided into four groups. The group winners advanced to the semi-finals. The Russian national team became champions after defeating Guatemala 4–2 in the final.

The next edition of the World Championship took place in Peru in 2022; in the final, the hosts defeated El Salvador 8–5.

Honduras won the 2026 IFA7 World Championship. The tournament took place from May 25 to 31, 2026, in the country's capital, Tegucigalpa.

== Results ==
| Ed. | Year | Host | Final | | | Third place game | | | Teams |
| Ed. | Year | Host | Champions | Score | Runners-up | Third place | Score | Fourth place | Teams |
|---|---|---|---|---|---|---|---|---|---|
| 1 | 2017 | Guatemala, Retalhuleu | Russia | 4–2 | Guatemala | Uruguay | ?–? | Mexico | 13 |
| 2 | 2022 | Peru, Lima | Mexico | 8–5 | El Salvador | Venezuela | 3–2 | Chile | 8 |
| 3 | 2026 | Honduras, Tegucigalpa | Honduras | 4–2 | Indonesia | Canada | 3–3 (2–1 p.) | Brazil | 8 |

== Teams reaching the final ==
Teams reaching the top four
| Team | Titles | Runners-up | Third place | Top 3 total |
|---|---|---|---|---|
| Russia | 1 (2017) | | | 1 |
| Peru | 1 (2022) | | | 1 |
| Honduras | 1 (2026) | | | 1 |
| Guatemala | | 1 | | 1 |
| El Salvador | | 1 | | 1 |
| Indonesia | | 1 | | 1 |
| Uruguay | | | 1 | 1 |
| Venezuela | | | 1 | 1 |
| Canada | | | 1 | 1 |

== See also ==
- FIF7 World Cup
- IFA7 Nations Cup
