= FIF7 World Cup =

- Organiser(s): FIF7
- Founded: 2011
- Region: International
- Teams: 16
- Current champions: Brazil (2nd title)
- Most championships: Brazil (2 titles)
- Broadcaster: DAZN
- 2026 FIF7 World Cup

The FIF7 World Cup is an international seven-a-side football tournament organized by the Federation Internationale de Football 7 (FIF7). This tournament features teams to represent their respective nations, similar to the FIFA's World Cup.

== History ==
Football 7 World Championship Portuguese: Mundialito de Futebol 7; Spanish: Mundialito de Fútbol 7) for national teams took place from August 10 to 14, 2011, at Arena Copacabana—a temporary venue built in Rio de Janeiro, Brazil — marking the inaugural edition of the tournament. The event was organized by the sports marketing company Koch Tavares and sanctioned by the then-existing Brazilian 7-a-Side Football Confederation (CF7). Eight national teams participated in the tournament, divided into two groups. The group winners and the runners-up advanced to the semi-finals. The Italian national team became champions after defeating Brazil 3–2 in the final, with goals from Grana, Foglia, and Marcelo for Italy, and Cauê and Daniel for Brazil.

Subsequent editions of the Mundialito took place in 2012, 2013, and 2014, followed by a long hiatus. Four years later, the world championship was organized again under the official name "FIF7 World Cup" Portuguese: Copa Mundial FIF7; Spanish: Copa Mundial FIF7). The dition was held in 2018 in Curitiba, Brazil.

The last championship in Brazil in August 2025 was won by the Brazilian national team.

== Results ==
| Ed. | Year | Host | Final | | | Third place game | | | Teams |
| Ed. | Year | Host | Champions | Score | Runners-up | Third place | Score | Fourth place | Teams |
|---|---|---|---|---|---|---|---|---|---|
| 1 | 2011 | Brazil, Río de Janeiro | Italy | 3–2 | Brazil | Uruguay | 8—5 | Peru | 8 |
| 2 | 2012 | Brazil, Río de Janeiro | Brazil | ?–? | Italy | Mexico | ?–? | Argentina | 4 |
| 3 | 2013 | Brazil, Río de Janeiro | Brazil | ?–? | Italy | Mexico | ?–? | Argentina | 8 |
| 4 | 2014 | Brazil, São José dos Pinhais | Brazil | ?–? | Mexico | Italy | ?–? | Japan | 6 |
| 5 | 2018 | Brazil, Curitiba | Brazil | 5–4 | Mexico | Kazakhstan | 9–7 | Argentina | 8 |
| 6 | 2019 | Italy, Rome | Russia | 6–1 | Mexico | Brazil | 8–2 | Chile | 12 |
| 7 | 2021 | Brazil, Río de Janeiro | Brazil | 4–3 | Russia | Argentina | 9–2 | Angola | 6 |
| 9 | 2023 | Mexico, Puebla | Mexico | 0–0 (3–2 p.) | Brazil | Russia | 4–2 | Peru | 16 |
| 10 | 2025 | Brazil, Curitiba | Brazil | 4–2 | Italy | Mexico | 4–0 | Mozambique | 12 |

== Teams reaching the final ==
Teams reaching the top four
| Team | Titles | Runners-up | Third place | Top 3 total |
|---|---|---|---|---|
| Brazil | 6 (2012, 2013, 2014, 2018, 2021, 2025) | 2 | 1 | 9 |
| Italy | 1 (2023) | 3 | 1 | 5 |
| Mexico | 1 (2011) | 3 | 2 | 6 |
| Russia | 1 (2019) | 1 | 1 | 3 |
| Uruguay | | | 1 | 1 |
| Kazakhstan | | | 1 | 1 |
| Argentina | | | 1 | 1 |

== See also ==
- IFA7 World Championship
- IFA7 Nations Cup
