= 7's Football League =

- Founded: 2018; 8 years ago
- Country: Philippines
- Level on pyramid: 1
- Domestic cup: Kampeon Cup
- Current champions: Senior Division; Men's: Lamasia FC (1st title); Women's: Kaya F.C. (3rd title)
- Most championships: Senior Division; Men's: Super Eagles (3 titles); Women's: Kaya F.C. (3 titles)
- Sponsor: Skechers

The 7's Football League (7s FL) is a seven-a-side football league in the Philippines. Established in 2018, the league already had four seasons. It has a two-tiered men's division, a women's division, and youth divisions. The league is an open tournament with participation from representative sides of the domestic football competition, the Philippines Football League.

== History ==
Philippine national team player Anton del Rosario retired in 2018 and established the 7's Football League (7s FL). Sponsors were secured for the league in less than a week with the debut season's title sponsor being Go Well. The founding of the league was amidst uncertainty in the Philippines Football League which saw the withdrawal of two of its eight teams from the 2017 season. The league also provided an opportunity for foreign players who played in the United Football League displaced by the imposition of the AFC 3+1 foreigner cap rule. It was intended that three 7s FL seasons be held every year.

The first season began with just the men's division with six teams participating. Matches were held at the McKinley Hill Stadium in Taguig.

The second season began in July 2018 with ten teams. By that time 7s FL became the second league in Asia to be affiliated with FIF7, the international body for 7-a-side football, with the first being India. The 7s FL began to consider holding matches outside Metro Manila and began working on partnerships in Guam and Brunei as part of a Philippine bid to host the 2019 FIF7 World Cup and set up more 7-a-side leagues in Asia.

The 7sFL began accommodating youth squads in the third season which began in February 2019. with tournaments for age groups U9, U11, U13 and U15. In March 2019, the women's division was introduced with eight squads participating in the first iteration. The fourth season began with the first edition of the Kampeon Cup which was held from July 27 to 28. The league tournament proper of the fourth season began in September 2019 with 66 teams across seven divisions; Premier Division, Women's Division, Men's Division, U15, U13, U11, and U9. By the end of the fourth season, the league has already held select matches outside Metro Manila, in venues in Iloilo, Bacolod, and Davao. The league was given the Best in Sports Youth Development Program award at the 2019 SPIA Asia.

The league further expanded in the fifth season with its first matches to be held simultaneously in venues in Muntinlupa, Clark, Bacolod and Davao on February 9, 2020, and in Iloilo on February 15. 24 teams will participate in the men's division, 10 in the women's division, and 48 teams in the youth divisions. However, the season was disrupted by the COVID-19 pandemic.

In April 2021, the 7's Football League management announced plans to set up tournaments in Brunei and the United States.

In April 2023, the Asia 7s Football Championship was held with teams from Brunei, India, Japan, and the Philippines participating.

Skechers became the main sponsor of the 7s FL in February 2025.

== Rules and regulations ==
Each team in the 7's Football League as its name suggest starts a match with seven on-field players as opposed to eleven of a regular association football match. Matches consists of two halves with 15 minute each and are played at a smaller field than the standard football pitch. There is also no restrictions on the number of foreigners a team can field or rules barring individuals with no prior professional football experience from playing.

== Champions ==
=== 7s Super League ===
- 2024: Pampanga Strikers
- 2025: Alabang South Supers

=== Men's Division (Premier) ===
- Season 1: Super Eagles
- Season 2: Super Eagles
- Season 3: Ghana F.C.
- Season 4: Super Eagles
- Season 5: Cancelled
- Season 6: Rangers FC PH
- Season 7: Super Rangers FC
- Season 8: Lamasia FC
- Season 9: TBD

=== Women's Division ===
- Season 1-2: Not held
- Season 3: OutKast
- Season 4: Stallion–Hiraya
- Season 5: Cancelled
- Season 6: Kaya
- Season 7: Kaya
- Season 8: Kaya
- Season 9: TBD

=== Asia 7s ===
Ed.	Year	Host	Final		
Ed.	Year	Host	(gold) Champions	Score	(silver) Runners-up
1	2023	Philippines	Japan (Japan Football 7 Society Association)	3–2	India
2	2024	Malaysia	Japan (Japan Football 7 Society Association)	2–1	Philippines (Azkals 7s)
3	2025	Philippines	Guam (Strykers FC)	2–0	Philippines (BGC Soldiers)
