= Spursito =

Internet celebrity (born 1997)

- Born: Martí Miràs Nadal; 31 May 1997 (age 29); Andorra
- Occupations: YouTuber; Twitch streamer

Kick information
- Channel: Spursito
- Followers: 54 thousand (13 October 2024)

Twitch information
- Channel: Spursito
- Followers: 1.5 million

YouTube information
- Channel: Spursito
- Years active: 2015–present
- Genres: Gaming; Sport
- Subscribers: 1.6 million
- Views: 278 million

Martí Miràs Nadal, known as Spursito, is an Andorran streamer and YouTuber. He presides Rayo de Barcelona in both Kings League and Queens League.

== Early life ==
Spursito was born in Andorra and moved to Spain with his family at a young age.

== Career ==
In 2016, he decided to create a YouTube channel that eventually gained hundreds of thousands of subscribers. He then set up a Twitch channel, which eventually gained a million followers, the content of which mainly involved football video game FIFA.

Besides his channels, he presented 'El Córner' from La Liga and is co-host of 'Al Toke' on UBEAT. After that, he became the president of seven-a-side football club Rayo de Barcelona in the Kings League and the Queens League, and released a children's book, Juan Demonio y la Operación Mafia. He acted as a Rayo de Barcelona player in a Kings League match and was involved in other games (including from the Queens League) scoring goals via president penalty kick.

== Personal life ==
Spursito lives in Barcelona, Spain.
