= Sandra Luzardo =

Venezuelan footballer (born 1999)

Personal information
- Full name: Sandra Paola Luzardo León
- Date of birth: 18 July 1999 (age 27)
- Place of birth: Mérida, Venezuela
- Height: 1.70 m (5 ft 7 in)
- Position: Centre-back

Youth career
- Mérida Country Club

Senior career*
Years	Team	Apps	(Gls)
2016	Caucheros de Mérida		
2016	Estudiantes de Guárico		
2017–2018	Deportivo Táchira		
2019–2020	Fundación Albacete	16	(1)
2020–2021	Alhama	11	(1)
2021–2022	Levante B		

International career^{‡}
2014	Venezuela U15	4	(0)
2014–2016	Venezuela U17	11	(1)
2014	Venezuela	1	(0)
- * Club domestic league appearances and goals as of 28 February 2021 ‡ National team caps and goals as of 21 October 2016

Sandra Paola Luzardo León (born 18 July 1999) is a Venezuelan footballer who plays as a centre back. She capped for the Venezuela women's national team.

== International career ==
Luzardo represented Venezuela at the 2014 Summer Youth Olympics and two FIFA U-17 Women's World Cup editions (2014 and 2016). At senior level, she made her debut on 22 November 2014 in a 3–0 friendly victory against Nicaragua.
