= Sara Ronzero =

Spanish footballer (born 2001)

Personal information
- Full name: Sara Ronzero Sánchez
- Date of birth: 5 December 2001 (age 24)
- Place of birth: Madrid, Spain
- Position: Midfielder

Youth career
- 2015–2017: Madrid CFF

Senior career*
Years	Team	Apps	(Gls)
2017–2018	Samper		
2018–2019	Madrid CFF B		
2019–2021	Atlético Madrid B	36	(0)
2021–2022	Madrid CFF B	28	(0)
2021–2022	Madrid CFF	2	(0)
- * Club domestic league appearances and goals as of 1 July 2022

Sara Ronzero Sánchez (born 5 December 2001) is a Spanish former footballer who played as a midfielder for Madrid CFF until her retirement in July 2022.

== Club career ==
Ronzero started her career at Madrid CFF.
