= Queens League =

Seven-a-side football league in Barcelona

- Founded: 24 February 2023; 3 years ago
- Country: Spain
- Broadcaster(s): Kings League (Twitch, YouTube, TikTok); Cuatro
- Website: queensleague.pro

The Queens League is a seven-a-side football league established in 2023 by Gerard Piqué, football personalities and internet streamers. It is based on the Kings League, launched by Piqué shortly before. The league rules include a tie-breaker penalty shoot-out, unlimited substitutions, and the implementation of secret weapons. As of 2025, the Queens League has expanded to include Queens League Americas (Hispanic America).

== History ==
Shortly after the inaugural season of the Kings League began, Oriol Querol, CEO of Kings League and Kosmos Holding director, announced the Queens League, a competition for women. From May 2023, Queens League matches are played on Saturdays, ahead of Kings League matches on Sundays. Former Spain players like Priscila Borja and Ana Romero offered themselves to join the Queens League. Ibai Llanos of Porcinos was the first Kings League chairperson to confirm the creation of his women's team, Porcinas. Former player Borja Fernández offered to coach the team. The Queens League had a launch event on 24 February 2023 at Cupra Arena, with all of the Kings League teams taking part; some have changed branding for the women's team, and some have introduced more female streamers and popular figures as chairpersons.

While the Kings League's first season saw involvement from former professional footballers, the Queens League also includes current professionals, particularly in the organisation of teams: FC Barcelona Femení and Switzerland player Ana-Maria Crnogorčević is part of the staff of Saiyans FC; her teammates Patricia Guijarro, Clàudia Pina, and Sandra Paños are all ambassadors, as are Jennifer Hermoso and Chile player Christiane Endler. The number one draft pick was Zaragoza CFF, Egypt, and former Barcelona player Sara Ismael. Mexican sports newspaper Récord wrote upon the announcement of the Queens League that it would be important in promoting gender equality in the world of video gaming. The Queens League teams are given the same conditions and pay as the Kings League. In May 2023, Pique and Spanish broadcasting company Mediaset announced that one match each day – the 8 pm games of both the Queens League and Kings League – would be broadcast on free-to-air television on channel Cuatro, which broadcasts most sports content. Highlights from other games and the related talkshows Chup Chup and After are also shown on Cuatro.

== Format and rules ==
A season is formed of a winter split (beginning in January) and a summer split (beginning in May), taking place over 13 weeks (including regular season and play-offs) and with 11 regular matches per team in each split. The twelve teams face each other once in regular season, with six matches taking place consecutively on a matchday. At the end of each regular season, the eight best-placed teams face each other in the play-offs, which takes place as a seeded bracket. VAR is used both for decisions and in place of goal-line technology.

Matches are 40 minutes long, consisting of two 20-minute halves, with a 3-minute half-time break; the rules state that timewasting will be punished. If the scores are tied at the end of a match, a penalty shoot-out tiebreaker will be used, with players taking the shots from the halfway line. Match kick-off has the ball in the centre of the pitch and players at their own ends. Teams have unlimited substitutions; some league rules can prevent specific substitutions if enacted. Team staff have to remain seated on the bench throughout the match, except for giving instructions to players or using the button to enact different special rules. Each team has secret weapon cards, which can grant a penalty in their favour, a shootout, taking off an opposition player for 2 minutes, double-score goals for 2 minutes, a wildcard, and to steal another team's card.

Several special rules were voted for by fans on social media. Yellow cards see the player benched for 2 minutes, with red cards sending the player off and not allowing a substitute to enter for 5 minutes. League cards can be played by league representatives, rather than teams, from the 18th minute, which force both teams to remove players and continue the first half as equal number of players fewer than seven. If the match is played 2v2 (or 1v1) and a player receives a card, the exclusion will begin in the second half. Gameplay changes if 1v1 has been selected: each player may only play in their half and the centre circle, and cannot stop shots with the hands; a countdown clock of 10 seconds is applied to possession before needing to shoot or turnover. Each team has a roster of 12 players, with 10 selected in the draft. The other roster slots are for the 11th player, typically a professional who stays with the team for the split, and the 12th player, another guest who can change on every matchday.

== Draft and market ==
The Queens League and Kings League have a draft and trade system based on North American sports. The trading system uses a virtual economy in which teams are supplied a fixed amount of "Euros" (100 million) by the league. Players can be exchanged for "Euros" (or in player swaps, for draft picks, or a combination), but there is no real currency involved. The drafts and markets are held over a similar period. The combined Kings and Queens League market ahead of the 2024 season, held as a one-week transfer window, used asset exchanges as the means of trade.

== Criticism ==
Before the league began, there was criticism from Porcinas' Ibai Llanos, who said that after the tests some of the candidates had been approached by other teams to sign them as 11th or 12th player, without having to go through drafting.

== Competitions ==
=== International ===
- Queens Finalissima

=== Leagues ===
- Queens League Spain
- Queens League Mexico

=== Cups ===
- Queens Cup Intercontinental
- Queens Cup Spain
- Queens Cup Mexico

== Teams ==
=== Queens League Spain ===
Team	Chairperson
1K FC	(Spain) Maite Carrillo (Mayichi)
El Barrio	(Spain) Adri Contreras
Jijantas FC	(Spain) Gerard Romero and Lisbeth Cid
Las Troncas FC	(Spain) Violeta G
PIO FC	(Mexico) Samantha Rivera (Rivers)
Porcinas FC	(Spain) Gemma Gallardo (Gemita)
Rayo de Barcelona	(Andorra) Martí Miràs (Spursito)
Saiyans FC	(Spain) Totakeki
Ultimate Móstoles	(Spain) Noelia San Martín (Noe9977)
Las Pilares	(Spain) Marina Rivers and (Spain) Lucii

==== Queens League Next Level teams ====
Team	Chairperson
Balanceadas FC	(Spain) Abril Cols and Andrea Garte
FLOP FC	(Spain) clersssss
Fun-Hadas FC	(Spain) Mar Lucas
Madam FC	(Spain) Celia Reina and Cristobal
Sakura FC	(Spain) Abby
Vellakas FC	(Spain) Cristina Pedroche and Vicky López

=== Queens League Mexico ===
Team	Chairperson(s)
(Colombia) Atlético Parceras	(Colombia) Valeria La Parce
(Mexico) Club América	(Mexico) Gigi Galaisha
(Mexico) Club de Cuervos	(Mexico) Natalia García (NataliaMX)
(Dominican Republic) Galácticas del Caribe	(Dominican Republic) Angelo "Will" Valdés and Vincent Pérez (Los Futbolitos) and Isa Rockets
(United States) Las Aliens 1021	(United States) Edwin Castro (Castro) and Pitaa1021
(Mexico) Peluche Caligari	(Mexico) Álex (Escorpión Dorado) and Gabriel Montiel (Werevertumorro)
(Peru) Persas FC	(Mexico) Bárbara Núñez
(Uruguay) Raniza FC	(Mexico) Alana Flores (AlanaLaRana)
(Argentina) KRÜ FC	(Mexico) Dare Esparza
(Mexico) Straight Edge United	(Mexico) Iván Navarrete (Pipepunk), (Uruguay) Diego Balsa (BarcaGamer) & (Mexico) Javier Nino (Javetas)

=== Defunct teams ===
Team	Chairperson(s)
(Spain) Aniquiladoras FC	(Mexico) Amairani Alonso (AmaBlitz)
(Argentina) Muchachas FC	(Argentina) Jero Freixas and Josefina de Cabo
(Mexico) Olimpo United	(Spain) Esperanza Borrás (Espe)
(Chile) Real Titán	(Mexico) Vicky Palami
(Colombia) Las Santas FC	(Spain) Anna Lluna (Lluna Clark)
(Spain) xBuyer Team	(Spain) Javier (xBuyer) and Eric Ruiz (MiniBuyer)
(Venezuela) Las Chamas FC	(Mexico) Karen Torres

== See also ==
- Kings League
- Media football
- Women's football in Spain
