= Sara Ismael =

Egyptian footballer (born 1999)

Sara Ismael سارة اسماعيل
Personal information
- Full name: Sara Ismael Mohamed
- Birth name: Sara Ismael Salgueda (Note: In this Spanish name, the first or paternal surname is Ismael and the second or maternal family name is Salgueda.)
- Date of birth: 23 January 1999 (age 27)
- Place of birth: Ripoll, Spain
- Position: Midfielder

Senior career*
Years	Team	Apps	(Gls)
2015–2016	Espanyol	8	(0)
2019–2022	Barcelona B	32	(0)
2022–2023	Zaragoza CFF	26	(7)

International career^{‡}
2022–2023	Egypt	3	(2)
Partner	Auronplay (2024–2026)
Twitch information
Channel	saaraiismael
Years active	2025–present
Followers	78,429
Last updated: 23 January 2026
- * Club domestic league appearances and goals as of 13 May 2023 ‡ National team caps and goals as of 23 February 2023

Sara Ismael Mohamed (Egyptian Arabic: سارة اسماعيل محمد; born 23 January 1999) is an online streamer and former football and Queens League player. She streams on Twitch under her real name. Born in Spain, she played as a midfielder for the Egypt national team.

== Early life ==
Ismael was born on 23 January 1999 in Ripoll, Spain to an Egyptian father and a Spanish mother. She started playing football at the age of twelve.

== Club career ==
Ismael started her senior career with Spanish side Barcelona B, playing for the club during the Coronavirus pandemic. During the 2017/18 season, she suffered two injuries while playing for the club. While playing for the club, she was able to train with the first team of Barcelona.

Her career has been marked by injuries. In 2022, she signed for Spanish side Zaragoza CFF.

During the 2023/23 season, she was regarded as one of the highest performing players for the club.

== Queens League ==
Ismael was the first player to be selected in the Queens League draft. She was regarded as one of the players in the draft with the highest ability. She was picked by Aniquiladoras FC of Espe and Juan Guarnizo. In September 2023, she could not play in the third matchday of the Queens Cup due to having been called up for the Egypt national team, but the team would go on to claim its first title defeating Saiyans FC in the cup final, held on October 14 at the La Rosaleda Stadium in Málaga.

== International career ==
Through birth and descent, Ismael was eligible to represent Spain or Egypt internationally. After being called up by the former at youth levels, she played for the latter at seniors.

== Style of play ==
Ismael mainly operates as a midfielder and is known for her speed.

== Personal life ==
As of 21 December 2024, Ismael was in a relationship with Spanish YouTuber and Twitch streamer Raúl Álvarez Genes, known as AuronPlay. They broke up in 2026.

== Career statistics ==
No.	Date	Venue	Opponent	Score	Result	Competition
1.	19 February 2023	Fouad Chehab Stadium, Jounieh, Lebanon	Lebanon	1–0	2–1	Friendly
2.	22 February 2023	Fouad Chehab Stadium, Jounieh, Lebanon	Lebanon	1–0	2–1	Friendly
