= Récord (Mexican newspaper) =

Mexican daily sports newspaper

- Type: Sport website and newspaper
- Founded: 2002; 24 years ago
- Language: Spanish
- Website: www.record.com.mx

Récord is a Mexican daily sports newspaper. It follows a similar format as the Spanish newspaper Marca. Récord is owned by Notmusa.

It was founded by Carlos Flores Núñez in 2002.

== See also ==
- List of newspapers in Mexico
