= Seven-a-side football =

Team sport, variant of association football

- Highest governing body: IFA7; FIF7; FIFO7S (Americas)
- Nicknames: Football 7

Characteristics
- Contact: Yes
- Team members: 7 per side
- Type: Team sport, ball game
- Equipment: Football; Football boots Shin guards Kits; Goalkeeper gloves
- Venue: Football pitch

Presence
- Country or region: Worldwide
- Olympic: No
- Paralympic: No

Seven-a-side football or Football 7 is one of the small-sided variations of football, played among seven players in each team. In the game consists of one goalkeeper and six outfield players. The pitch of seven-a-side football is bigger than that of five-a-side football, ranging from 50-65 yards in length and 25-50 yards in width respectively.

Like other minifootball variations including five-a-side football, seven-a-side football is commonly played informally with flexible rules in contrast to association football and futsal, for which official laws are maintained by the IFAB and FIFA respectively. However, there have been many official and more formal seven-a-side matches in which the laws are often determined by the officiators and pre-existing rules.

Internationally, seven-a-side football is governed by several sub-continental governing bodies, including the IFA7 (recognized by FIFA), FIF7, and FIFO7S, with the versions sanctioned by these governing bodies have a similar set of rules. Other versions of seven-a-side football are sanctioned by multiple organisations and competitions, including the World Minifootball Federation and International Socca Federation, in which the variations of seven-a-side football are played as a part of WMF-sanctioned minifootball and ISF-sanctioned socca, Kings League and its women's counterpart Queens League, which uses additional rules such as tiebreaker penalty shootouts and secret weapons, The Soccer Tournament, a competition with additional rules, notably the Elam Ending, and a winner-take-all $1 million prize, and World Sevens Football, a women's international tournament.

== International competitions ==
=== National teams ===
==== Worldwide ====
- Kings World Cup Nations
- FIF7 World Cup
- IFA7 World Championship
- IFA7 Nations Cup
- F7 National Teams World Cup by F7IC

==== Intercontinental ====
- League of the Americas
- Recopa Sudamericana

==== Invitational tournaments ====
- IFA7 International Challenge

==== Central America ====
- Central America Cup

==== South America ====
- Copa América
- Copa Sudamericana
- IFA7 Copa America
- Pacific Cup

=== Clubs ===
==== Worldwide ====
- Football 7 World Club Championship
- IFA7 World Clubs Championship
- Kings World Cup Clubs
- Kings League
- Queens League

==== Intercontinental ====
- Kings League MENA

==== Invitational tournaments ====
- World Sevens Football

==== Asia ====
- Asia 7s

== Domestic competitions ==
=== Argentina ===
- Super Liga F7 Argentina

=== Brazil ===
- Kings League Brazil
- Futebol 7 Nordeste
- Liga Futebol 7 Brasil
- NATIONAL FUT7 LEAGUE
- RW Futebol 7
- Super League 7 Brazil
- Super Liga Alagoana Fut 7

=== Bulgaria ===
- Bulgaria Mini Football League / Мини Футболна Лига

=== Canada ===
- Soccer League F7 Canada

=== Costa Rica ===
- Costa Rica Campeonato Nacional
- Costa Rica Liga Nacional
- Liga Fút7 Costa Rica

=== England ===
- London 7-a-side Dream League
- PowerLeague 7-a-side Football League

=== France ===
- Kings League France

=== Germany ===
- Kings League Germany

=== Guatemala ===
- Liga Fut7 Guatemala

=== India ===
- Indian Football 7 League
- All India Sevens Football

=== Ireland ===
- F7 Spark Energy Soccer League - Dublin

=== Italy ===
- Kings League Italy

=== Japan ===
- Football 7 Society League

=== Malta ===
- Seven-a-side Football Alliance League (SFAL)

=== Mexico ===
- Kings League Mexico
- Liga Fut 7 MX
- Liga Futbol 7 Corpus Christi
- Liga Futbol 7 Soccer Tlalpan
- Super League 7 Mexico

=== Peru ===
- Super Liga Fútbol 7 Iquitos
- Torneo Nacional IFA7

=== Philippines ===
- 7's Football League

=== Portugal ===
- Superliga Nacional Futebol 7

=== Singapore ===
- SCC Soccer 7s

=== Spain ===
- Kings League Spain
- Ligas Fútbol 7 Para Todos Madrid
- Madrid Fútbol 7 Ligas
- Queens League Spain

=== Thailand ===
- Channel 7 Football Champion Cup

=== United States ===
- The Soccer Tournament

=== United Arab Emirates ===
- KEFA Sevens UAE

=== Uruguay ===
- Liga Uruguaya Fútbol 7

=== Vietnam ===
- Hanoi Premier League S7(HPL) (northern teams)
- Saigon Premier League S7(SPL) (southeast teams)
- Can Tho Premier League S7(CPL) (Mekong Delta teams)
- Dak Lak Premier League(DPL) (Central Highlands and Central Coast teams)
- Vietnam Premier League (VPL) (National Finals)

=== Wales ===
- Cardiff Minifootball League
