= 2025 Kings World Cup Nations =

Tournament details
- Host country: Italy
- Dates: 1 January 2025– 12 January 2025
- Teams: 16
- Venue: 2 (in 2 host cities)

Final positions
- Champions: Brazil (1st title)
- Runners-up: Colombia

Tournament statistics
- Matches played: 27
- Goals scored: 186 (6.89 per match)
- Top scorer: Kelvin Oliveira (19 goals)
- Best player: Kelvin Oliveira
- Best goalkeeper: Camilo Mena

The 2025 Kings World Cup Nations was an international seven-a-side football tournament based on the Kings League format created by Gerard Piqué and Ibai Llanos. Unlike the Kings World Cup launched in 2024, which is a club competition, this tournament saw players from the different versions of the Kings League forming teams to represent their respective nations, similar to the FIFA's World Cup.

== Background ==
Before the start of the 2024-2025 season, in an introductory video for the campaign uploaded on 7 September 2024. A second international tournament, the Kings World Cup Nations was announced, this time with players forming national teams to represent their countries. During the launch event for the Kings League Italy on 18 November 2024, it was confirmed that Italy would be hosting the tournament, held from 1 to 12 January 2025, with the finals taking place in Turin's Juventus Stadium.

== Format ==
The 2025 Kings World Cup Nations retains the format of the 2024 Kings World Cup tournament, which included features of a Swiss-system tournament but with only 16 teams.

First stage

- In the first round, the 16 teams each play one match, with the pairings decided by a random draw with no restrictions.
- All teams advance to the second round, with the teams that won their first-round match going to a 'winner bracket' and the teams that lost going to a 'loser bracket'.
- The winners of the 'winner bracket' in the second round advance to the knockout stage, while the losing teams will face the winning teams from the 'loser bracket' in a last-chance round. The winners of the last-chance round will secure the remaining places to the knockout stage.

Knockout stage

- The knockout phase then consist of a quarterfinals, semifinals and a final.

== Competing teams ==
As usual in the Kings League, each national team was chaired by a streamer or a football related personality.

Spain and Mexico, the countries that host the Kings League and the Américas Kings League, were the first two national teams confirmed.

Nation	Chairperson(s)	Date
Argentina	Sergio Agüero, Jero Freixas, Jose de Cabo and Jo Valicenti	21 October 2024
Brazil	Ricardo Leite (Kaká), Cris Guedes, Neymar da Silva, Allan Rodrigues (O Estagiário), Alexandre Borba Chiqueta (Gaules), Bruno Goes (Nobru), Lucio dos Santos (Cerol), Luan Kovarik (Jon Vlogs), Aliffe de Carvalho (Paulinho o Loko), Lucas Gagliasso (Luquet4), Nyvi Estephan, Victor Costa (Coringa), Ludmilla, Konrad Dantas (Kondzilla) and Michel	5 December 2024
Colombia	James Rodríguez, Juan Guarnizo, Luis Villa (Westcol), Angerson García (Pelicanger) and La Parce	21 October 2024
Germany	Mario Götze, Younes Zarou, Kevin Teller (Papaplatte) and Maximilian Stemmler (Trymacs)	2 December 2024
Italy	Gianmarco Tocco (Tumblurr), Emanuele Nocera (ManuuXO), Pier Francesco Gentili and Gabriele Gentili (PirlasV), Federico Lucia (Fedez), Luca Campolunghi, Antonio Pellegrino (ZW Jackson), Damiano Er Faina, Andrea Pirrera (En3rix), Alessandro Pagliari (KFrenezy), Samuel Afriyie (Off Samuel), Sergio Cruz Pereira, Mirko Virgilio (Mirko Cisco), Simone Buratti (GrenBaud) and Francesco Marzano (TheRealMarzaa)	18 November 2024
Japan	Junichi Kato	11 November 2024
Korea Republic	Lee Kang-in, Park Ji-sung, Kim In-jik (Gamst) and Kim Dong-jun (Jamm)	2 December 2024
Mexico	Alana Flores (AlanaLaRana), Natalia García (NataliaMX), Iván Navarrete (Pipepunk), Javier Hernández (Chicharito), Álex (Escorpión Dorado) and Gabriel Montiel (Werevertumorro) and Samantha Rivera (Samy Rivers)	30 September 2024
Morocco	Ilyas El Maliki	7 October 2024
Peru	Andy Merino (Zein)	19 November 2024
Saudi Arabia	Ahmed Alqahtani (SHoNgxBoNg)	21 October 2024
Spain	Iker Casillas, Adri Contreras, Gerard Romero, Jaume Cremades (Perxitaa), Ibai Llanos, Martí Miràs (Spursito), David Cánovas (TheGrefg), Mario Alonso (DjMaRiiO), Javier (xBuyer) and Eric Ruiz (MiniBuyer)	30 September 2024
Turkey	Tuğkan Gönültaş (Elraenn)	2 December 2024
Ukraine	Mykhailo Lebiha (Leb1ga)	2 December 2024
United States	Edwin Castro (Castro1021), Pitaa1021 and Jake Paul	5 December 2024
Uzbekistan	Islom Abdujabborov	5 December 2024

== Squads ==
Team squads

Note: Since this is the first tournament held with national teams under the Kings format, every player is considered as starting over with zero caps regardless of any prior association football or futsal career.

Argentina

Manager: Martín Posse

No.	Pos.	Player	Date of birth (age)	Caps	Goals	Club
1	GK	Marcelo Barovero	18 February 1984 (aged 40)	0	0	Free agent
2	DF	Ezequiel Cohen	10 March 1993 (aged 31)	0	0	Free agent
5	DF	Martín Mantovani	7 July 1984 (aged 40)	0	0	(Royal Spanish Football Federation) Saiyans FC
8	MF	Facu Navajas	1 January 1999 (aged 26)	0	0	Free agent
9	FW	Joaquín Giménez	13 August 2001 (aged 23)	0	0	Free agent
10	FW	Sergio Agüero	2 June 1988 (aged 36)	0	0	(Royal Spanish Football Federation) Kunisports
11	MF	Rubens Sambueza	1 January 1984 (aged 41)	0	0	(Royal Spanish Football Federation) PIO FC
16	MF	Franco Romero	1 January 1997 (aged 28)	0	0	Free agent
17	FW	Facu Romero	23 June 2004 (aged 20)	0	0	Free agent
18	MF	Rafael Joao	26 May 1994 (aged 30)	0	0	Free agent
20	MF	Pablo Gómez	16 July 1997 (aged 27)	0	0	(Argentine Football Association) Muchachos FC
23	GK	Luis Sánchez	4 July 1997 (aged 27)	0	0	Free agent
24	DF	Augusto Fernández	10 April 1986 (aged 38)	0	0	(Royal Spanish Football Federation) Saiyans FC

Brazil

Manager: Victor Taube

No.	Pos.	Player	Date of birth (age)	Caps	Goals	Club
3	DF	Wembley Luiz	15 August 1997 (aged 27)	0	0	(Brazilian Football Confederation) Furia FC
7	MF	Davi Ilario	29 March 2002 (aged 22)	0	0	Free agent
8	DF	Wellington Rodrigues	21 July 1997 (aged 27)	0	0	(Brazilian Football Confederation) G3X FC
9	FW	Kelvin Oliveira	15 August 1995 (aged 29)	0	0	(Royal Spanish Football Federation) Porcinos FC
10	MF	Andreas Vaz	18 May 1995 (aged 29)	0	0	(Royal Spanish Football Federation) Porcinos FC
11	FW	Leleti	21 June 1996 (aged 28)	0	0	(Brazilian Football Confederation) Furia FC
12	MF	Jefferson Melo	27 September 1995 (aged 29)	0	0	(Brazilian Football Confederation) Furia FC
13	DF	Maicon Silva	2 April 1998 (aged 26)	0	0	(Brazilian Football Confederation) G3X FC
14	FW	Lipão	11 December 1996 (aged 28)	0	0	(Brazilian Football Confederation) Furia FC
22	GK	João Pedro Isidório	22 February 2001 (aged 23)	0	0	(Brazilian Football Confederation) Furia FC
30	MF	Matheus Rufino	6 February 1998 (aged 26)	0	0	Free agent
31	FW	João Victor Assumpção	26 October 1999 (aged 25)	0	0	Free agent
98	GK	Josildo Barata	7 July 1998 (aged 26)	0	0	(Brazilian Football Confederation) G3X FC

Colombia

Manager: (Argentina) Sergio Verdirame

No.	Pos.	Player	Date of birth (age)	Caps	Goals	Club
2	DF	Denilson Lobón	15 March 1999 (aged 25)	0	0	(Dominican Football Federation) Galácticos del Caribe
4	DF	Luis Moreno	30 May 1995 (aged 29)	0	0	(Colombian Football Federation) Atlético Parceros
7	MF	Julio Perea	21 July 1996 (aged 28)	0	0	(Colombian Football Federation) Atlético Parceros
8	MF	Brihan Gutiérrez	2 December 1997 (aged 27)	0	0	(Colombian Football Federation) Atlético Parceros
10	FW	Angellot Caro	3 December 1988 (aged 36)	0	0	(Colombian Football Federation) Atlético Parceros
11	FW	Alejandro Ortega	28 March 2000 (aged 24)	0	0	(Colombian Football Federation) West Santos FC
12	GK	Camilo Mena	12 January 1999 (aged 25)	0	0	Free agent
16	FW	Jair Pérez	12 February 1994 (aged 30)	0	0	(Colombian Football Federation) Atlético Parceros
22	MF	Yair Arias	21 January 2000 (aged 24)	0	0	(Uruguayan Football Association) Raniza FC
23	MF	Axur Quintero	15 October 2003 (aged 21)	0	0	(Uruguayan Football Association) Raniza FC
24	DF	Jhon Palacios	3 July 2001 (aged 23)	0	0	(Colombian Football Federation) West Santos FC
80	MF	Alexander Rodríguez	27 February 2000 (aged 24)	0	0	(Colombian Football Federation) West Santos FC
91	GK	Yovan Cárdenas	11 January 1991 (aged 33)	0	0	(Colombian Football Federation) Atlético Parceros

Germany

Manager: (Montenegro) Damir Agovic

No.	Pos.	Player	Date of birth (age)	Caps	Goals	Club
1	GK	Fabio Rasic	6 September 2002 (aged 22)	0	0	Free agent
7	MF	Nick Salihamidžić	8 February 2003 (aged 21)	0	0	Free agent
8	DF	Max Dombrowka	24 March 1992 (aged 32)	0	0	(German Football Association) Youniors FC
9	FW	Pascal Sohm	2 November 1991 (aged 33)	0	0	Free agent
10	MF	Moritz Leitner	8 December 1992 (aged 32)	0	0	Free agent
11	MF	Nedzad Plavci	4 November 1988 (aged 36)	0	0	Free agent
16	MF	Daniel Muteba	16 December 1999 (aged 25)	0	0	Free agent
18	GK	Abdoulaye Gueye	11 August 2003 (aged 21)	0	0	Free agent
19	FW	Noah Jones	18 March 2002 (aged 22)	0	0	Free agent
23	DF	Vendim Sinani	28 February 1994 (aged 30)	0	0	Free agent
25	DF	Anthony Manuba	25 July 1997 (aged 27)	0	0	Free agent
28	DF	Herbert Paul	12 July 2003 (aged 21)	0	0	Free agent
96	MF	Denis Hoxha	25 July 1997 (aged 27)	0	0	Free agent

Italy

Manager: Mauro Micheli

No.	Pos.	Player	Date of birth (age)	Caps	Goals	Club
1	GK	Emiliano Viviano	1 December 1985 (aged 39)	0	0	(Italian Football Federation) FC Caesar
2	DF	Riccardo Nava	8 April 2004 (aged 20)	0	0	(Italian Football Federation) Punchers FC
3	DF	Vlad Marin	15 May 1995 (aged 29)	0	0	(Italian Football Federation) Alpak FC
4	DF	Andrea Tarasco	22 September 2000 (aged 24)	0	0	(Italian Football Federation) Zebras FC
5	MF	Riccardo Frosio	14 October 2004 (aged 20)	0	0	(Italian Football Federation) Stallions
6	MF	Domenico Rossi	9 May 2000 (aged 24)	0	0	(Italian Football Federation) Alpak FC
7	FW	Sergio Cruz	22 August 1988 (aged 36)	0	0	(Italian Football Federation) Black Lotus FC
8	MF	Alessandro Gelsi	7 October 1997 (aged 27)	0	0	(Italian Football Federation) Gear7 FC
9	FW	Michele Trombetta	3 August 1994 (aged 30)	0	0	Free agent
10	FW	Francesco Caputo	6 August 1987 (aged 37)	0	0	(Italian Football Federation) TRM FC
11	FW	Yassin Fares	19 March 1998 (aged 26)	0	0	(Italian Football Federation) Black Lotus FC
12	GK	Justyn D'Ippolito	14 August 1998 (aged 26)	0	0	(Italian Football Federation) Boomers
19	DF	Leonardo Bonucci	1 May 1987 (aged 37)	0	0	Free agent

Japan

Manager: Kensuke Nakai

No.	Pos.	Player	Date of birth (age)	Caps	Goals	Club
1	GK	Keisuke Fukaya	20 June 1998 (aged 26)	0	0	(Japan Football Association) Murash FC
2	DF	Kento Umetani	24 October 1993 (aged 31)	0	0	Free agent
7	MF	Shohei Agata	25 May 1994 (aged 30)	0	0	Free agent
8	MF	Ryohei Oda	3 March 2000 (aged 24)	0	0	(Japan Football Association) Murash FC
9	FW	Ryota Fukuhara	7 August 1998 (aged 26)	0	0	Free agent
10	DF	Koujiro Kanetake	1 June 1991 (aged 33)	0	0	(Japan Football Association) Murash FC
14	DF	Itsuki Yamada	5 October 1990 (aged 34)	0	0	(Japan Football Association) Murash FC
17	MF	Shohei Moriyasu	17 August 1991 (aged 33)	0	0	(Japan Football Association) Murash FC
18	MF	Ao Kishimoto	30 May 1995 (aged 29)	0	0	(Royal Spanish Football Federation) Rayo de Barcelona
19	FW	Takaharu Nakagawa	31 October 1991 (aged 33)	0	0	Free agent
22	GK	Yusei Narita	29 December 1999 (aged 25)	0	0	(Japan Football Association) Murash FC
26	MF	Kensuke Enjo	23 August 1993 (aged 31)	0	0	(Japan Football Association) Murash FC
74	MF	Shunsuke Nakamura	16 May 1994 (aged 30)	0	0	Free agent

Korea Republic

Manager: Hong Moon

No.	Pos.	Player	Date of birth (age)	Caps	Goals	Club
1	GK	Lee Bum-young	2 April 1989 (aged 35)	0	0	Free agent
4	DF	Kang Min-soo	14 February 1986 (aged 38)	0	0	Free agent
6	MF	Kim Dong-cheol	1 October 1990 (aged 34)	0	0	Free agent
10	FW	Park Eun-kang	20 September 1995 (aged 29)	0	0	Free agent
11	FW	Lee Jung-jin	23 December 1993 (aged 31)	0	0	Free agent
14	DF	Hwang Do-yeon	27 February 1991 (aged 33)	0	0	Free agent
16	MF	Lee Jeoung-geun	22 April 1994 (aged 30)	0	0	Free agent
17	FW	Cho Young-cheol	31 May 1989 (aged 35)	0	0	Free agent
18	FW	Kim Hyun-sung	27 September 1989 (aged 35)	0	0	Free agent
20	MF	Lee Ho	22 October 1984 (aged 40)	0	0	Free agent
21	MF	Min Kyung-hyun	4 May 1998 (aged 26)	0	0	Free agent
30	DF	Shin Se-gye	16 September 1990 (aged 34)	0	0	Free agent
99	GK	Oh Ji-hun	4 February 1996 (aged 28)	0	0	Free agent

Mexico

Manager: Severo Meza

No.	Pos.	Player	Date of birth (age)	Caps	Goals	Club
1	GK	Antonio Monterde	16 December 1997 (aged 27)	0	0	(Peruvian Football Federation) Persas FC
2	DF	César Bernal	14 February 1995 (aged 29)	0	0	(Dominican Football Federation) Galácticos del Caribe
5	DF	Martín Rodríguez	18 May 1998 (aged 26)	0	0	(Football Federation of Chile) Real Titán
7	FW	Brayan Hernández	14 September 2000 (aged 24)	0	0	(Dominican Football Federation) Galácticos del Caribe
9	FW	Baruc Ochoa	13 July 2001 (aged 23)	0	0	(Uruguayan Football Association) Raniza FC
10	MF	Jesús Pérez	21 January 1997 (aged 27)	0	0	(Mexican Football Federation) Olimpo United
11	FW	Daviz Junco	17 August 2000 (aged 24)	0	0	(Dominican Football Federation) Galácticos del Caribe
17	DF	Érik Vera	24 March 1992 (aged 32)	0	0	(Argentine Football Association) Muchachos FC
19	MF	Jacob Morales	22 March 1999 (aged 25)	0	0	(Mexican Football Federation) Olimpo United
20	FW	Obed Martínez	30 March 1996 (aged 28)	0	0	(Peruvian Football Federation) Persas FC
22	MF	Juan Cisneros	6 May 1998 (aged 26)	0	0	(Peruvian Football Federation) Persas FC
23	GK	Hugo Murga	19 October 1999 (aged 25)	0	0	(Uruguayan Football Association) Raniza FC
77	FW	Diego Martínez	22 September 1988 (aged 36)	0	0	(Argentine Football Association) Muchachos FC

Morocco

Manager: Majid El Khal

No.	Pos.	Player	Date of birth (age)	Caps	Goals	Club
1	GK	Amine El Bourkadi	22 February 1985 (aged 39)	0	0	Free agent
2	MF	Achraf Saoud	21 June 1990 (aged 34)	0	0	Free agent
3	DF	Nadir Louah	29 May 2003 (aged 21)	0	0	(Royal Spanish Football Federation) Porcinos FC
7	FW	Zakaria Hadraf	12 March 1990 (aged 34)	0	0	Free agent
10	FW	Mehdi Amri	19 November 2003 (aged 21)	0	0	Free agent
11	FW	Said Elaouny	1 June 1993 (aged 31)	0	0	Free agent
14	MF	Mbark Boussoufa	15 August 1984 (aged 40)	0	0	Free agent
16	DF	Mohamed Nahiri	22 October 1991 (aged 33)	0	0	Free agent
17	DF	Nabil Dirar	25 February 1986 (aged 38)	0	0	Free agent
67	MF	Ilyas Nasri	4 April 1997 (aged 27)	0	0	Free agent
80	FW	Fuad El Amrani	30 November 2001 (aged 23)	0	0	(Royal Spanish Football Federation) xBuyer Team
93	GK	Marouane Mzirira	15 September 1990 (aged 34)	0	0	Free agent
99	DF	Issam Erraki	5 January 1981 (aged 43)	0	0	Free agent

Peru

Manager: (Mexico) Víctor Chaires

No.	Pos.	Player	Date of birth (age)	Caps	Goals	Club
1	GK	Walter Brousset	24 March 1994 (aged 30)	0	0	Free agent
4	MF	Juan José Malache	19 December 1993 (aged 31)	0	0	Free agent
6	MF	Santiago Mallaupoma	11 May 1996 (aged 28)	0	0	Free agent
8	DF	Jimy Bustos	13 September 1987 (aged 37)	0	0	Free agent
9	FW	Franco Colan	21 November 1990 (aged 34)	0	0	Free agent
10	MF	Ibán Gálvez	18 August 1995 (aged 29)	0	0	Free agent
11	MF	Denilson Zegarra	6 October 2005 (aged 19)	0	0	Free agent
14	DF	Paulo Herrera	13 November 1991 (aged 33)	0	0	Free agent
16	DF	Yovanny Portilla	4 July 1992 (aged 32)	0	0	Free agent
17	GK	Martín Vega	20 June 1997 (aged 27)	0	0	Free agent
21	MF	Jesús Honores	30 March 1988 (aged 36)	0	0	Free agent
28	MF	Fabricio Paredes	29 July 1999 (aged 25)	0	0	(Italian Football Federation) Underdogs FC
86	FW	Toni Alvarado	17 June 1986 (aged 38)	0	0	(Peruvian Football Federation) Persas FC

Saudi Arabia

Manager: Abdullah Al-Shehri

No.	Pos.	Player	Date of birth (age)	Caps	Goals	Club
5	MF	Fahad Hamad	23 November 1989 (aged 35)	0	0	Free agent
10	MF	Omar Abdulrahman	20 September 1991 (aged 33)	0	0	Free agent
12	GK	Mohammed Ahmed	21 June 1990 (aged 34)	0	0	(Saudi Arabian Football Federation) SXB FC
15	FW	Rabee Sufyani	26 January 1987 (aged 37)	0	0	Free agent
16	MF	Abdullah Al-Mutairi	1 July 1987 (aged 37)	0	0	Free agent
19	MF	Talal Saleem	29 July 2004 (aged 20)	0	0	Free agent
22	GK	Abdulrahman Aldahhan	26 October 2001 (aged 23)	0	0	Free agent
24	MF	Ahmed Faqihy	29 December 1989 (aged 35)	0	0	Free agent
47	DF	Fares Almaleh	14 November 1994 (aged 30)	0	0	Free agent
49	FW	Anas Alomari	20 August 2002 (aged 22)	0	0	Free agent
66	DF	Mohammed Abousaban	20 January 1990 (aged 34)	0	0	Free agent

Spain

Manager: Daniel Romo

No.	Pos.	Player	Date of birth (age)	Caps	Goals	Club
1	GK	Víctor Vidal	14 November 1999 (aged 25)	0	0	(Royal Spanish Football Federation) Ultimate Móstoles
6	MF	Marc Pelaz	19 September 2003 (aged 21)	0	0	(Royal Spanish Football Federation) Jijantes FC
7	FW	Nico Santos	7 February 2000 (aged 24)	0	0	(Royal Spanish Football Federation) Porcinos FC
8	MF	Javier Espinosa	19 September 1992 (aged 32)	0	0	(Royal Spanish Football Federation) Aniquiladores FC
9	MF	Gilles Vidal	26 October 2002 (aged 22)	0	0	(Royal Spanish Football Federation) El Barrio
10	MF	Cristian Ubón	23 April 2001 (aged 23)	0	0	(Royal Spanish Football Federation) Ultimate Móstoles
11	MF	Pablo Beguer	30 January 1995 (aged 29)	0	0	(Royal Spanish Football Federation) Jijantes FC
16	DF	Àlex Gutiérrez	11 March 1994 (aged 30)	0	0	(Royal Spanish Football Federation) Porcinos FC
17	MF	Aitor Vives	6 August 1998 (aged 26)	0	0	(Royal Spanish Football Federation) Los Troncos FC
21	DF	Diego de la Mata	3 March 1993 (aged 31)	0	0	(Royal Spanish Football Federation) Ultimate Móstoles
24	DF	Alberto de la Bella	2 December 1985 (aged 39)	0	0	(Royal Spanish Football Federation) Ultimate Móstoles
25	GK	Dani Pérez	7 October 1998 (aged 26)	0	0	(Royal Spanish Football Federation) Saiyans FC
77	FW	Aridai Cabrera	26 September 1988 (aged 36)	0	0	(Royal Spanish Football Federation) PIO FC

Turkey

Manager: Burak Kaymak

No.	Pos.	Player	Date of birth (age)	Caps	Goals	Club
1	GK	Tugay Akbakla	20 December 1996 (aged 28)	0	0	Free agent
5	DF	Ibrahim Kalenci	1 January 1992 (aged 33)	0	0	Free agent
7	MF	Berk Kıratlı	23 May 1995 (aged 29)	0	0	(Turkish Football Federation) Limon FC
10	MF	Amar Cekić	21 December 1992 (aged 32)	0	0	Free agent
11	FW	Aytürk Geçim	25 November 1995 (aged 29)	0	0	Free agent
15	MF	Enes Küc	28 November 1996 (aged 28)	0	0	Free agent
16	DF	Onur Sağlam	23 March 1993 (aged 31)	0	0	Free agent
24	MF	Furkan Ars	5 January 1994 (aged 30)	0	0	Free agent
29	MF	Berke Onuk	3 August 2002 (aged 22)	0	0	(Turkish Football Federation) Limon FC
39	DF	Memos Sözer	18 October 1994 (aged 30)	0	0	(Turkish Football Federation) Limon FC
55	GK	Oktay Kazan	23 October 1998 (aged 26)	0	0	Free agent
61	MF	Suad Ak	6 July 2002 (aged 22)	0	0	(German Football Association) Youniors FC
94	MF	Osman Ural	25 August 1994 (aged 30)	0	0	(Turkish Football Federation) Limon FC

Ukraine

Manager: Valeriy Fedorchuk

No.	Pos.	Player	Date of birth (age)	Caps	Goals	Club
3	DF	Andriy Zagranychnyi	13 December 1994 (aged 30)	0	0	Free agent
7	MF	Denys Sandetsky	23 March 1989 (aged 35)	0	0	Free agent
10	MF	Yevhen Konoplyanka	29 September 1989 (aged 35)	0	0	(Ukrainian Association of Football) UA Steel
11	MF	Denys Oliynyk	16 June 1987 (aged 37)	0	0	Free agent
17	MF	Vitaliy Melnyk	15 December 1986 (aged 38)	0	0	Free agent
21	MF	Andriy Tsopa	14 September 2001 (aged 23)	0	0	Free agent
23	DF	Yehor Halkin	19 May 1994 (aged 30)	0	0	Free agent
27	FW	Denys Tokar	27 September 1994 (aged 30)	0	0	Free agent
33	DF	Ivan Karapinka	6 July 1991 (aged 33)	0	0	Free agent
71	GK	Denys Boyko	29 January 1988 (aged 36)	0	0	Free agent
79	GK	Yuriy Pankiv	3 November 1984 (aged 40)	0	0	Free agent
94	FW	Júnior Moraes	4 April 1987 (aged 37)	0	0	(Ukrainian Association of Football) UA Steel
99	DF	Mykola Morozyuk	17 January 1988 (aged 36)	0	0	(Ukrainian Association of Football) UA Steel

United States

Manager: Dillion Vedral

No.	Pos.	Player	Date of birth (age)	Caps	Goals	Club
1	GK	Eduardo Cortés	21 August 1993 (aged 31)	0	0	Free agent
7	MF	Juanito Ramírez	30 January 1998 (aged 26)	0	0	Free agent
8	MF	Nicky Hernández	21 September 1998 (aged 26)	0	0	Free agent
10	DF	René García	28 April 1987 (aged 37)	0	0	Free agent
12	MF	Stephen González	7 October 1997 (aged 27)	0	0	Free agent
15	FW	Luís Morales	23 October 1999 (aged 25)	0	0	Free agent
17	DF	Danny Benítez	16 August 1997 (aged 27)	0	0	Free agent
18	DF	Erik Macías	21 September 1996 (aged 28)	0	0	Free agent
20	FW	VcMor Eligwe	5 May 1991 (aged 33)	0	0	Free agent
24	DF	Stefan Mijatovic	5 May 1996 (aged 28)	0	0	Free agent
31	MF	David Ortiz	20 September 2000 (aged 24)	0	0	Free agent
58	GK	Raúl Torrez	10 May 2001 (aged 23)	0	0	Free agent
98	FW	Devin Vega	11 December 1998 (aged 26)	0	0	Free agent

Uzbekistan

Manager: Sardor Nishanbaev

No.	Pos.	Player	Date of birth (age)	Caps	Goals	Club
1	GK	Timur Golikov	31 July 1996 (aged 28)	0	0	Free agent
5	DF	Lazizbek Saidov	26 January 2001 (aged 23)	0	0	Free agent
9	FW	Shakhriyor Dzhabborov	14 January 2003 (aged 21)	0	0	Free agent
10	MF	Javlonbek Anvarjonov	4 October 2000 (aged 24)	0	0	Free agent
11	FW	Khushnudbek Rakhmonov	10 October 2000 (aged 24)	0	0	Free agent
14	MF	Karen Muratbayev	21 July 1997 (aged 27)	0	0	Free agent
17	GK	Radion Yangirov	13 August 1999 (aged 25)	0	0	Free agent
20	DF	Jonibek Abdugafforov	8 September 2001 (aged 23)	0	0	Free agent
23	DF	Jasurbek Tukhtasinov	23 December 2002 (aged 22)	0	0	Free agent
69	DF	Elkhan Akhmedov	11 September 1999 (aged 25)	0	0	Free agent
77	FW	Jakhongir Israilov	30 December 2002 (aged 22)	0	0	Free agent
88	MF	Mukhammadali Mansurov	16 July 2002 (aged 22)	0	0	Free agent
97	MF	Farrukh Dadajonov	20 January 1997 (aged 27)	0	0	Free agent

== Broadcast ==
The entire tournament was livestreamed on Twitch, YouTube and Kick, both from the official Kings League channels and individual feeds from the teams' chairpersons.

== First Stage ==
=== First round ===
Pairings for the first round were drawn on 5 December 2024.

Team 1	Score	Team 2
Argentina	4–2	Spain
Japan	3–1	Italy
United States	4–2	Mexico
Uzbekistan	4–3	Saudi Arabia
Peru	2–4	Germany
Brazil	7–4	(South Korea) Korea Republic
Turkey	5–0	Ukraine
Colombia	4–1	Morocco

1 January 2025 First round A	Argentina	4–2	Spain	Milan
18:00	Sánchez 9'; Gómez 19', 36' (pen.); Fr. Romero (yellow card) 25'; Fa. Romero 26'	Report	De la Mata 20+1'; Gutiérrez (yellow card) 25'; TheGrefg 38' (pp)	Stadium: Centro Sportivo Peppino Vismara; MVP: Pablo Gómez

1 January 2025 First round B	Japan	3–1	Italy	Milan
16:00	Nakamura 13'; Fukaya 19'; Agata 37'; Oda (red card) 39'	Report	Blur 35' (pp)	Stadium: Centro Sportivo Peppino Vismara; MVP: Shunsuke Nakamura

1 January 2025 First round C	United States	4–2	Mexico	Milan
19:00	Vega 3'; Ramírez 20'; Castro 22' (pp); Morales 38' (pen.)	Report	O. Martínez 1'; D. Martínez 38' (pen.)	Stadium: Centro Sportivo Peppino Vismara; MVP: Devin Vega

1 January 2025 First round D	Uzbekistan	4–3 (g.g.)	Saudi Arabia	Milan
17:00	Yangirov 19'; Dzhabborov 29' 40+1'; Abdujabborov 31' (pp)	Report	Hamad 13'; Sufyani 36'; Abousaban 38' (pen.)	Stadium: Centro Sportivo Peppino Vismara; MVP: Omar Abdulrahman

2 January 2025 First round E	Peru	2–4	Germany	Milan
19:00	Zein 28' (pp); Portilla 32' (pen.)	Report	Leitner 28' (pen.), 28' (pen.); Salihamidžić 30'; Dombrowka 34'	Stadium: Centro Sportivo Peppino Vismara; MVP: Moritz Leitner

2 January 2025 First round F	Brazil	7–4	Korea Republic	Milan
16:00	Melo 26'; Oliveira 28' (x2), 39' (x2); Leleti 34'; Gaules 38' (pp)	Report	Lee Ho (yellow card) 23' (goal) 40' (x2); Kim Hyun-sung 29' (x2)	Stadium: Centro Sportivo Peppino Vismara; MVP: Kelvin Oliveira

2 January 2025 First round G	Turkey	5–0	Ukraine	Milan
17:00	Ak 21', 24', 36' (pen.), 40+2' (x2)	Report	Melnyk (yellow card) 40'	Stadium: Centro Sportivo Peppino Vismara; MVP: Suad Ak

2 January 2025 First round H	Colombia	4–1	Morocco	Milan
18:00	Gutiérrez 4' (yellow card) 25'; Moreno (yellow card) 6' (yellow-red card) 40+3'; Perea 20'; Ortega 20+1'; Pelicanger 21' (pp)	Report	El Amrani 23'; Louah (yellow card) 32'	Stadium: Centro Sportivo Peppino Vismara; MVP: Camilo Mena

=== Second round ===
In the winners bracket, winners advance directly to the quarterfinals, losers go to the last-chance round. And in the losers bracket, winners go to the last-chance round, losers are eliminated.

==== Winners' bracket ====
Team 1	Score	Team 2
Argentina	2–1	Japan
United States	6–2	Uzbekistan
Germany	2–9	Brazil
Turkey	2–3	Colombia

==== Losers' bracket ====
Team 1	Score	Team 2
Spain	8–5	Italy
Mexico	8–4	Saudi Arabia
Peru	4–3	(South Korea) Korea Republic
Ukraine	2–9	Morocco

3 January 2025 Second round 1	Argentina	2–1	Japan	Milan
16:00	Fernández 9'; Navajas 15'	Report	Kato 30' (pp)	Stadium: Centro Sportivo Peppino Vismara; MVP: Facu Navajas

3 January 2025 Second round 2	United States	6–2	Uzbekistan	Milan
18:00	Ramírez 2'; Cortés 2'; Morales 5', 20+1', 38' (pen.); Ortiz 31'	Report	Yangirov (yellow card) 1'; Dzhabborov 24'; Abdujabborov 25' (pp)	Stadium: Centro Sportivo Peppino Vismara; MVP: Shakhriyor Dzhabborov

4 January 2025 Second round 3	Germany	2–9	Brazil	Milan
16:00	Jones 1'; Sohm 36'; Leitner (yellow card) 40+3'	Report	Vaz 3'; Guedes 16' (pp); Assumpção 24'; Oliveira 29' (pen.), 30', 40' (x2); Ilario 40+4' (x2)	Stadium: Centro Sportivo Peppino Vismara; MVP: Kelvin Oliveira

4 January 2025 Second round 4	Turkey	2–3 (g.g.)	Colombia	Milan
18:00	Geçim 19'; Sözer 30' (pen.)	Report	Ortega 33' 39'; Lobón 35' (pen.)	Stadium: Centro Sportivo Peppino Vismara; MVP: Camilo Mena

3 January 2025 Second round 5	Spain	8–5	Italy	Milan
17:00	Gutiérrez 1' (pen.), 4', 20+1'; MiniBuyer 18' (pp); G. Vidal 20'; Santos 22' de la Mata (yellow card) 24' (yellow-red card) 37'; Espinosa 40+3' (x2)	Report	Rossi 20+2', 24', 39' (x2); Cruz (yellow card) 21'; Blur 22' (pp); Viviano (yellow card) 25'	Stadium: Centro Sportivo Peppino Vismara; MVP: Àlex Gutiérrez

3 January 2025 Second round 6	Mexico	8–4	Saudi Arabia	Milan
19:00	O. Martínez 1', 20', 23', 36' (pen.); Pérez 6'; Hernández 20+1'; G. Montiel 24' (pp); Ochoa 38'	Report	Bernal 16' (o.g.); Al-Mutairi 25' (pen.); Abdulrahman 29', 38' (pen.)	Stadium: Centro Sportivo Peppino Vismara; MVP: Obed Martínez

4 January 2025 Second round 7	Peru	4–3	Korea Republic	Milan
17:00	Gálvez 8', 33'; Colan 28'; Honores 38'	Report	Gamst 28' (pp); Min Kyung-hyun 40+1' (x2)	Stadium: Centro Sportivo Peppino Vismara; MVP: Ibán Gálvez

4 January 2025 Second round 8	Ukraine	2–9	Morocco	Milan
19:00	Oliynyk 20+1'; Tsopa 33'; Zagranychnyi (yellow card) 34'	Report	Louah 1', 20', 20+1', 39' (x2); Hadraf 27'; Nasri (yellow card) 36'; Saoud 37'; Amri 40+1' (x2)	Stadium: Centro Sportivo Peppino Vismara; MVP: Nadir Louah

=== Last-chance round ===
Winners advance to the quarterfinals, losers are eliminated.

Team 1	Score	Team 2
Japan	2–4	Morocco
Uzbekistan	5–4	Peru
Germany	3–6	Mexico
Turkey	3–2	Spain

6 January 2025 Last-chance 1	Japan	2–4	Morocco	Milan
18:00	Enjo 20'; Kato 38' (pp)	Report	Erraki 3'; Louah 15', 20'; El Amrani 24'	Stadium: Centro Sportivo Peppino Vismara; MVP: Kensuke Enjo

7 January 2025 Last-chance 2	Uzbekistan	5–4	Peru	Milan
18:00	Dzhabborov 1', 3'; Anvarjonov 2'; Tukhtasinov 40+2' (x2)	Report	Alvarado 35'; Gálvez 37', 40' (x2)	Stadium: Centro Sportivo Peppino Vismara; MVP: Toni Alvarado

7 January 2025 Last-chance 3	Germany	3–6	Mexico	Milan
19:00	Salihamidžić 2'; Jones (yellow card) 34'; Sohm 40' (x2); Leitner (yellow card) 40+3'	Report	Monterde 2'; Bernal 13'; O. Martínez 20' (pen.), 39' (x2); Cisneros 20+1'; Pérez (yellow card) 39'; Vera (yellow card) 40+3'	Stadium: Centro Sportivo Peppino Vismara; MVP: Obed Martínez

6 January 2025 Last-chance 4	Turkey	3–2	Spain	Milan
19:00	Kazan 2'; Geçim 35' (pen.); Kıratlı 38'	Report	Contreras 26' (pp); Cabrera 37'	Stadium: Centro Sportivo Peppino Vismara; MVP: Oktay Kazan

== Knockout stage ==
Qualified teams

Team	Qualified via
Argentina	Winners' Bracket
United States	Winners' Bracket
Brazil	Winners' Bracket
Colombia	Winners' Bracket
Morocco	Last-chance round
Uzbekistan	Last-chance round
Mexico	Last-chance round
Turkey	Last-chance round

Quarter-final pairings were drawn on 6 January, before the start of the last-chance round.

Quarter-finals (8-9 January – Milan)
United States	7 (1)
Morocco (p)	7 (2)
Colombia	6
Uzbekistan	1
Argentina	2 (3)
Mexico (p)	2 (4)
Brazil	12
Turkey	4

Semi-finals (10 January – Milan)
Morocco	1
Colombia	2
Mexico	1
Brazil	3

Final (12 January – Turin)
Colombia	2
Brazil	6

=== Quarter-finals ===
8 January 2025 QF 1	United States	7–7 (1–2 p)	Morocco	Milan
19:00	Vega 2'; Cortés 2', 19'; Morales 8' (pen.); Benítez 20+1', 31'; Castro 23' (pp)	Report	Louah 1', 39' (x2); Erraki 9' (yellow card) 16'; El Amrani 22' (pen.), 33' (pen.); Saoud 26'; Amri (yellow card) 35'	Stadium: Centro Sportivo Peppino Vismara; MVP: Nadir Louah
	Penalties
	Ortiz (penalty missed); Mijatovic (penalty missed); Morales (penalty scored); Benítez (penalty missed); Hernández (penalty missed)		(penalty scored) El Amrani; (penalty missed) Louah; (penalty missed) Erraki; (penalty scored) Boussoufa; (penalty missed) Saoud

8 January 2025 QF 2	Colombia	6–1	Uzbekistan	Milan
18:00	Palacios 2'; Mena 3'; Gutiérrez 6'; Ortega 9'; Quintero 40' (x2)	Report	Anvarjonov 30'; Mansurov (yellow card) 32'; Saidov (yellow card) 39'	Stadium: Centro Sportivo Peppino Vismara; MVP: Camilo Mena

9 January 2025 QF 3	Argentina	2–2 (3–4 p)	Mexico	Milan
19:00	Cohen (yellow card) 2'; Gómez 20'; Agüero 27' (pen.)	Report	O. Martínez 3'; G. Montiel 27' (pp)	Stadium: Centro Sportivo Peppino Vismara; MVP: Obed Martínez
	Penalties
	Gómez (penalty scored); Fa. Romero (penalty scored); Mantovani (penalty missed); Sambueza (penalty scored); Joao (penalty missed)		(penalty scored) Pérez; (penalty scored) D. Martínez; (penalty scored) Cisneros; (penalty scored) Morales

9 January 2025 QF 4	Brazil	12–4	Turkey	Milan
18:00	Oliveira 1', 2', 20', 20+1', 30' (pen.), 40+2' (x2); Vaz 3'; Rodrigues 15'; O Estagiário 16' (pp); Leleti 26'; Rufino 32'	Report	Sözer 19' (yellow card) 40'; Geçim 24' (pen.), 35' (pen.), 37'	Stadium: Centro Sportivo Peppino Vismara; MVP: Kelvin Oliveira

=== Semi-finals ===
10 January 2025 SF 1	Morocco	1–2	Colombia	Milan
18:00	Louah 3'; Boussoufa (yellow card) 40+3'; Saoud (yellow card) 40+3'	Report	Perea 7'; Caro 19'; Rodríguez (yellow card) 37'	Stadium: Centro Sportivo Peppino Vismara; MVP: Angellot Caro

10 January 2025 SF 2	Mexico	1–3	Brazil	Milan
19:00	G. Montiel 26' (pp); Monterde (yellow card) 37'	Report	Oliveira 20', 28' (pen.), 37' (pen.)	Stadium: Centro Sportivo Peppino Vismara; MVP: Kelvin Oliveira

=== Final ===
12 January 2025 Final	Colombia	2–6	Brazil	Turin
18:20	Caro 20+2'; Pelicanger 21' (pp); Rodríguez (yellow card) 36'	Report	Oliveira 20', 25', 31' (pen.), 38' (pen.), 40+2' (x2); Vaz (yellow card) 36'	Stadium: Juventus Stadium; MVP: Kelvin Oliveira

2025 Kings World Cup Nations champions

Brazil
First title

== Goalscorers ==
There were 186 goals scored in 27 matches, for an average of 6.89 goals per match.

Goals that were worth double due to secret cards or double-goal time will be counted as one goal for the goalscoring statistics.

19 goals

- (Brazil national football team) Kelvin Oliveira

9 goals

- (Morocco national football team) Nadir Louah

8 goals

- (Mexico national football team) Obed Martínez

5 goals

- (Turkey national football team) Aytürk Geçim
- (United States men's national soccer team) Luís Morales
- (Uzbekistan national football team) Shakhriyor Dzhabborov

4 goals

- (Colombia national football team) Alejandro Ortega
- (Morocco national football team) Fuad El Amrani
- (Peru national football team) Ibán Gálvez
- (Turkey national football team) Suad Ak

3 goals

- (Argentina national football team) Pablo Gómez
- (Italy national football team) Domenico Rossi
- (Mexico national football team) Gabriel Montiel (pp)
- (Spain national football team) Àlex Gutiérrez
- (United States men's national soccer team) Eduardo Cortés

2 goals

- (Brazil national football team) Davi Ilario
- (Brazil national football team) Leleti
- (Brazil national football team) Andreas Vaz
- (Colombia national football team) Angellot Caro
- (Colombia national football team) Brihan Gutiérrez
- (Colombia national football team) Julio Perea
- (Colombia national football team) Pelicanger (pp)
- (Germany national football team) Moritz Leitner
- (Germany national football team) Nick Salihamidžić
- (Germany national football team) Pascal Sohm
- (Italy national football team) Blur (pp)
- (Japan national football team) Junichi Kato (pp)
- (Morocco national football team) Issam Erraki
- (Morocco national football team) Achraf Saoud
- (Saudi Arabia national football team) Omar Abdulrahman
- (Turkey national football team) Memos Sözer
- (United States men's national soccer team) Danny Benítez
- (United States men's national soccer team) Juanito Ramírez
- (United States men's national soccer team) Devin Vega
- (United States men's national soccer team) Castro (pp)
- (Uzbekistan national football team) Javlonbek Anvarjonov
- (Uzbekistan national football team) Islom Abdujabborov (pp)

1 goal

- (Argentina national football team) Sergio Agüero
- (Argentina national football team) Augusto Fernández
- (Argentina national football team) Facu Navajas
- (Argentina national football team) Facu Romero
- (Argentina national football team) Luis Sánchez
- (Brazil national football team) Joao Victor Assumpção
- (Brazil national football team) Jefferson Melo
- (Brazil national football team) Wellington Rodrigues
- (Brazil national football team) Matheus Rufino
- (Brazil national football team) O Estagiário (pp)
- (Brazil national football team) Gaules (pp)
- (Brazil national football team) Cris Guedes (pp)
- (Colombia national football team) Denilson Lobón
- (Colombia national football team) Camilo Mena
- (Colombia national football team) Jhon Palacios
- (Colombia national football team) Axur Quintero
- (Germany national football team) Max Dombrowka
- (Germany national football team) Noah Jones
- (Japan national football team) Shohei Agata
- (Japan national football team) Kensuke Enjo
- (Japan national football team) Keisuke Fukaya
- (Japan national football team) Shunsuke Nakamura
- (South Korea national football team) Kim Hyun-sung
- (South Korea national football team) Lee Ho
- (South Korea national football team) Min Kyung-hyun
- (South Korea national football team) Gamst (pp)
- (Mexico national football team) César Bernal
- (Mexico national football team) Juan Cisneros
- (Mexico national football team) Brayan Hernández
- (Mexico national football team) Diego Martínez
- (Mexico national football team) Antonio Monterde
- (Mexico national football team) Baruc Ochoa
- (Mexico national football team) Jesús Pérez
- (Morocco national football team) Mehdi Amri
- (Morocco national football team) Zakaria Hadraf
- (Peru national football team) Toni Alvarado
- (Peru national football team) Franco Colan
- (Peru national football team) Jesús Honores
- (Peru national football team) Yovanny Portilla
- (Peru national football team) Zein (pp)
- (Saudi Arabia national football team) Mohammed Abousaban
- (Saudi Arabia national football team) Abdullah Al-Mutairi
- (Saudi Arabia national football team) Fahad Hamad
- (Saudi Arabia national football team) Rabee Sufyani
- (Spain national football team) Aridai Cabrera
- (Spain national football team) Javier Espinosa
- (Spain national football team) Diego de la Mata
- (Spain national football team) Nico Santos
- (Spain national football team) Gilles Vidal
- (Spain national football team) Adri Contreras (pp)
- (Spain national football team) TheGrefg (pp)
- (Spain national football team) MiniBuyer (pp)
- (Turkey national football team) Oktay Kazan
- (Turkey national football team) Berk Kıratlı
- (Ukraine national football team) Denys Oliynyk
- (Ukraine national football team) Andriy Tsopa
- (United States men's national soccer team) David Ortiz
- (Uzbekistan national football team) Jasurbek Tukhtasinov
- (Uzbekistan national football team) Radion Yangirov

1 own goal

- (Mexico national football team) César Bernal (against Saudi Arabia)
