= Ilyas El Maliki =

Moroccan streamer (born 1996)

- Born: 8 August 1996 (age 30); El Jadida, Morocco
- Occupation: Live streamer

Kick information
- Channel: ilyaselmaliki
- Years active: 2020–present
- Followers: 1.1 million (18 November 2026)

Ilyas El Maliki (born 8 August 1996) also known as El Malki, is a Moroccan online streamer and social media personality active on YouTube, Facebook, and Kick. His content includes video game streaming (mainly EA Sports and GTA), analysis of sports events (mostly football), and discussion of social issues (mainly Morocco-related).

El Maliki's online following contributed to his involvement in the 2025 Kings World Cup Nations, where he was appointed chairman of the Moroccan national team, which reached the semi-finals of the tournament. During his live commentary of the Kings League match between Morocco and Colombia, El Maliki achieved a concurrent viewership peak exceeding 500,000 spectators on Kick, ranking among the platform's highest-viewed streams historically.

In the first quarter of 2023, El Maliki was the most streamed gamer on YouTube, surpassing IShowSpeed and Dr Disrespect in total number of watched hours. El Maliki is considered one of the biggest streamers born in Africa and the biggest in Morocco. He consistently ranks among Kick's top 10 most-watched streamers globally.

== Early life ==
Born and raised in the coastal city of El Jadida, central Morocco, Ilyas El Maliki, is the second-youngest of four brothers. He completed his secondary education before dedicating himself to a full-time career in online content creation. In a January 2025 interview with Al Mashhad, El Maliki said he will retire streaming in 2025.

== Kings League ==
=== Kings League invitation ===
During a live stream, El Maliki received an invitation from football legend Gerard Piqué to attend the Kings League World Cup in Italy. His on-camera reaction to the invitation became an internet sensation across Arab-speaking countries and the world.

=== Participation in Kings League (2025) ===
El Maliki represented Morocco in the Kings League tournament held in Milan, Italy, where his team achieved a semifinal finish. The Moroccan squad comprised a mix of former professional footballers and current indoor football (futsal) league players.

On January 13, 2025, the returning team received an official welcome at Rabat–Salé Airport, where they were greeted by a delegation that included Abdel Salam Belkchour, President of Morocco's National League of Professional Football. El Maliki later received an invitation to participate in the Kings League Club World Cup in France, with his team known as "Ultra Chmicha".

=== Plans for Kings League to come to Morocco ===
During a reception ceremony in Rabat honoring the Moroccan Kings League delegation, El Maliki announced plans for Morocco to host a Kings League tournament. El Malki indicated that Fouzi Lekjaa, President of the Royal Moroccan Football Federation, had confirmed this to him. The competition is reportedly scheduled to take place in Marrakesh, with the final match planned for El Jadida. However, when Kings League MENA was announced in 2025, the first tournament, known as "Kings Cup MENA", would be held in Riyadh, Saudi Arabia, as part of a deal with the Saudi PIF-backed SURJ Sports Investment. Ultra Chmicha would still participate in the league as Morocco's sole representative.

== Cultural influence ==
During Paris Saint-Germain's Ligue 1 match at Parc des Princes against Lyon FC, professional footballer Achraf Hakimi scored in the 53rd minute. Hakimi celebrated his goal by performing El Maliki's signature "violin" celebration, a Chaabi-inspired gesture the streamer had popularized during the Kings World Cup Nations tournament in Italy the previous month.

Academics like Saïd Bennis of Mohammed V University note the dual legacy of El Maliki: democratizing fame through gaming while challenging Morocco’s institutional value systems. His planned African Kings League expansion with the Royal Football Federation signals growing institutional recognition of this "problematic hero" who oscillates between national pride and digital-age provocations.

== Legal history ==
=== First legal case ===
El Maliki has been incarcerated twice, with his first imprisonment stemming from a 2023 altercation involving Simo Bourkadi, who filed a formal complaint supported by a medical certificate and video evidence. Initially charged with armed robbery involving a motor vehicle, the case was later reduced to aggravated robbery after Bourkadi submitted a waiver. El Maliki ultimately served a two-month sentence, primarily at El Jadida’s local correctional facility.

=== Second legal case ===
El Maliki faced a second prosecution in 2024 following complaints from Amazigh activists and 38 women’s/human rights organizations, who accused him of discrimination, incitement to hatred, defamation, and gender-based violence in his digital content. While Amazigh groups later withdrew their complaints—leading to the dismissal of the incitement charge—the court upheld the discrimination conviction, sentencing him to three months’ imprisonment and a 2,000-dirham fine. After appeal, the El Jadida Court reduced his sentence to two months, and he was released from custody on December 30, 2024.

== See also ==
- Football in Morocco
- Morocco national football team
- List of Morocco football players in foreign leagues
