= Érik Vera =

Mexican footballer (born 1992)

Personal information
- Full name: Érik Vera Franco
- Date of birth: 24 March 1992 (age 34)
- Place of birth: Mexico City, Mexico
- Height: 1.70 m (5 ft 7 in)
- Position: Left-back

Youth career
- 2009–2011: UNAM

Senior career*
Years	Team	Apps	(Gls)
2011–2017	UNAM	9	(0)
2013	→ Pumas Morelos (loan)	24	(0)
2015	→ Venados (loan)	15	(0)
2016	→ Necaxa (loan)	4	(0)
2017–2018	→ Atlético San Luis (loan)	29	(0)
2019	Oaxaca	11	(0)
2019–2020	Atlante	25	(2)
2020–2023	Querétaro	52	(1)
- * Club domestic league appearances and goals

Érik Vera Franco (born 24 March 1992) is a former Mexican professional footballer who last played as a left-back for Liga MX club Querétaro.
