= Pablo Leandro Gómez =

Argentine footballer

Personal information
- Full name: Pablo Leandro Gómez
- Date of birth: 16 July 1997 (age 29)
- Place of birth: Mendoza, Argentina
- Height: 1.66 m (5 ft 5 in)
- Position: Winger

Youth career
- 2016–2018: Club Puebla

Senior career*
Years	Team	Apps	(Gls)
2015	Real Cuautitlán	6	(0)
2019–2020	Puebla	4	(0)
2019–2020	→ Cimarrones de Sonora (loan)	19	(2)
2020–2021	Atlante	31	(3)
2021–2022	Querétaro	4	(0)
2022	→ UAT (loan)	26	(3)
2023	Chiapas	14	(3)
- * Club domestic league appearances and goals as of 29 August 2021 (UTC)

Pablo Leandro Gómez (born 16 July 1997) is a former Argentine professional footballer who last played as a forward. He is the son of deceased footballer Pablo Hernán Gómez. Together with his sister, Gómez survived the automobile accident which killed his parents.

== Career statistics ==
=== Club ===
As of 29 May 2020.

Club	Season	League			Cup		Continental		Other		Total	
Club	Season	Division	Apps	Goals	Apps	Goals	Apps	Goals	Apps	Goals	Apps	Goals
Club Puebla	2016–17	Liga MX	0	0	3 (Note: Appearances in the Copa MX)	0	–		0	0	3	0
Club Puebla	2017–18	Liga MX	0	0	3	0	–		0	0	3	0
Club Puebla	2018–19	Liga MX	4	0	1	0	–		0	0	5	0
Club Puebla	Total		4	0	7	0	0	0	0	0	11	0
Cimarrones de Sonora	2019–20	Ascenso MX	19	2	4	0	–		0	0	23	2
Career total			23	2	11	0	0	0	0	0	34	2
