= Shunsuke Nakamura (footballer, born 1994) =

Japanese footballer

Shunsuke Nakamura 中村 駿介
Personal information
- Full name: Shunsuke Nakamura
- Date of birth: 16 May 1994 (age 32)
- Place of birth: Niiza, Saitama, Japan
- Height: 1.66 m (5 ft 5 in)
- Position: Midfielder

Youth career
- Urawa Red Diamonds
- Senshu University

Senior career*
Years	Team	Apps	(Gls)
2017	HBO Tokyo		
2017–2018	Qrendi FC	28	(6)
2018	Pietà Hotspurs	13	(4)
2018–2019	Valmieras FK	31	(2)
2020	Persela Lamongan	2	(0)

International career
2011	Japan U17		
- * Club domestic league appearances and goals as of 19 February 2025

Shunsuke Nakamura (中村 駿介, Nakamura Shunsuke; born 16 May 1994) is a Japanese professional footballer who played as a midfielder.
