= Younes Zarou =

German social media influencer

- Zarou in 2022
- Born: 26 January 1998 (age 28); Frankfurt, Germany
- Occupation: Social media influencer

TikTok information
- Page: YZ
- Years active: 2019–present
- Followers: 57.4 million

YouTube information
- Channel: Younes Zarou
- Years active: 2021–present
- Subscribers: 27.5 million
- Views: 23 billion
- Last updated: 9 July 2026

Younes Zarou (born 26 January 1998) is a German social media influencer. He is best known for his short videos and his livestreams. As of July 2026, his TikTok account has over 57.9 million followers.

== Life and career ==
Zarou was born in Frankfurt. His father was a car repair shop owner, and his mother was a nurse. According to the Frankfurter Allgemeine Zeitung, he is a Muslim. He attended Provadis School of International Management and Technology, studying business informatics. In 2020, he worked in a consulting firm.

Zarou created his TikTok account in 2019, uploading his first video on 22 August 2019. In 2020, he gained popularity for his short videos and livestreams on the platform, garnering over 20,000 to 30,000 viewers, and then over 240,000 viewers. In August 2020, he was dubbed as "Germany's TikTok King" by the Frankfurter Allgemeine Zeitung. On 6 May 2021, he created his YouTube channel, uploading his first video on 10 December 2021. In 2024, he collaborated with chancellor Olaf Scholz on TikTok.

With over 57.4 million followers on TikTok, he is the 26th most-followed person on the platform as of 2026.
