= César Bernal =

Mexican footballer (born 1995)

Personal information
- Full name: César Enrique Bernal Ávila
- Date of birth: 14 February 1995 (age 31)
- Place of birth: Torreón, Coahuila, Mexico
- Height: 1.77 m (5 ft 10 in)
- Position: Defender

Youth career
- 2012–2015: Santos Laguna

Senior career*
Years	Team	Apps	(Gls)
2015–2016	Santos Laguna	0	(0)
2016	→ Celaya (loan)	1	(0)
2016	→ Irapuato (loan)	2	(1)
2016–2022	Tampico Madero	103	(2)
2022–2023	Sonora	10	(1)
- * Club domestic league appearances and goals as of 12 April 2022

César Enrique Bernal Ávila (Note: In this Spanish name, the first or paternal surname is Bernal and the second or maternal family name is Ávila.) (born 14 February 1995) is a former Mexican professional footballer who played as a defender. He made his professional debut with Santos Laguna during a Copa MX victory over Correcaminos UAT on 19 August 2014.

== Honours ==
Tampico Madero

- Liga de Expansión MX: Guardianes 2020
