= Lucas Tylty =

Brazilian businessperson and influencer (born 1996)

- Born: Lucas Machado de Araujo Bezerra; 3 October 1996 (age 29)
- Occupations: Sports bettor; YouTuber; businessman
- Years active: 2016–present

Lucas Machado de Araujo Bezerra, better known as Lucas Tylty, (born October 3, 1996), He is a Brazilian sports bettor, social media personality, and businessman. He became widely known for his influence in the sports betting scene and for his online content related to football and entertainment.

Lucas was born and grew up in São João de Meriti, in the Metropolitan Region of Rio de Janeiro. To attend the 2014 FIFA World Cup, he sold cheese bread and raised money from family and friends. In 2016, at the age of 20, Tylty moved to Las Vegas, in the United States, where he worked as a pizza chef, baker, and flyer distributor. In 2017, he began documenting his life on YouTube. Over the years, his channel grew rapidly and surpassed 1 million subscribers, becoming a reference among football fans, players, and former athletes such as Adriano Imperador, Júlio César, Zé Roberto, and Craque Neto. Tylty also has more than 7 million followers on Instagram, consolidating himself not only as one of the biggest names in the betting industry, but also as one of the most influential figures in football across Brazil, Latin America, and the world.

In 2022, Tylty attended all 64 matches of the FIFA World Cup in Qatar, setting a world record for most matches attended at a single tournament.

He gained media attention after winning R$500,000 by betting on Chelsea’s victory in the FIFA Club World Cup final. He also made headlines by purchasing Gabigol’s match-worn boot for R$100,000 in a charity auction.

Tylty has been invited to several international events, including a dinner with Cristiano Ronaldo in Saudi Arabia, and a gala event hosted by Chelsea FC in London. In 2024, he gained further prominence after bidding R$1.5 million in Neymar Jr.’s charity auction.

== Personal life ==
Tylty is married to Roberta Cora, an image consultant, with whom he had been dating since 2018. He is the father of a boy named Frank Lampard, and has a stepdaughter named Manoela Cora. Tylty is a supporter of Chelsea Football Club.
