= Mykhailo Lebiha =

Ukrainian blogger, streamer

- Михайло Лебіга
- Born: 21 November 1997 (age 28); Mykhailiuchka, Khmelnytskyi Oblast, Ukraine
- Occupations: Blogger, streamer, TikToker

Mykhailo Anatoliiovych Lebiha (Ukrainian: Михайло Анатолійович Лебіга) is a Ukrainian blogger and streamer.

== Discography ==
=== Singles ===
List of singles as lead artist, with selected chart positions
Title	Year	Peak chart positions		Album or EP
Title	Year	UKR Air.	CIS Air.	Album or EP
"A ya vse plakala" (with Dorofeeva)	2024	3	127	Heartbeat
