= Gaules =

Brazilian online streamer (born 1983)

- Born: Alexandre Borba Chiqueta; December 2, 1983 (age 42); São Paulo, Brazil
- Occupations: Influencer, streamer, YouTuber
- Years active: 2017–present

Twitch information
- Channel: gaules
- Genre: Electronic Games
- Game: Counter-Strike: Global Offensive
- Followers: 4.07 million

Esports career information
- Game: Counter-Strike
- Playing career: 2000–2007
- Coaching career: 2007–2008

Alexandre Borba Chiqueta (São Paulo, December 2, 1983), known as Gaules, is a Brazilian Counter-Strike streamer, YouTuber, philanthropist, and former professional player.

== Overview ==
He started his professional career at g3nerationX (g3x) in 2001 when the team went to the World Cyber Games final. In 2007, the team migrated to Made in Brazil, initially with Gaules as the leader, and later as team manager. That year they won DreamHack Winter 2007, an achievement that "helped shape the role of the coach in esports in Brazil".

In 2008, during his degree in Marketing, he left his esports career to work at Samsung, being responsible for the IT sector and obtaining partnerships. Around 2010, he decided to leave the company and return to esports, creating several projects such as the Brazilian National Game Team and the Brazil Gaming League. However, Gaules began to pull away from the companies, and "found himself with nothing"; being diagnosed with depression, and attempting suicide in December 2017. Then, he began to "transform the situation"; asking old friends at g3x for help and starting to do live streams on Twitch to afford his rent and medication.

As of 2018, Gaules became recognized as a streamer. ESPN stated he was "the biggest Brazilian Twitch phenomenon" of the year. In 2020, he won the eSports Brazil Awards for best streamer and personality of the year. In the same year, he was the second most-watched streamer in the world on Twitch and recognized as a standout in esports by TechTudo and Globo Esporte. He also got attention for his philanthropic work, which included participation in projects against COVID-19 and for environmental protection.

== Career ==
=== 2000–2006: NaN Tatuapé and creation of g3nerationX ===
At the age of 17, in the early 2000s, Gaules used to frequent the gaming center Monkey Tatuapé. According to him, his dream was to join the Counter-Strike team there; he asked daily to be part of it, but his proposal was always rejected. Gaules wanted to join the team because: "I couldn't afford to pay [for the hours], and the players' sponsorship was to play for free while there were no clients. Also, because I wanted to be on the best team in the LAN gaming center I frequented." He believed that he was fit to join the team, because, according to him, "I studied the game. I watched the best in the gaming center play because I didn't have money to pay for the time spent there. I was going to the championship because I wanted to be in that environment every day to get my shot."

Tired of Gaules' insistence in asking to join the team, Monkey Tatuapé decided to put him as the leader of a junior team. Although this left Gaules discouraged, he realized that there were two ways to face the situation: "either as a bad thing or as an opportunity to join the main team. I set up the team with other very young players and we started training against them." In 2001, he had the opportunity to travel with the main team to Rio de Janeiro and compete in the first selection of the Cyberathlete Professional League in Brazil. One of the players on the team was playing badly, and Gaules, who was called to replace him, recalls: "I didn't even change equipment or anything, I just sat at the computer and we turned the match around. Then I never left the team again."

However, Gaules was only on the first team for a short period of time. The LAN center franchise decided to make a selection, picking the top players to form one lineup, and Gaules was left out. Thus, he decided to create his team, g3nerationX (abbreviated as g3x), on July 27, 2001, with Igor "VIP" Melro, Rodrigo "crash" Rodrigues, Mee, and Feijaum, who also frequented the gaming center. The team's first championship was at the inauguration of another Monkey's, the Monkey's Santa Cruz, where the local team would also play. G3x defeated the Santa Cruz team, and Gaules recalls: "Everyone kept asking where we had come from. All the spotlight was on the team and we got a lot of visibility [by winning from them]."

After the victory, Gaules, VIP, and crash remained in g3x, but Mee and Feijaum left, giving way to Rafael "BlooD" Frid, Raphael "cogu" Camargo, and Carlos Henrique "Kiko" Segal. With this line-up, g3x took its first international flight and won the Brazilian leg of the World Cyber Games (WCG). They managed a spot in the world final of the tournament, in Seoul, South Korea. With Guilherme "Carva" Carvalhaes substituting Kiko, g3x managed to place 7–8th in the championship. After that, g3x had a "hegemonic" period, according to ESPN. Gaules reports that the team went from the end of 2001 until 2003 "without losing a match". In this period, there was a breakup, and Kiko and cogu went to other teams. Between 2004 and 2006, g3x won championships such as the LatinCup (2004), World Cyber Games Brazil (2005), and CPL World Season 2006: Brazil. In 2006, the team's partnership with Intel ended, which made their situation difficult.

=== 2007: migration to MIBR and DreamHack Winter ===
In 2007, with the approaching of the esports league Championship Gaming Series (CGS), Gaules talked to Paulo "pvell" Velloso about the possibility of a partnership with the MIBR team, which, until then, was a rival.

"He invited our team to join the MIBR [since the main MIBR lineup would participate in CGS and no longer play 1.6 tournaments]. It was a legitimate invitation, giving me the backing to take care of, manage, and decide who comes and goes. I met with the g3x players, explained the situation and we voted."

At the time, the team was formed by Gaules, Thiago "btt" Monteiro, Norberto "Lance" Lage, Lincoln "fnx" Lau, and Wellington "ton" Caruso. According to Gaules, most members decided to go to MIBR because of the structure. He started playing and managing the team. Later, "pvell" sought out Gaules to remind him that Bruno "bit" Lima, the only remnant of the team that went to CGS, deserved a spot among MIBR's starters. However, there were only five spots for six players, so Gaules chose to give up his spot. He said: "I suggested that I become the coach, and "pvell" liked the idea very much [...] My dream was to play, but I was the leader and I couldn't abandon anyone. It was with this that we created one of the strongest teams, if not the strongest, that we have ever had." In November 2007, Lance and Olavo "chucky" Napoleon switched places, and Gaules returned to play alongside his former g3x teammates.

The MIBR team went to DreamHack Winter 2007, and despite having a guaranteed spot in the tournament, Gaules opted to play the BYOC (bring your computer) tryout:

"If we didn't have the ability to win BYOC, we wouldn't be ready to be world champions. We got into the BYOC final against Spirit of Amiga (SoA), which was a great team, and we came out behind. There I kept asking myself why I had decided to play BYOC. We were playing with rented computers and monitors and putting five people in a space that could fit four. Ton had to use the keyboard on his lap on some maps."

Despite these complications, MIBR beat SoA, and went on to participate in the main competition. The team was undefeated and, according to Gaules, the achievement "helped shape the role of the coach in esports in Brazil [...] I felt like I was part of the team, I just didn't have a mouse and keyboard in my hand. Everyone was talking about how we won with six players."

=== 2008–2016: Samsung, return to esports and the Brazilian National Team ===
In mid-2008, Gaules was finishing his degree in Marketing and got an internship at Samsung. He made the decision to leave his career in esports to work in a formal job, "earning a lot less and working a lot more." Gaules took care of the IT department and obtained good partnerships for tournaments, teams and players, such as a Samsung sponsorship for MIBR. Expecting to be hired as a permanent employee before 2010, Gaules was warned: "You will only be hired after you graduate," but he states that "after about 6 or 7 months of training, I told them that either they would have to hire me or I would leave. It ended up that I was the first employee to be hired without a degree."

According to Gaules, Samsung gave awards "every six months or a year to people who made a difference in the company" and Gaules was one of them. He was invited by the company to go to World Cyber Games 2010 to accompany the Brazilian delegation, which included Gabriel "FalleN" Toledo and others from Complexity Gaming. There, Gaules saw that Brazil "was still too far behind the other countries", so he decided to leave the company and return to esports.

Gaules then started a production company intending to create videos for teams and brands in the Brazilian market. He ran the project for Mandic and started the Brazilian Game Team (SBG) in 2011. This managed to "professionalize the teams," and according to him:

"We showed that with advisory, journalists, photographers, marketing, customer service, and other functions within a team, you could do something with more return for the brands that were investing. And that was replicated."

Other Gaules projects also started to emerge, such as the Brazil Gaming League, X5 Agency, and X5 Mega Arena.

"I was actively involved on all those fronts. As a player, coach, manager, team owner, event organizer, and streamer. I got a background that made me understand every possible scenario because I participated in the creation, where it's hardest."

=== 2017–2018: depression, suicide attempt and recovery ===
In 2017, Gaules began to move away from companies, as he no longer wanted to "be dependent on other people." He chose to do a project at an agency to advise teams, events, and players, but as he couldn't find himself within the agency, matters were made worse. Gaules was diagnosed with severe depression, and he "found himself with nothing": "That's when I broke down. I ended up making bad choices in terms of investment. I was broke [...] I invested in things that didn't work out." This culminated in a suicide attempt in December 2017:

"I stopped and thought that even that [the suicide] I couldn't do, so it meant that there was something very big coming. That's when I decided to transform that situation. I had no partner, no girlfriend, no job, no money in the bank, and no place to live. That's when I discovered that I had built a story that was priceless."

Gaules rented an apartment with no collateral and, with his computer and webcam, turned to his friends in the old esports days for help. He said that only the players Mee, Apoka, vip and Crash helped him. Gaules "needed help to eat, live, and have a 2 or 3 months' peace of mind to [get] back on his feet."

In 2018, with the support of the old g3x team, Gaules began streaming on Twitch, deciding to "stream like someone who is going to die the next day." Gaules "reinvented himself and was reborn alongside new and old fans," who are called "tribe" by him. He was already making videos for YouTube, but decided to do broadcasts as "it was the only thing I could see in my mind that I could do." He mentions that following this path was "natural."

"I realized that [Twitch] was an environment that most wanted status, fame, and money. And I was there just because I didn't want to starve anymore, I didn't want to depend on anyone, and I wanted to make people feel better. For me, it was a great therapy."

Gaules started broadcasting to a few people, "with no partnership, no verified account, with nothing." He mentions that even with the help of his fans, it was not enough. Gaules asked for "help to go to the psychiatrist, to pay the rent, to buy medicine, to pay for the internet [...]" and says he was always honest about what he was doing with the money he received. He doubled the amount of money the following month, but this was still not enough. Gaules questioned whether to "give up there" or to "see that on the bright side," and decided to continue.

With the slow growth of his channel, Gaules was criticized by some. He recounts that one person said that Gaules was "embarrassing himself" and "mending [sic] on the Internet," but Gaules said that "these people who were laughing at me would laugh with me."

"The whole tribe thing and the things that happened created this community, which for me is my family. Two years ago I moved away from my family for several reasons, and today I see how easy it is to empathize with your mom and dad. It's hard to empathize with people you don't know, and I decided to empathize with them. They ended up becoming my family and today I have the biggest family in the world."

By October 25, 2018, the date of publication of an interview with Gaules on ESPN, he was still treating depression, but also reported that he no longer had symptoms. He said the cure was "the tribe".

"The issues we deal with within the tribe are heavy. We talk about abuse, depression, prejudice, and crises. What I hear most is people saying that the tribe saved them from depression, that they got a job, the woman or man they wanted. They got happiness. The tribe saved not only my life, but it saves lives daily."

=== 2019–present: championships and partnerships ===
On October 15, 2019, he announced that he would broadcast the Counter-Strike: Global Offensive (CS:GO) StarSeries S8 championship. On March 30, 2020, he announced a partnership with Omelete Company. On May 4, he participated in Twitch Rivals, a tournament to celebrate the arrival of Valorant beta in Brazil. In June, Gaules started a project to promote black streamers from Wakanda Streamers. On July 17, he participated in the video "Enquadro do Peçanha – CSGO", from Porta dos Fundos, along with FalleN, arT and boltz. The following month, ESL and DreamHack announced a partnership with Rede Globo and Gaules. Both will have the rights to broadcast ESL Pro Tour tournaments until 2023. Globo also announced a partnership with Gaules and Omelete Co., and a championship worth one spot for ESL One: Rio 2020 was launched, the "Tribe to Major". The tournament had qualifiers open to 512 teams, which could register on September 1, and the matches were played between the 11th and 13th. On the 12th of the same month, Gaules announced a new "Tribe" credit card, in partnership with Banco do Brasil.

On February 24, 2021, Gaules tested positive for COVID-19, taking a break from streaming, returning on March 4. On May 31, it was announced that Gaules would be the first in the world to broadcast officially the National Basketball Association (NBA) games on Twitch, starting on June 2. One of these games ended up being broadcast outside the Brazilian region, a likely reason that led to a temporary ban on his account on November 5. On November 12, it was announced that Gaules would be the first Brazilian streamer to broadcast a Formula 1 race. On December 5, 2021, he announced the launch of the podcast "Fenômenos" ("Phenomenons") in partnership with Ronaldo, a ten-episode show that hosts guests such as Neymar and Tiago Leifert. The episodes of the first season were recorded in person and remotely, and were launched in 2022.

On January 21, 2022, Gaules partnered with the Carioca Championship to broadcast 16 matches of the state championship on Twitch. The first match on the platform was on January 26, between Flamengo and Portuguesa and reached the 36,000 viewer mark. During the final between Flamengo and Fluminense, which made Fluminense the 2022 carioca champion, Gaules peaked at 24,000 viewers. On February 8, 2022, Gaules announced a partnership with Vicar to show the full 2022 season of the Stock Car Pro Series, as well as the access category Stock Series and the biggest new feature in Brazilian motorsports of the year, the FIA-accredited Formula 4 Brazil. The broadcast team, however, would not count with Gaules. The streamers Liminha, Velho Vamp, Apoka, and Mch were present in some of the rounds and commanded the livestreams. The first stream took place on Sunday (02/13), with the famous Stock Car Pro Series Double Race, at Interlagos.

On March 16, 2022, Gaules signed a sponsorship and joined Red Bull's team of athletes and players, expanding a relationship with the brand that began in 2014, when together they created a LoL tournament that would become Red Bull Solo Q. Gaules joined a team of 26 athletes and 2 players from Brazil, with names like Pedro Scooby, Letícia Bufoni, Ítalo Ferreira, Lucas Fink, Sandro Dias, Lucas Chumbo, Cacá Bueno and the FURIA. On March 30, 2022, Gaules was announced as head of gaming at KaBuM!, with the main goal of getting closer to the gamer community. On April 11, 2022, Gaules became an Eno brand ambassador, in partnership with the "No Heartburn Will Stop the Tribe" campaign, a project that aims to promote health care and counteract the social heartburn caused by prejudice and discrimination within the gamer community.

== Recognition ==
ESPN has stated that Gaules was "the biggest Brazilian Twitch phenomenon in 2018", and Globo Esporte mentioned in November 2020 that he was "one of the main names in streaming in Brazil, especially of Counter-Strike: Global Offensive (CS:GO)." Similarly, TechTudo said in 2018 that Gaules was "the biggest name in CS:GO on Twitch [...] is an indispensable streamer when talking about CS:GO." In another publication on the same site, it was stated that in 2020, Gaules was a Brazilian highlight for esports with his success on Twitch, noting that he streamed tournaments of CS:GO and assorted games such as Among Us and FIFA 21. Globo Esporte put Gaules on its list of the "ten Brazilian streamers who stood out in 2020," saying that he "was the phenomenon of the year, and that is undeniable." TechTudo said that Gaules was one of the streamers who echoed the practice of rerun on Twitch.

On July 2, 2020, Brazilian driver Enzo Fittipaldi, grandson of two-time Formula 1 world champion Emerson Fittipaldi, stamped the streamer's branding on his HWA Racelab Formula 3 car.

One of the positions on the CS:GO map "Train" is popularly called "Gaules" in honor of the streamer. He was the face of the PogChamp emote on Twitch for one day on January 25, 2021.

On December 9, 2021, Gaules announced his contract renewal with Twitch. To celebrate the extension of the agreement, an advertisement was aired on one of the big screens in Times Square in New York City.

=== Popularity ===
On March 1, 2019, Gaules reached 100,000 spectators for the first time. He was the 88th highest-earning streamer of the year, with US$91,000. That same year, he was the only Brazilian in Twitch's top 10 most-watched streamers, ranking seventh. In 2020, Gaules broke several simultaneous viewer records in Brazil: On March 30, he broke the record with 156,000 viewers in a broadcast of the 11th season of the ESL Pro League. The record was surpassed by MIBR TV with 166,000 on April 20 in a broadcast of the same tournament, but Gaules surpassed it again with 182,000 on May 3, streaming the ESL One Road to Rio. On June 1, streaming the BLAST Premier League, he became the first Brazilian streamer to reach over 200,000 simultaneous viewers (206,000). The record was broken by Riot Games five days later, in a stream of the Brazilian League of Legends Championship (CBLOL), which was broken four hours later by Gaules, in a stream of the BLAST Premier Spring Showdown with 266,000 simultaneous viewers. On the 21st, Gaules broke his record by doing a broadcast of BLAST Premier Spring Finals with 393,000 viewers, a record that stood until February 11, 2021, when Loud's Gabriel "bak" did 511,000 viewers on a broadcast of Garena Free Fire.

In June 2020, Gaules reached 1 million followers on Twitch, and reached 2 million on the platform on October 28. In May, June, and November 2020, he was the world's most-watched streamer on the platform. With 7 billion minutes watched. He was the second most-watched streamer of 2020, behind only Canadian Félix "xQc".

On July 31, 2021, Gaules reached 50,000 subscribers on Twitch, becoming the most subscribed channel on the platform in Brazil and, globally, the fifth. In October 2021, he was again the world's most-watched streamer on the platform, with 18.1 million hours watched. Gaules was the second most-watched streamer in the world that year, again behind only xQc.

== Philanthropy ==
Clutch, the Brazilian CS: GO league championship, announced in March 2020 the Hold this Position Cup, a special charity cup whose donations were used to help fight COVID-19. The cup was attended by Gaules. The amount raised, R$60,000 (US$11,000 approximately), was donated to the Central Única das Favelas (CUFA). Additionally, Gaules donated R$156,000 (around US$30,000) on his own, a tribute to a record live stream the week before the donation, when more than 156,000 simultaneous viewers watched his stream. The following month, he participated in a Greenpeace project, drawing attention to the International Day for Biodiversity and deforestation of the Amazon. On September 22, he donated one thousand reais (approximately two hundred dollars) to the Instituto Socioambiental da Bacia do Alto Paraguai SOS Pantanal, a non-governmental, nonprofit organization based in Campo Grande to promote positive impacts for the conservation and sustainable development of the biome. When posting such a fact on his Twitter account, Gaules noticed that some people were bothered by the "ostentation", which encouraged him to increase the donation amount, totaling thirty one thousand reais (around six thousand dollars).

On the morning of January 15, 2021, he raised, in two hours, through his streams, sixteen thousand reais (approximately three thousand dollars) for the Mais Amor Manaus project, which aimed to help the situation of overloaded hospitals in the city due to the high number of cases of COVID-19. He doubled the donation afterwards. On December 11, 2021, Gaules donated 25 thousand reais (almost 5 thousand dollars), on behalf of the Tribe, to help the cities in Bahia that were affected by the overflowing of two rivers, after storms that occurred in the south of the state. On the 24th, he donated 115 thousand reais (22,500 dollars approximately) to a bedridden elderly woman.

== Awards and nominations ==
Year	Organization	Category	Result	Ref.
2019	Esports Brazil Award	Personality of the Year	Nominated	
2019	Esports Brazil Award	Best Streamer of the Year	Nominated	
2020	Esports Awards	Streamer of the Year	Nominated	
2020	MTV Millennial Awards Brazil	Brazilian Streamer	Nominated	
2020	Esports Brazil Award	Personality of the Year	Won	
2020	Esports Brazil Award	Best Streamer of the Year	Won	
2020	Twitch Participation Ceremony	Greater Social Participation	Won	
2021	Golden Cube Award	Geek Personality of the Year	Won	
2021	Golden Cube Award	Streamer Geek of the Year	Nominated	
2021	Esports Brazil Award	Personality of the Year	Nominated	
2021	Esports Brazil Award	Best Streamer of the Year	Won	
2021	The Game Awards 2021	Criador de Conteúdo do Ano	Nominated	
