= 2010–11 Primera Catalana =

The 2010–11 Primera Catalana was the 20th season of Primera Catalana, the 5th tier of the Spanish football league system and the highest league of the autonomous community of Catalonia. The top three were promoted to Tercera División, and the bottom two were relegated to the Segona Catalana.

== Primera Catalana ==
Primera Catalana
- Season: 2010–11
- Champions: UE Olot
- Promoted: UE Olot; UEC Vic; UE Rubí
- Relegated: CD Blanes; UE Pueblo Seco
- Matches: 380
- Goals: 1,091 (2.87 per match)
- Biggest home win: Tàrrega 7–0 Iberiana (19 September 2010); Vic 7–0 Iberiana (21 November 2010); Rubí 7–0 Pueblo Seco (22 May 2011)
- Biggest away win: San Cristóbal 0–5 Gramenet B (12 September 2010); Blanes 2–7 Rapitenca (17 October 2010); Pueblo Seco 1–6 Iberiana (10 April 2011); Gramenet B 0–5 Vic (5 June 2011)
- Highest scoring: Blanes 6–4 Iberiana (16 January 2011)

A total of 20 teams will contest the league, including 3 relegated from the Tercera División and 3 promoted from the Preferent Territorial.

=== Promotion and relegation ===
Teams relegated from 2009–10 Tercera División

- UE Rapitenca
- CD Blanes
- CF Olesa de Montserrat

Teams promoted from 2009–10 Preferent Territorial

- Olímpic Can Fatjó
- UEC Vic
- UE Olot

=== League table ===
2010–11 Primera Catalana league table
Pos	Team	Pld	W	D	L	GF	GA	GD	Pts	Promotion or relegation
1	UE Olot (C, P)	38	25	6	7	70	31	+39	56	Promotion to Tercera División
2	UEC Vic (P)	38	23	11	4	73	35	+38	57	Promotion to Tercera División
3	UE Rubí (P)	38	21	10	7	64	35	+29	52	Promotion to Tercera División
4	UE Tàrrega	38	20	10	8	73	42	+31	50	
5	CF Peralada	38	18	7	13	67	49	+18	43	
6	Gimnástica Iberiana	38	18	4	16	65	78	−13	40	
7	UE Vilassar de Mar	38	15	12	11	58	44	+14	42	
8	UE Rapitenca	38	17	6	15	70	49	+21	40	
9	Olímpic Can Fatjó	38	15	10	13	54	54	0	40	
10	FC Santfeliuenc	38	12	12	14	49	53	−4	36	
11	CD Tortosa	38	12	12	14	51	51	0	36	
12	CF Igualada	38	12	11	15	56	61	−5	35	
13	CP San Cristóbal	38	13	7	18	43	55	−12	33	
14	UDA Gramenet B	38	13	6	19	44	66	−22	32	
15	AD Guíxols	38	11	12	15	44	56	−12	34	
16	CF Olesa de Montserrat	38	12	8	18	49	54	−5	32	
17	UE Sants	38	11	11	16	44	52	−8	33	
18	CD Montcada	38	10	12	16	42	56	−14	32	
19	CD Blanes (R)	38	9	9	20	49	70	−21	27	Relegation to Segunda Catalana
20	UE Poble Sec (R)	38	3	4	31	26	100	−74	10	Relegation to Segunda Catalana

Rules for classification: 1st points; 2nd head-to-head points; 3rd head-to-head goal difference; 4th head-to-head goals scored; 5th goal difference; 6th number of goals scored
(C) Champions; (P) Promoted; (R) Relegated

=== Results ===
Home \ Away	OLO	VIC	RUB	TAR	PER	GIB	VIM	RAP	OCF	STF	TOR	IGU	SCR	GRA	GUI	OLM	STS	MON	BLA	PSE
UE Olot		0–1	2–0	2–1	1–0	1–0	3–1	3–1	6–1	2–0	2–0	3–2	2–1	1–0	1–0	1–1	3–0	2–0	2–0	5–0
UEC Vic	2–0		0–0	4–3	2–1	7–0	1–0	1–0	2–2	3–1	3–1	0–0	0–1	3–0	3–0	3–0	1–1	1–0	1–1	2–0
UE Rubí	1–0	2–2		2–1	2–1	3–0	2–2	1–3	2–0	3–0	2–1	0–1	2–0	2–1	5–1	0–1	2–1	1–0	2–0	7–0
UE Tàrrega	0–2	4–4	1–1		3–1	7–0	1–1	1–0	1–3	2–1	2–1	3–1	2–1	2–0	2–1	2–1	4–1	4–0	2–0	5–0
CF Peralada	0–1	2–2	3–0	1–1		2–0	2–2	3–1	0–2	1–2	2–1	3–1	4–0	0–4	1–0	3–1	1–0	1–2	4–0	4–0
Gimnástica Iberiana	1–3	3–1	1–0	0–2	2–0		2–1	4–3	1–0	1–1	1–2	2–4	1–0	2–1	5–1	2–0	3–1	1–1	4–3	1–0
UE Vilassar de Mar	1–3	3–1	1–2	1–1	1–1	1–2		3–0	1–1	3–2	0–1	2–0	1–2	4–1	1–1	1–0	1–1	2–0	1–0	5–0
UE Rapitenca	2–1	0–1	2–2	1–1	4–0	4–0	1–1		1–2	3–0	0–1	4–2	0–2	4–0	2–0	0–1	3–0	2–0	0–1	3–1
Olímpic Can Fatjó	1–1	1–1	1–1	1–1	2–3	1–2	1–2	2–3		0–1	4–2	2–0	0–2	2–3	0–3	1–1	3–1	4–2	1–1	2–0
FC Santfeliuenc	1–1	1–2	1–1	0–0	3–1	1–3	1–2	0–2	1–1		4–0	1–3	2–1	2–0	2–0	2–2	3–2	1–1	0–1	3–1
CD Tortosa	0–1	3–1	0–0	0–3	1–1	4–1	0–0	0–0	2–0	1–1		2–0	1–0	3–3	0–0	1–1	0–2	5–0	2–2	2–0
CF Igualada	0–2	1–2	2–0	1–1	2–2	2–2	1–4	0–2	1–2	2–0	4–3		1–2	5–2	1–1	2–0	1–1	0–0	2–1	2–0
CP San Cristóbal	2–1	0–2	0–2	1–2	2–1	5–2	2–1	1–1	0–1	1–1	0–0	2–2		0–5	1–0	1–2	0–1	2–2	1–0	3–0
UDA Gramenet B	3–3	0–5	0–2	2–0	0–4	1–0	2–1	0–2	1–2	0–3	1–1	1–1	1–2		2–2	2–1	1–0	0–1	2–1	0–3
AD Guíxols	1–0	1–1	3–3	2–1	0–1	2–0	3–1	3–2	3–1	0–1	3–1	1–1	2–1	0–1		2–2	1–1	0–1	0–4	1–1
CF Olesa de Montserrat	2–0	0–1	0–1	0–3	1–4	1–2	1–2	2–0	0–1	1–1	1–2	1–3	3–1	2–0	1–1		1–2	0–1	5–1	4–1
UE Sants	1–1	1–1	0–2	4–1	2–3	1–1	0–0	4–3	1–1	1–1	2–0	0–2	1–0	0–1	0–0	1–2		1–0	0–1	2–0
CD Montcada	2–2	1–2	1–2	0–1	0–0	4–3	0–1	2–2	0–2	2–2	1–1	1–0	1–1	0–0	4–1	1–4	1–3		3–1	4–1
CD Blanes	1–2	0–2	2–2	1–1	0–3	6–4	1–1	2–7	1–2	1–2	1–5	4–2	3–0	0–1	0–2	1–1	1–0	0–0		5–0
UE Pueblo Seco	1–4	1–2	0–2	0–1	1–3	1–6	1–2	1–2	0–1	2–0	2–1	1–1	2–2	0–1	1–2	1–2	2–4	0–3	1–1	

Source: arquero-arba
Legend: Blue = home team win; Yellow = draw; Red = away team win.

=== Locations ===
Locations of the Primera Catalana 2010–11 teams
Locations of the Primera Catalana 2010–11 teams from Barcelona municipality
