= UE Avià =

Avià
- Full name: Unió Esportiva Avià
- Founded: 1963
- Ground: Camp Municipal d'Avià; Avià, Catalonia, Spain
- Chairman: (Spain) Ramon Prat
- Manager: (Spain) Oliver Ballabriga
- League: Tercera Catalana – Group 8
- 2024–25: Segona Catalana – Group 4, 15th of 16 (relegated)
- Website: http://www.ueavia.com/
Home colours	Away colours

Unió Esportiva Avià is a football team based in Avià, Barcelona, Catalonia, Spain. Founded in 1963, it plays in Tercera Catalana – Group 8.

== History ==
UE Avià was founded on 1963 but it not played FCF competitions until 1979–80 season. After a decade in the lower league of Catalonia football league system the club promoted four times. This season UE Avià plays in Primera Catalana, the highest regional level.

== Season to season ==
Season	Tier	Division	Place	Copa del Rey
1983–84	8	3ª Reg.	11th	
1984–85	8	3ª Reg.	4th	
1985–86	8	3ª Reg.	4th	
1986–87	8	3ª Reg.	12th	
1987–88	8	3ª Reg.	6th	
1988–89	8	3ª Reg.	1st	
1989–90	7	2ª Reg.	5th	
1990–91	7	2ª Reg.	5th	
1991–92	8	2ª Terr.	9th	
1992–93	8	2ª Terr.	9th	
1993–94	8	2ª Terr.	2nd	
1994–95	7	1ª Terr.	11th	
1995–96	7	1ª Terr.	8th	
1996–97	7	1ª Terr.	8th	
1997–98	7	1ª Terr.	3rd	
1998–99	7	1ª Terr.	3rd	
1999–2000	7	1ª Terr.	3rd	
2000–01	7	1ª Terr.	3rd	
2001–02	7	1ª Terr.	4th	
2002–03	7	1ª Terr.	3rd	

Season	Tier	Division	Place	Copa del Rey
2003–04	7	1ª Terr.	4th	
2004–05	7	1ª Terr.	3rd	
2005–06	7	1ª Terr.	3rd	
2006–07	7	1ª Terr.	3rd	
2007–08	7	1ª Terr.	7th	
2008–09	7	1ª Terr.	11th	
2009–10	7	1ª Terr.	2nd	
2010–11	6	Pref. Terr.	4th	
2011–12	5	1ª Cat.	7th	
2012–13	5	1ª Cat.	8th	
2013–14	5	1ª Cat.	11th	
2014–15	5	1ª Cat.	4th	
2015–16	5	1ª Cat.	12th	
2016–17	5	1ª Cat.	17th	
2017–18	6	2ª Cat.	17th	
2018–19	7	3ª Cat.	3rd	
2019–20	7	3ª Cat.	2nd	
2020–21	6	2ª Cat.	10th	
2021–22	7	2ª Cat.	12th	
2022–23	8	3ª Cat.	3rd	

Season	Tier	Division	Place	Copa del Rey
2023–24	9	3ª Cat.	2nd	
2024–25	8	2ª Cat.	15th	
2025–26	9	3ª Cat.		
