= Joan Noguera =

Spanish footballer

Personal information
- Full name: Joan Noguera Artero
- Date of birth: 5 December 1991 (age 34)
- Place of birth: Bagà, Spain
- Height: 1.85 m (6 ft 1 in)
- Position: Centre back

Team information
- Current team: Sant Andreu

Youth career
- 2001–2005: Baganès
- 2005–2007: Avià
- 2007–2009: Puig-reig
- 2009–2010: Gramenet

Senior career*
Years	Team	Apps	(Gls)
2007	Avià	1	(0)
2009	Puig-reig	1	(0)
2010–2011	Gramenet B	10	(0)
2011–2013	Gavà	56	(0)
2013–2015	Sabadell B	61	(5)
2013	Sabadell	2	(0)
2015–	Sant Andreu	9	(0)
- * Club domestic league appearances and goals as of 30 July 2015

Joan Noguera Artero (born 5 December 1991) is a Spanish professional footballer who plays for UE Sant Andreu as a central defender.

== Club career ==
Born in Bagà, Barcelona, Catalonia, Noguera began playing football with local team CCR Baganès, followed by spells with UE Avià and CE Puig-reig. He made his senior debuts with lowly UE Avià in the 2006–07 campaign, but later moved to neighbouring UDA Gramenet, being assigned to the Juvenil squad. Noguera was promoted to the reserves in the 2010 summer, and a year later joined CF Gavà, also in the same region.

On 27 June 2013, Noguera signed with CE Sabadell FC, being assigned to the B-team. He made his first-team debut on 18 August, coming on as a late substitute in a 4–0 home victory against RCD Mallorca. In July 2015, he moved to UE Sant Andreu.
