= CF Lloret =

Spanish association football club

Lloret
- Full name: Club de Futbol Lloret
- Founded: 1921; 105 years ago
- Ground: Municipal, Lloret de Mar, Catalonia, Spain
- Capacity: 400
- Chairman: Eduard Coloma
- Manager: Albert Batllosera
- League: Primera Catalana – Group 1
- 2025–26: Primera Catalana – Group 1, 3rd of 16
- Website: https://www.cflloret.cat/
Home colours	Away colours

Club de Futbol Lloret is a Catalan Spanish football team based in Lloret de Mar, in the autonomous community of Catalonia. Founded in 1921, it plays in Primera Catalana – Group 1, holding home games at Camp de Futbol Municipal, with a capacity of 400 people.

== Season to season ==
Season	Tier	Division	Place	Copa del Rey
1943–44	6	2ª Reg.	4th	
1944–45	8	3ª Reg.	3rd	
1945–46	6	2ª Reg.	7th	
1946–47	6	3ª Reg.	10th	
1947–48	6	3ª Reg.		
1948–49	6	3ª Reg.		
1949–50	6	3ª Reg.		
1950–51	6	3ª Reg.		
1951–52	6	3ª Reg.		
1952–53	6	3ª Reg.		
1953–54	6	3ª Reg.		
1954–55	6	3ª Reg.		
1955–56	5	2ª Reg.	11th	
1956–57	5	2ª Reg.	2nd	
1957–58	4	1ª Reg.	19th	
1958–59	5	2ª Reg.	2nd	
1959–60	4	1ª Reg.	20th	
1960–61	4	1ª Reg.	20th	
1961–62	4	1ª Reg.	2nd	
1962–63	4	1ª Reg.	5th	

Season	Tier	Division	Place	Copa del Rey
1963–64	4	1ª Reg.	7th	
1964–65	4	1ª Reg.	12th	
1965–66	4	1ª Reg.	1st	
1966–67	3	3ª	4th	
1967–68	3	3ª	6th	
1968–69	3	3ª	14th	
1969–70	3	3ª	15th	Second round
1970–71	4	Reg. Pref.	7th	
1971–72	4	Reg. Pref.	9th	
1972–73	4	Reg. Pref.	8th	
1973–74	4	Reg. Pref.	20th	
1974–75	5	1ª Reg.	2nd	
1975–76	5	1ª Reg.	6th	
1976–77	5	1ª Reg.	7th	
1977–78	6	1ª Reg.	2nd	
1978–79	5	Reg. Pref.	16th	
1979–80	5	Reg. Pref.	11th	
1980–81	5	Reg. Pref.	2nd	
1981–82	4	3ª	12th	
1982–83	4	3ª	5th	

Season	Tier	Division	Place	Copa del Rey
1983–84	4	3ª	2nd	Second round
1984–85	4	3ª	2nd	First round
1985–86	4	3ª	13th	First round
1986–87	4	3ª	11th	
1987–88	4	3ª	17th	
1988–89	4	3ª	9th	
1989–90	4	3ª	3rd	
1990–91	4	3ª	18th	First round
1991–92	5	1ª Cat.	12th	
1992–93	5	1ª Cat.	18th	
1993–94	5	1ª Cat.	20th	
1994–95	6	Pref. Terr.	9th	
1995–96	6	Pref. Terr.	7th	
1996–97	6	Pref. Terr.	12th	
1997–98	6	Pref. Terr.	6th	
1998–99	6	Pref. Terr.	15th	
1999–2000	7	1ª Terr.	2nd	
2000–01	6	Pref. Terr.	4th	
2001–02	6	Pref. Terr.	17th	
2002–03	7	1ª Terr.	11th	

Season	Tier	Division	Place	Copa del Rey
2003–04	7	1ª Terr.	4th	
2004–05	7	1ª Terr.	8th	
2005–06	7	1ª Terr.	5th	
2006–07	7	1ª Terr.	2nd	
2007–08	6	Pref. Terr.	8th	
2008–09	6	Pref. Terr.	15th	
2009–10	7	1ª Terr.	3rd	
2010–11	7	1ª Terr.	1st	
2011–12	5	1ª Cat.	9th	
2012–13	5	1ª Cat.	13th	
2013–14	5	1ª Cat.	12th	
2014–15	5	1ª Cat.	7th	
2015–16	5	1ª Cat.	13th	
2016–17	5	1ª Cat.	6th	
2017–18	5	1ª Cat.	14th	
2018–19	5	1ª Cat.	9th	
2019–20	5	1ª Cat.	11th	
2020–21	5	1ª Cat.	2nd	
2021–22	6	1ª Cat.	2nd	
2022–23	6	1ª Cat.	6th	

Season	Tier	Division	Place	Copa del Rey
2023–24	6	Lliga Elit	9th	
2024–25	6	Lliga Elit	16th	
2025–26	7	1ª Cat.		

- 14 seasons in Tercera División
