= CE Mataró =

Mataró
- Full name: Club Esportiu Mataró
- Founded: 1939
- Ground: Carles Padrós, Mataró, Barcelona, Catalonia, Spain
- Capacity: 4,500
- President: Fran Seijo
- Head coach: Alberto Aybar
- League: Segona Catalana – Group 2
- 2025–26: Segona Catalana – Group 2, 9th of 16
Home colours	Away colours

Club Esportiu Mataró is a Spanish football team based in Mataró, in the autonomous community of Catalonia. Founded in 1939, they currently play in the Segona Catalana – Group 2, holding home games at Municipal Carles Padrós, which has a capacity of 4,500.

The club competes in both association football and futsal, and also possessed a basketball team, whose women's section won three leagues from 1972 to 1974.

== Season to season ==
Season	Tier	Division	Place	Copa del Rey
1939–40	6	2ª Reg. P.	4th	
1940–41	5	1ª Reg. B	3rd	
1941–42	3	1ª Reg. A	7th	
1942–43	3	1ª Reg. A	10th	
1943–44	4	1ª Reg. A	9th	
1944–45	4	1ª Reg. A	9th	
1945–46	4	1ª Reg. A	5th	
1946–47	4	1ª Reg.	4th	
1947–48	4	1ª Reg. A	1st	
1948–49	4	1ª Reg. A	2nd	
1949–50	3	3ª	1st	
1950–51	3	3ª	7th	
1951–52	3	3ª	5th	
1952–53	3	3ª	2nd	
1953–54	3	3ª	1st	
1954–55	3	3ª	5th	
1955–56	3	3ª	9th	
1956–57	3	3ª	15th	
1957–58	3	3ª	5th	
1958–59	3	3ª	11th	

Season	Tier	Division	Place	Copa del Rey
1959–60	3	3ª	4th	
1960–61	3	3ª	3rd	
1961–62	3	3ª	5th	
1962–63	3	3ª	3rd	
1963–64	3	3ª	13th	
1964–65	3	3ª	14th	
1965–66	3	3ª	8th	
1966–67	3	3ª	16th	
1967–68	4	1ª Reg.	7th	
1968–69	4	Reg. Pref.	1st	
1969–70	3	3ª	8th	
1970–71	3	3ª	20th	First round
1971–72	4	Reg. Pref.	13th	
1972–73	4	Reg. Pref.	9th	
1973–74	4	Reg. Pref.	5th	
1974–75	4	Reg. Pref.	13th	
1975–76	4	Reg. Pref.	17th	
1976–77	5	1ª Reg.	9th	
1977–78	6	1ª Reg.	3rd	
1978–79	6	1ª Reg.	1st	

Season	Tier	Division	Place	Copa del Rey
1979–80	5	Reg. Pref.	2nd	
1980–81	4	3ª	12th	
1981–82	4	3ª	15th	
1982–83	4	3ª	20th	
1983–84	5	Reg. Pref.	13th	
1984–85	5	Reg. Pref.	12th	
1985–86	5	Reg. Pref.	18th	
1986–87	6	1ª Reg.	3rd	
1987–88	6	1ª Reg.	3rd	
1988–89	6	1ª Reg.	2nd	
1989–90	6	1ª Reg.	6th	
1990–91	6	1ª Reg.	5th	
1991–92	7	1ª Terr.	2nd	
1992–93	6	Pref. Terr.	3rd	
1993–94	6	Pref. Terr.	2nd	
1994–95	5	1ª Cat.	2nd	
1995–96	4	3ª	10th	
1996–97	4	3ª	9th	
1997–98	4	3ª	3rd	
1998–99	4	3ª	4th	

Season	Tier	Division	Place	Copa del Rey
1999–2000	4	3ª	3rd	
2000–01	3	2ª B	15th	
2001–02	3	2ª B	8th	
2002–03	3	2ª B	13th	Preliminary
2003–04	3	2ª B	18th	
2004–05	4	3ª	2nd	
2005–06	4	3ª	11th	
2006–07	4	3ª	6th	
2007–08	4	3ª	16th	
2008–09	4	3ª	18th	
2009–10	5	1ª Cat.	10th	
2010–11	6	Pref. Terr.	(R)	
2011–12	6	2ª Cat.	6th	
2012–13	6	2ª Cat.	9th	
2013–14	6	2ª Cat.	12th	
2014–15	6	2ª Cat.	1st	
2015–16	5	1ª Cat.	15th	
2016–17	6	2ª Cat.	2nd	
2017–18	6	2ª Cat.	3rd	
2018–19	6	2ª Cat.	1st	

Season	Tier	Division	Place	Copa del Rey
2019–20	5	1ª Cat.	7th	
2020–21	5	1ª Cat.	4th	
2021–22	6	1ª Cat.	5th	
2022–23	6	1ª Cat.	7th	
2023–24	7	1ª Cat.	15th	
2024–25	8	2ª Cat.	8th	
2025–26	8	2ª Cat.		

- 4 seasons in Segunda División B
- 33 seasons in Tercera División

== Former players ==
- (Spain) Cesc Fàbregas (youth)
