= Artero =

Artero is a Spanish surname. Notable people with the surname include:

- Javier Artero (born 1975), Spanish footballer
- Joan Artero (born 1991), Spanish footballer
- Juanjo Artero (born 1965), Spanish actor
- Matilde Artero, Spanish actress
- Ricard Artero (born 2003), Spanish footballer
