= UDA Gramenet B =

Gramenet B
- Full name: Unión Deportiva Atlético Gramenet "B"
- Nickname(s): Grama
- Founded: 1995
- Dissolved: 2015
- Ground: Nou Municipal, Santa Coloma, Catalonia, Spain
- Capacity: 5,000
- 2014–15: Tercera Catalana, retired
Home colours	Away colours

Unión Deportiva Atlético Gramenet "B", usually known as Gramenet B, was a Spanish football team based in Santa Coloma de Gramenet, in the autonomous community of Catalonia. Founded in 1995 after a merger with CD Milán, it was the reserve team of UDA Gramenet, and was dissolved in 2015.

== Season to season ==
Season	Tier	Division	Place
1995–96	5	1ª Cat.	4th
1996–97	5	1ª Cat.	11th
1997–98	5	1ª Cat.	4th
1998–99	5	1ª Cat.	15th
1999–2000	5	1ª Cat.	6th
2000–01	5	1ª Cat.	2nd
2001–02	4	3ª	11th
2002–03	4	3ª	9th
2003–04	4	3ª	20th
2004–05	5	1ª Cat.	8th

Season	Tier	Division	Place
2005–06	5	1ª Cat.	4th
2006–07	5	1ª Cat.	12th
2007–08	5	1ª Cat.	18th
2008–09	6	Pref. Terr.	2nd
2009–10	5	1ª Cat.	5th
2010–11	5	1ª Cat.	14th
2011–12	5	1ª Cat.	12th
2012–13	5	1ª Cat.	17th
2013–14	6	2ª Cat.	15th
2014–15	7	3ª Cat.	(R)

- 3 seasons in Tercera División
