= UA Horta =

Spanish association football club

Horta
- Full name: Unió Atlètica d'Horta
- Founded: 1922; 104 years ago
- Ground: Municipal d’Horta, Barcelona, Catalonia, Spain
- Capacity: 2,500
- President: Francisco Carmona
- Manager: Victor Valdes
- League: Lliga Elit
- 2024–25: Lliga Elit, 5th of 16
| Home colours | Away colours |

Unió Atlètica d'Horta is a football team based in Barcelona. Founded in 1922, it plays in Lliga Elit. Its stadium is Municipal d’Horta with a capacity of 2,500 seats.

== History ==
The club was founded on April 18, 1922, after the merge of Club Esportiu Autonomia and l'Athletic Baseball Club.

== Season to season ==
| Season | Tier | Division | Place | Copa del Rey |
|---|---|---|---|---|
| 1930–31 | 5 | 2ª Reg. P. | 14th | |
| 1931–32 | 5 | 2ª Reg. P. | 2nd | |
| 1932–33 | 5 | 2ª Reg. | | |
| 1933–34 | 5 | 2ª Reg. | | |
| 1934–35 | 5 | 2ª Reg. | | |
| 1935–36 | 5 | 2ª Reg. | | |
| 1939–40 | 5 | 1ª Reg. B | 8th | |
| 1940–41 | 4 | 1ª Reg. A | 8th | |
| 1941–42 | 3 | 1ª Reg. A | 11th | |
| 1942–43 | 4 | 1ª Reg. B | 4th | |
| 1943–44 | 4 | 1ª Reg. A | 9th | |
| 1944–45 | 5 | 1ª Reg. B | 5th | |
| 1945–46 | 5 | 1ª Reg. B | 2nd | |
| 1946–47 | 4 | 1ª Reg. | 11th | |
| 1947–48 | 4 | 1ª Reg. A | 9th | |
| 1948–49 | 4 | 1ª Reg. A | 17th | |
| 1949–50 | 4 | 1ª Reg. A | 11th | |
| 1950–51 | 4 | 1ª Reg. A | 4th | |
| 1951–52 | 4 | 1ª Reg. A | 1st | |
| 1952–53 | 3 | 3ª | 15th | |

| Season | Tier | Division | Place | Copa del Rey |
|---|---|---|---|---|
| 1953–54 | 3 | 3ª | 19th | |
| 1954–55 | 3 | 3ª | 5th | |
| 1955–56 | 3 | 3ª | 12th | |
| 1956–57 | 3 | 3ª | 17th | |
| 1957–58 | 3 | 3ª | 21st | |
| 1958–59 | 3 | 3ª | 17th | |
| 1959–60 | 4 | 1ª Reg. | 11th | |
| 1960–61 | 4 | 1ª Reg. | 5th | |
| 1961–62 | 4 | 1ª Reg. | 5th | |
| 1962–63 | 4 | 1ª Reg. | 3rd | |
| 1963–64 | 4 | 1ª Reg. | 15th | |
| 1964–65 | 4 | 1ª Reg. | 10th | |
| 1965–66 | 4 | 1ª Reg. | 10th | |
| 1966–67 | 4 | 1ª Reg. | 15th | |
| 1967–68 | 4 | 1ª Reg. | 10th | |
| 1968–69 | 4 | Reg. Pref. | 10th | |
| 1969–70 | 4 | Reg. Pref. | 5th | |
| 1970–71 | 4 | Reg. Pref. | 19th | |
| 1971–72 | 5 | 1ª Reg. | 14th | |
| 1972–73 | 5 | 1ª Reg. | 4th | |

| Season | Tier | Division | Place | Copa del Rey |
|---|---|---|---|---|
| 1973–74 | 5 | 1ª Reg. | 4th | |
| 1974–75 | 5 | 1ª Reg. | 6th | |
| 1975–76 | 5 | 1ª Reg. | 1st | |
| 1976–77 | 4 | Reg. Pref. | 12th | |
| 1977–78 | 4 | 3ª | 16th | |
| 1978–79 | 4 | 3ª | 19th | |
| 1979–80 | 4 | 3ª | 20th | |
| 1980–81 | 4 | 3ª | 18th | |
| 1981–82 | 4 | 3ª | 17th | |
| 1982–83 | 4 | 3ª | 7th | |
| 1983–84 | 4 | 3ª | 15th | |
| 1984–85 | 4 | 3ª | 10th | |
| 1985–86 | 4 | 3ª | 17th | |
| 1986–87 | 5 | Reg. Pref. | 10th | |
| 1987–88 | 5 | Reg. Pref. | 1st | |
| 1988–89 | 4 | 3ª | 14th | |
| 1989–90 | 4 | 3ª | 17th | |
| 1990–91 | 4 | 3ª | 17th | |
| 1991–92 | 4 | 3ª | 18th | |
| 1992–93 | 5 | 1ª Cat. | 6th | |

| Season | Tier | Division | Place | Copa del Rey |
|---|---|---|---|---|
| 1993–94 | 5 | 1ª Cat. | 4th | |
| 1994–95 | 4 | 3ª | 5th | |
| 1995–96 | 4 | 3ª | 18th | |
| 1996–97 | 5 | 1ª Cat. | 1st | |
| 1997–98 | 4 | 3ª | 7th | |
| 1998–99 | 4 | 3ª | 8th | |
| 1999–2000 | 4 | 3ª | 19th | |
| 2000–01 | 5 | 1ª Cat. | 5th | |
| 2001–02 | 5 | 1ª Cat. | 17th | |
| 2002–03 | 5 | 1ª Cat. | 13th | |
| 2003–04 | 5 | 1ª Cat. | 8th | |
| 2004–05 | 5 | 1ª Cat. | 14th | |
| 2005–06 | 5 | 1ª Cat. | 20th | |
| 2006–07 | 6 | Pref. Terr. | 5th | |
| 2007–08 | 6 | Pref. Terr. | 10th | |
| 2008–09 | 6 | Pref. Terr. | 11th | |
| 2009–10 | 6 | Pref. Terr. | 2nd | |
| 2010–11 | 6 | Pref. Terr. | 7th | |
| 2011–12 | 6 | 2ª Cat. | 1st | |
| 2012–13 | 5 | 1ª Cat. | 3rd | |

| Season | Tier | Division | Place | Copa del Rey |
|---|---|---|---|---|
| 2013–14 | 5 | 1ª Cat. | 4th | |
| 2014–15 | 5 | 1ª Cat. | 11th | |
| 2015–16 | 5 | 1ª Cat. | 3rd | |
| 2016–17 | 5 | 1ª Cat. | 1st | |
| 2017–18 | 4 | 3ª | 11th | |
| 2018–19 | 4 | 3ª | 3rd | |
| 2019–20 | 4 | 3ª | 12th | |
| 2020–21 | 4 | 3ª | 10th / 8th | |
| 2021–22 | 6 | 1ª Cat. | 9th | |
| 2022–23 | 6 | 1ª Cat. | 6th | |
| 2023–24 | 6 | Lliga Elit | 4th | |
| 2024–25 | 6 | Lliga Elit | 5th | |
| 2025–26 | 6 | Lliga Elit | | |

- 29 seasons in Tercera División
