= CD Tortosa =

Spanish football team

Tortosa
- Full name: Club Deportiu Tortosa
- Founded: 1921; 104 years ago
- Dissolved: 2023
- Ground: Estadio Municipal, Tortosa, Catalonia, Spain
- Capacity: 6,000
- Chairman: Ximo Rambla
- Manager: Carlos Blanch
- 2022–23: Segona Catalana – Group 6 B, 1st of 10
Home colours	Away colours

Club Deportiu Tortosa was a Spanish football team based in Tortosa, in the autonomous community of Catalonia. Founded in 1921, it last played in Segona Catalana – Group 6 B, holding home matches at Estadio Municipal de Tortosa, with a 6,000-seat capacity.

In June 2023, Tortosa merged with Ebre EF to create CF Tortosa Ebre.

== Season to season ==
Season	Tier	Division	Place	Copa del Rey
1942–43	5	2ª Reg.	1st	
1943–44	5	1ª Reg. B	2nd	
1944–45	4	1ª Reg. A	3rd	
1945–46	3	3ª	4th	
1946–47	3	3ª	8th	
1947–48	3	3ª	13th	Second round
1948–49	4	1ª Reg. A	1st	
1949–50	3	3ª	2nd	
1950–51	3	3ª	5th	
1951–52	3	3ª	2nd	
1952–53	3	3ª	13th	
1953–54	3	3ª	12th	
1954–55	3	3ª	2nd	
1955–56	3	3ª	2nd	
1956–57	3	3ª	8th	
1957–58	3	3ª	11th	
1958–59	3	3ª	9th	
1959–60	3	3ª	15th	
1960–61	4	1ª Reg.	2nd	
1961–62	3	3ª	11th	

Season	Tier	Division	Place	Copa del Rey
1962–63	3	3ª	10th	
1963–64	3	3ª	7th	
1964–65	3	3ª	12th	
1965–66	3	3ª	11th	
1966–67	3	3ª	9th	
1967–68	3	3ª	9th	
1968–69	3	3ª	6th	
1969–70	3	3ª	6th	Fourth round
1970–71	3	3ª	14th	First round
1971–72	3	3ª	12th	Second round
1972–73	3	3ª	9th	First round
1973–74	3	3ª	10th	Second round
1974–75	3	3ª	20th	First round
1975–76	4	Reg. Pref.	10th	
1976–77	4	Reg. Pref.	16th	
1977–78	5	Reg. Pref.	19th	
1978–79	6	1ª Reg.	11th	
1979–80	6	1ª Reg.	6th	
1980–81	6	1ª Reg.	1st	
1981–82	5	Reg. Pref.	3rd	

Season	Tier	Division	Place	Copa del Rey
1982–83	4	3ª	17th	
1983–84	4	3ª	19th	
1984–85	5	Reg. Pref.	8th	
1985–86	5	Reg. Pref.	10th	
1986–87	5	Reg. Pref.	2nd	
1987–88	4	3ª	12th	
1988–89	4	3ª	19th	
1989–90	5	Reg. Pref.	1st	
1990–91	4	3ª	9th	
1991–92	4	3ª	12th	
1992–93	4	3ª	17th	
1993–94	4	3ª	14th	
1994–95	4	3ª	12th	
1995–96	4	3ª	9th	
1996–97	4	3ª	5th	
1997–98	4	3ª	4th	
1998–99	4	3ª	11th	
1999–2000	4	3ª	12th	
2000–01	4	3ª	17th	
2001–02	5	1ª Cat.	4th	

Season	Tier	Division	Place	Copa del Rey
2002–03	4	3ª	17th	
2003–04	5	1ª Cat.	18th	
2004–05	6	Pref. Terr.	1st	
2005–06	5	1ª Cat.	10th	
2006–07	5	1ª Cat.	14th	
2007–08	5	1ª Cat.	10th	
2008–09	5	1ª Cat.	10th	
2009–10	5	1ª Cat.	15th	
2010–11	5	1ª Cat.	11th	
2011–12	5	1ª Cat.	17th	
2012–13	6	2ª Cat.	6th	
2013–14	6	2ª Cat.	3rd	
2014–15	6	2ª Cat.	8th	
2015–16	6	2ª Cat.	2nd	
2016–17	6	2ª Cat.	1st	
2017–18	5	1ª Cat.	16th	
2018–19	6	2ª Cat.	3rd	
2019–20	6	2ª Cat.	3rd	
2020–21	6	2ª Cat.	3rd	
2021–22	7	2ª Cat.	3rd	

Season	Tier	Division	Place	Copa del Rey
2022–23	7	2ª Cat.	1st	

- 44 seasons in Tercera División

== Notable players ==
- (Spain) Àngel Rangel

== Sources ==
- Official website
