= UE Rubí =

Association football club in Spain

Rubí
- Full name: Unió Esportiva Rubí
- Founded: 30 June 1912; 113 years ago
- Ground: Municipal de Can Rosés; Rubí, Barcelona, Cataluña Spain.
- Capacity: 6,000
- President: Josep Alcalá
- Head coach: Jordi Peris
- League: Lliga Elit
- 2024–25: Lliga Elit, 8th of 16
- Website: https://uerubi1912.com
Home colours	Away colours

The Unió Esportiva Rubí is a football club in Rubí, Barcelona, which is currently playing in Lliga Elit.

== History ==
On 30 June 1912, a group of young people in Rubí, after playing matches against clubs from Barcelona a month before, decided to form a football club that would represent the town. Their first match was played against a team from the neighboring town of Castellbisbal. The club was only formally created in 1917, when Barcelona-born businessman Joan Franch i Vilarnau (who was on vacation with his family in Rubí during the summer) proposed to formally create the club under the name Rubí Fútbol Club, which remained in effect until their dissolution in 1927. The club was refounded in 1932 with their current name: Unió Esportiva Rubí.

After the Civil War, the club started to feature in the Catalan Segunda Regional, playing in the regional leagues until 1991, when they achieved promotion to Tercera División. In the 1992–93 season, they achieved a first-ever promotion to Segunda División B after finishing third, but only remained in the category for one year before suffering relegation.

Back to the regional leagues in 1998, Rubí only returned to the fourth tier in 2011.

=== Controversy over the date of foundation and fake background ===
In the past 30 years, the club has proposed several founding dates, many of them have been wrong, even claiming that the club was founded in 1902 and therefore was the centenary 2002. This theory was disproved by historian Josep Maria Freixes rubinense that through his historical research has shown that football rubinense origin and genesis of the club is dated 1912, which was recognized by the Consell Català for Sport (Catalan Sports Council) in 2005 as for the Catalan Football Federation in 2006. The club, however, kept between 2003 and 2011 to 1902 as its founding until the end of June 2011, when the institution was finally recognized in 1912 as its foundation and at the same time, confirming the year 2012 as his centennial celebration.

== Season to season ==
Season	Tier	Division	Place	Copa del Rey
1940–41	7	2ª Reg.	5th	
1941–42	6	2ª Reg.		
1942–43	5	2ª Reg.	4th	
1943–44	6	2ª Reg.	4th	
1944–45	7	2ª Reg.	1st	
1945–46	6	2ª Reg. P.	5th	
1946–47	7	4ª Reg.	2nd	
1947–48	6	2ª Reg.	5th	
1948–49	6	2ª Reg.	7th	
1949–50	6	2ª Reg.	7th	
1950–51	6	2ª Reg.	10th	
1951–52	6	2ª Reg.	7th	
1952–53	6	2ª Reg.	6th	
1953–54	6	Liga Com.	2nd	
1954–55	5	2ª Reg.	8th	
1955–56	5	2ª Reg.	4th	
1956–57	4	1ª Reg.	15th	
1957–58	4	1ª Reg.	17th	
1958–59	4	1ª Reg.	11th	
1959–60	4	1ª Reg.	5th	

Season	Tier	Division	Place	Copa del Rey
1960–61	4	1ª Reg.	3rd	
1961–62	4	1ª Reg.	13th	
1962–63	4	1ª Reg.	9th	
1963–64	4	1ª Reg.	9th	
1964–65	4	1ª Reg.	17th	
1965–66	4	1ª Reg.	19th	
1966–67	4	1ª Reg.	17th	
1967–68	5	2ª Reg.	5th	
1968–69	5	1ª Reg.	1st	
1969–70	4	Reg. Pref.	18th	
1970–71	5	1ª Reg.	16th	
1971–72	5	1ª Reg.	9th	
1972–73	5	1ª Reg.	16th	
1973–74	6	2ª Reg.	2nd	
1974–75	5	1ª Reg.	4th	
1975–76	5	1ª Reg.	3rd	
1976–77	5	1ª Reg.	16th	
1977–78	6	1ª Reg.	3rd	
1978–79	6	1ª Reg.	3rd	
1979–80	6	1ª Reg.	12th	

Season	Tier	Division	Place	Copa del Rey
1980–81	6	1ª Reg.	3rd	
1981–82	6	1ª Reg.	1st	
1982–83	5	Reg. Pref.	7th	
1983–84	5	Reg. Pref.	15th	
1984–85	5	Reg. Pref.	11th	
1985–86	5	Reg. Pref.	16th	
1986–87	6	1ª Reg.	7th	
1987–88	6	1ª Reg.	1st	
1988–89	5	Reg. Pref.	6th	
1989–90	5	Reg. Pref.	11th	
1990–91	5	Reg. Pref.	2nd	
1991–92	4	3ª	13th	
1992–93	4	3ª	3rd	
1993–94	3	2ª B	17th	Third round
1994–95	4	3ª	15th	First round
1995–96	4	3ª	17th	
1996–97	4	3ª	12th	
1997–98	4	3ª	18th	
1998–99	5	1ª Cat.	17th	
1999–2000	6	Pref. Terr.	1st	

Season	Tier	Division	Place	Copa del Rey
2000–01	5	1ª Cat.	14th	
2001–02	5	1ª Cat.	19th	
2002–03	6	Pref. Terr.	1st	
2003–04	5	1ª Cat.	2nd	
2004–05	4	3ª	13th	
2005–06	4	3ª	19th	
2006–07	5	1ª Cat.	20th	
2007–08	6	Pref. Terr.	4th	
2008–09	6	Pref. Terr.	1st	
2009–10	5	1ª Cat.	8th	
2010–11	5	1ª Cat.	3rd	
2011–12	4	3ª	11th	
2012–13	4	3ª	11th	
2013–14	4	3ª	5th	
2014–15	4	3ª	8th	
2015–16	4	3ª	18th	
2016–17	5	1ª Cat.	16th	
2017–18	6	2ª Cat.	2nd	
2018–19	5	1ª Cat.	12th	
2019–20	5	1ª Cat.	9th	

Season	Tier	Division	Place	Copa del Rey
2020–21	5	1ª Cat.	7th	
2021–22	6	1ª Cat.	10th	
2022–23	6	1ª Cat.	2nd	
2023–24	6	Lliga Elit	8th	First round
2024–25	6	Lliga Elit	8th	
2025–26	6	Lliga Elit		

- 1 season in Segunda División B
- 13 seasons in Tercera División

== Squad ==
As of 1 November 2023. Note: Flags indicate national team as defined under FIFA eligibility rules; some limited exceptions apply. Players may hold more than one non-FIFA nationality.

No.	Pos.	Nation	Player
1	GK	ESP	Rafa Leva
2	DF	ESP	Aitor Torres
3	MF	ESP	Óscar Morell
4	DF	ESP	Oriol Tenorio
5	DF	ESP	David Picón
6	MF	ESP	Xavi Torres
7	MF	ESP	Adrià Recort
8	MF	ESP	Jordi Masip
9	FW	ESP	Daniel Muela
10	MF	ESP	Pau Albelda
11	FW	ESP	Muñi
13	GK	URU	Iván Capurro

No.	Pos.	Nation	Player
14	FW	ESP	Sergi Monsó
15	DF	ESP	Mario Hervías
16	MF	ESP	Adrià Carricondo
17	MF	ESP	Cristian Mulero
18	FW	ESP	Marc Rodriguez
19	MF	MTN	Abde
20	DF	ESP	Alex Ruiz
21	MF	ESP	Sergio Mulero
23	MF	ESP	Marc Cintas
24	FW	ESP	Eloi Moral
25	GK	CHN	Zhang Donghai

== Honours ==
- Regional Preferente de Cataluña (3): 1999–2000, 2002–03, 2008–09.

== Bibliography ==
There are books published by Josep Maria Freixes about EU Ruby:

- Freixes Trujillo, Josep Maria: Unió Esportiva Rubí: 85 anys de futbol (1912-1997). Fecha de publicación: 1997 - ISBN 84-605-6945-4
- Freixes Trujillo, Josep Maria: La Unió Esportiva Rubí, una història (1912-2004). Fecha de publicación: 2004 - ISBN 84-609-2741-5
