= CE Manresa =

Association football club in Spain

Manresa
- Full name: Centre d'Esports Manresa
- Founded: 1916
- Ground: Nou Estadi Municipal, Manresa, Catalonia, Spain
- Capacity: 3,660
- President: José Luis Correa Busto
- Head coach: Sergi Trullàs
- League: Segunda Federación – Group 2
- 2025–26: Tercera Federación – Group 5, 1st of 18 (champions)
Home colours	Away colours

Centre d'Esports Manresa is a Catalan Spanish football team based in Manresa, in the autonomous community of Catalonia. Founded in 1916, it plays in Segunda Federación – Group 2, holding home games at Nou Estadi Municipal del Congost, with a capacity of 3,000 spectators.

== History ==
The club was founded in 1906, but it only adopted its current name Center d'Esports Manresa in 1916 after a merger with the club Catalonia.

== Season to season ==
Season	Tier	Division	Place	Copa del Rey
1928–29	5	2ª Reg. P.	1st	
1929–30	4	1ª Reg.	6th	
1930–31	5	2ª Reg. P.	12th	
1931–32	5	2ª Reg. P.	7th	
1932–33	6	2ª Reg. P.		
1933–34	6	2ª Reg. P.		
1934–35	6	2ª Reg. P.		
1935–36	7	3ª Reg.		
1939–40	6	2ª Reg. P.	4th	
1940–41	5	1ª Reg. B	1st	
1941–42	3	1ª Reg. A	12th	
1942–43	3	1ª Reg. A	7th	
1943–44	4	1ª Reg. A	5th	
1944–45	4	1ª Reg. A	4th	
1945–46	4	1ª Reg. A	6th	
1946–47	4	1ª Reg. A	7th	
1947–48	4	1ª Reg. A	4th	
1948–49	4	1ª Reg. A	5th	
1949–50	4	1ª Reg. A	2nd	
1950–51	3	3ª	9th	

Season	Tier	Division	Place	Copa del Rey
1951–52	3	3ª	5th	
1952–53	3	3ª	7th	
1953–54	3	3ª	5th	
1954–55	3	3ª	2nd	
1955–56	3	3ª	1st	
1956–57	3	3ª	3rd	
1957–58	3	3ª	12th	
1958–59	3	3ª	8th	
1959–60	3	3ª	2nd	
1960–61	3	3ª	2nd	
1961–62	3	3ª	7th	
1962–63	3	3ª	5th	
1963–64	3	3ª	14th	
1964–65	3	3ª	15th	
1965–66	3	3ª	15th	
1966–67	3	3ª	13th	
1967–68	3	3ª	20th	
1968–69	4	Reg. Pref.	14th	
1969–70	4	Reg. Pref.	3rd	
1970–71	4	Reg. Pref.	14th	

Season	Tier	Division	Place	Copa del Rey
1971–72	4	Reg. Pref.	5th	
1972–73	4	Reg. Pref.	16th	
1973–74	4	Reg. Pref.	1st	
1974–75	3	3ª	4th	Third round
1975–76	3	3ª	17th	First round
1976–77	4	Reg. Pref.	17th	
1977–78	5	Reg. Pref.	12th	
1978–79	5	Reg. Pref.	18th	
1979–80	6	1ª Reg.	1st	
1980–81	5	Reg. Pref.	10th	
1981–82	5	Reg. Pref.	2nd	
1982–83	4	3ª	12th	
1983–84	4	3ª	7th	
1984–85	4	3ª	13th	
1985–86	4	3ª	5th	
1986–87	4	3ª	10th	Second round
1987–88	4	3ª	15th	
1988–89	4	3ª	7th	
1989–90	4	3ª	20th	
1990–91	4	Reg. Pref.	1st	

Season	Tier	Division	Place	Copa del Rey
1991–92	4	3ª	11th	
1992–93	4	3ª	19th	
1993–94	4	1ª Cat.	2nd	
1994–95	4	3ª	17th	
1995–96	4	1ª Cat.	9th	
1996–97	4	1ª Cat.	15th	
1997–98	6	Pref. Terr.	1st	
1998–99	4	1ª Cat.	8th	
1999–2000	4	1ª Cat.	12th	
2000–01	4	1ª Cat.	1st	
2001–02	4	3ª	16th	
2002–03	4	3ª	13th	
2003–04	4	3ª	14th	
2004–05	4	3ª	17th	
2005–06	4	3ª	5th	
2006–07	4	3ª	10th	
2007–08	4	3ª	19th	
2008–09	5	1ª Cat.	18th	
2009–10	6	Pref. Terr.	13th	
2010–11	6	Pref. Terr.	5th	

Season	Tier	Division	Place	Copa del Rey
2011–12	5	1ª Cat.	17th	
2012–13	6	2ª Cat.	3rd	
2013–14	6	2ª Cat.	1st	
2014–15	5	1ª Cat.	3rd	
2015–16	5	1ª Cat.	4th	
2016–17	5	1ª Cat.	10th	
2017–18	5	1ª Cat.	2nd	
2018–19	5	1ª Cat.	2nd	
2019–20	4	3ª	10th	
2020–21	4	3ª	5th / 3rd	
2021–22	5	3ª RFEF	1st	
2022–23	4	2ª Fed.	4th	First round
2023–24	4	2ª Fed.	17th	First round
2024–25	5	3ª Fed.	9th	
2025–26	5	3ª Fed.	1st	
2026–27	4	2ª Fed.		First round

- 3 seasons in Segunda Federación
- 40 seasons in Tercera División
- 3 seasons in Tercera Federación/Tercera División RFEF

== Current squad ==
As of 26 September 2025

Note: Flags indicate national team as defined under FIFA eligibility rules; some limited exceptions apply. Players may hold more than one non-FIFA nationality.

No.	Pos.	Nation	Player
1	GK	ESP	Óscar Pulido
2	DF	ESP	Guillem Falgueras
3	DF	ESP	Roger Munells
4	DF	ESP	Pau Guillén
5	DF	ESP	Ton Badía
6	MF	ESP	Manel Montoya
7	MF	ESP	Aleix Díaz
8	MF	ESP	Carlos Portero
9	FW	MAR	Ayoub Al Azami
10	FW	MAR	Moha Ezzarfani
11	FW	ESP	Bamta Bande
12	DF	ESP	Sergi Valls

No.	Pos.	Nation	Player
13	GK	ESP	Quim Borras
14	DF	ESP	Álex Iglesias
15	DF	BRA	Matheus Teixeira
16	MF	SEN	Mor Diop
17	FW	ESP	Joel Montero
18	MF	ESP	Arnau Coromina
19	FW	ESP	David Momoh
20	MF	ESP	Ernest Marinas
21	MF	MAR	Badr El Amerani
22	DF	UGA	Víctor Matovu
23	DF	ESP	Nicolás Olmedo
24	MF	ESP	Marc De Pedro

== Notable former players ==
- (Cuba) Joel Apezteguía
- (Equatorial Guinea) (Spain) Rubén Epitié
- (Philippines) (Spain) Ángel Guirado
