= UE Sants =

Association football club in Spain

Sants
- Full name: Unió Esportiva Sants
- Founded: 26 April 1922; 104 years ago
- Ground: Camp de futbol de l’Energia, Barcelona, Catalonia, Spain
- Capacity: 1,000
- Chairman: Vicenç Olaria
- Manager: Henry Lossio
- League: Primera Catalana – Group 2
- 2024–25: Primera Catalana – Group 2, 9th of 16
- Website: http://www.uesants.cat
Home colours	Away colours

Unió Esportiva Sants is a football team based in Barcelona. Founded in 1922, it plays in Primera Catalana – Group 2. Its stadium is Camp de futbol de l’Energia, with a capacity of 1,000.

It used to have a cycling section that was responsible for organizing the Tour of Catalonia.

== History ==
F.C. Internacional de Barcelona and C.E. Sants merged in UE Sants. It happened on 26 April 1922, and Josep Roig Chovar became the club's first president.

=== Club names ===
- Unió Esportiva Sants - (1922–1939; 1975–)
- Unión Deportiva Sans - (1939–1975)

== Season to season ==
Season	Tier	Division	Place	Copa del Rey
1928–29	4	1ª Reg.	4th	
1929–30	3	3ª	3rd	
1930–31	5	2ª Reg. P.	6th	
1931–32	5	2ª Reg. P.	1st	
1932–33	3	3ª	4th	
1933–34	5	1ª Reg. B	1st	
1934–35	5	1ª Reg. B		
1935–36	5	1ª Reg. B		
1939–40	5	1ª Reg. B	7th	
1940–41	4	1ª Reg. A	4th	
1941–42	3	1ª Reg. A	9th	
1942–43	3	1ª Reg. A	8th	
1943–44	4	1ª Reg. A	4th	
1944–45	4	1ª Reg. A	2nd	
1945–46	3	3ª	5th	
1946–47	3	3ª	6th	
1947–48	3	3ª	11th	Fifth round
1948–49	4	1ª Reg. A	6th	
1949–50	3	3ª	14th	
1950–51	3	3ª	6th	

Season	Tier	Division	Place	Copa del Rey
1951–52	3	3ª	8th	
1952–53	3	3ª	6th	
1953–54	3	3ª	14th	
1954–55	3	3ª	6th	
1955–56	3	3ª	7th	
1956–57	3	3ª	1st	
1957–58	3	3ª	4th	
1958–59	3	3ª	1st	
1959–60	3	3ª	3rd	
1960–61	3	3ª	9th	
1961–62	3	3ª	10th	
1962–63	3	3ª	7th	
1963–64	3	3ª	15th	
1964–65	3	3ª	4th	
1965–66	3	3ª	2nd	
1966–67	3	3ª	6th	
1967–68	3	3ª	16th	
1968–69	4	Reg. Pref.	20th	
1969–70	5	1ª Reg.	3rd	
1970–71	5	1ª Reg.	2nd	

Season	Tier	Division	Place	Copa del Rey
1971–72	4	Reg. Pref.	18th	
1972–73	5	1ª Reg.	12th	
1973–74	5	1ª Reg.	12th	
1974–75	5	1ª Reg.	4th	
1975–76	5	1ª Reg.	15th	
1976–77	5	1ª Reg.	3rd	
1977–78	5	Reg. Pref.	9th	
1978–79	5	Reg. Pref.	17th	
1979–80	5	Reg. Pref.	15th	
1980–81	5	Reg. Pref.	4th	
1981–82	5	Reg. Pref.	4th	
1982–83	5	Reg. Pref.	14th	
1983–84	5	Reg. Pref.	8th	
1984–85	5	Reg. Pref.	5th	
1985–86	5	Reg. Pref.	2nd	
1986–87	5	Reg. Pref.	6th	
1987–88	5	Reg. Pref.	4th	
1988–89	5	Reg. Pref.	3rd	
1989–90	5	Reg. Pref.	5th	
1990–91	5	Reg. Pref.	14th	

Season	Tier	Division	Place	Copa del Rey
1991–92	6	Pref. Terr.	3rd	
1992–93	5	1ª Cat.	1st	
1993–94	3	3ª	15th	
1994–95	3	3ª	11th	
1995–96	3	3ª	14th	
1996–97	3	3ª	21st	
1997–98	5	1ª Cat.	20th	
1998–99	6	Pref. Terr.	12th	
1999–2000	6	Pref. Terr.	13th	
2000–01	6	Pref. Terr.	1st	
2001–02	5	1ª Cat.	14th	
2002–03	5	1ª Cat.	15th	
2003–04	5	1ª Cat.	20th	
2004–05	6	Pref. Terr.	5th	
2005–06	6	Pref. Terr.	13th	
2006–07	6	Pref. Terr.	5th	
2007–08	6	Pref. Terr.	8th	
2008–09	6	Pref. Terr.	2nd	
2009–10	5	1ª Cat.	9th	
2010–11	5	1ª Cat.	17th	

Season	Tier	Division	Place	Copa del Rey
2011–12	5	1ª Cat.	11th	
2012–13	5	1ª Cat.	15th	
2013–14	6	2ª Cat.	2nd	
2014–15	5	1ª Cat.	6th	
2015–16	5	1ª Cat.	6th	
2016–17	5	1ª Cat.	2nd	
2017–18	5	1ª Cat.	2nd	
2018–19	4	3ª	17th	
2019–20	4	3ª	19th	
2020–21	4	3ª	8th / 3rd	
2021–22	5	3ª RFEF	13th	
2022–23	5	3ª Fed	16th	
2023–24	6	Lliga Elit	13th	
2024–25	7	1ª Cat.	9th	
2025–26	7	1ª Cat.		

- 31 seasons in Tercera División
- 1 season in Tercera División RFEF
