= UE Tàrrega =

Association football club in Spain

Tàrrega
- Full name: Unió Esportiva Tàrrega
- Founded: 27 February 1957; 69 years ago
- Ground: Joan Capdevila, Tàrrega, Catalonia, Spain
- Capacity: 3,501
- President: Gerard Caro
- Head coach: Victor Vera Melgar
- League: Primera Catalana – Group 3
- 2024–25: Segona Catalana – Group 5, 2nd of 16 (promoted)
Home colours	Away colours

Unió Esportiva Tàrrega is a Catalan Spanish football team based in Tàrrega, in the autonomous community of Catalonia. Founded in 1957 as the heir of CF Tárrega, it plays in Primera Catalana – Group 3, holding home games at Municipal Joan Capdevila, with a capacity of 3,501 seats.

== Seasons ==
Season	Tier	Division	Place	Copa del Rey
1960–61	5	2ª Reg.	2nd	
1961–62	4	1ª Reg.	7th	
1962–63	4	1ª Reg.	8th	
1963–64	4	1ª Reg.	10th	
1965–65	4	1ª Reg.	15th	
1965–66	4	1ª Reg.	15th	
1966–67	4	1ª Reg.	6th	
1967–68	4	1ª Reg.	4th	
1968–69	4	Reg. Pref.	8th	
1969–70	4	Reg. Pref.	16th	
1970–71	5	1ª Reg.	13th	
1971–72	5	1ª Reg.	2nd	
1972–73	4	Reg. Pref.	12th	
1973–74	4	Reg. Pref.	18th	
1974–75	5	1ª Reg.	5th	
1975–76	5	1ª Reg.	7th	
1976–77	5	1ª Reg.	11th	
1977–78	6	1ª Reg.	16th	
1978–79	6	1ª Reg.	13th	
1979–80	6	1ª Reg.	13th	

Season	Tier	Division	Place	Copa del Rey
1980–81	6	1ª Reg.	12th	
1981–82	6	1ª Reg.	4th	
1982–83	6	1ª Reg.	8th	
1983–84	6	1ª Reg.	5th	
1984–85	5	Reg. Pref.	6th	
1985–86	5	Reg. Pref.	5th	
1986–87	5	Reg. Pref.	13th	
1987–88	5	Reg. Pref.	8th	
1988–89	5	Reg. Pref.	8th	
1989–90	5	Reg. Pref.	6th	
1990–91	5	Reg. Pref.	3rd	
1991–92	5	1ª Cat.	9th	
1992–93	5	1ª Cat.	8th	
1993–94	5	1ª Cat.	3rd	
1994–95	4	3ª	2nd	
1995–96	4	3ª	1st	
1996–97	4	3ª	7th	
1997–98	4	3ª	14th	
1998–99	4	3ª	7th	
1999–2000	4	3ª	13th	

Season	Tier	Division	Place	Copa del Rey
2000–01	4	3ª	11th	
2001–02	4	3ª	10th	
2002–03	4	3ª	10th	
2001–04	4	3ª	13th	
2004–05	4	3ª	20th	
2005–06	5	1ª Cat.	8th	
2006–07	5	1ª Cat.	15th	
2007–08	5	1ª Cat.	6th	
2008–09	5	1ª Cat.	9th	
2009–10	5	1ª Cat.	10th	
2010–11	5	1ª Cat.	4th	
2011–12	5	1ª Cat.	6th	
2012–13	5	1ª Cat.	9th	
2013–14	5	1ª Cat.	4th	
2014–15	5	1ª Cat.	15th	
2015–16	6	2ª Cat.	10th	
2016–17	6	2ª Cat.	2nd	
2017–18	6	2ª Cat.	2nd	
2018–19	5	1ª Cat.	8th	
2019–20	5	1ª Cat.	13th	

Season	Tier	Division	Place	Copa del Rey
2020–21	5	1ª Cat.	9th	
2021–22	6	1ª Cat.	9th	
2022–23	6	1ª Cat.	14th	
2023–24	7	1ª Cat.	15th	
2024–25	8	2ª Cat.	2nd	
2025–26	7	1ª Cat.		

- 11 seasons in Tercera División
