= CP San Cristóbal =

Association football club in Spain

San Cristóbal
- Full name: Centre Parroquial San Cristóbal
- Founded: 1957
- Ground: Municipal Ca n’Anglada, Terrassa, Province of Barcelona, Spain
- Capacity: 1,500
- Chairman: Francesc Manchado
- Manager: Cristian García
- League: Tercera Federación – Group 5
- 2025–26: Tercera Federación – Group 5, 14th of 18
- Website: www.cpsancristobal.com
| Home colours | Away colours |

Centre Parroquial San Cristóbal is a Spanish football team based in Terrassa, Barcelona Province, in the autonomous community of Catalonia. Founded in 1957 it currently plays in Tercera Federación – Group 5, holding home matches at Municipal Ca n’Anglada, with a capacity of 1,500 spectators.

== History ==
The club was founded in 1957 by a group of people from the Parròquia de Ca n'Anglada neighbourhood in Terrassa, among them Emilio Ros Martínez, Jose Anton Amezcua, Juan Fita, Agustín Márquez and others. The following year CP San Cristóbal was registered in the Catalan Football Federation.

== Season to season ==
| Season | Tier | Division | Place | Copa del Rey |
|---|---|---|---|---|
| 1959–60 | 5 | 2ª Reg. | 6th | |
| 1960–61 | 5 | 2ª Reg. | 3rd | |
| 1961–62 | 4 | 1ª Reg. | 8th | |
| 1962–63 | 4 | 1ª Reg. | 13th | |
| 1963–64 | 5 | 2ª Reg. | 10th | |
| 1964–65 | 5 | 2ª Reg. | 5th | |
| 1965–66 | 5 | 2ª Reg. | 4th | |
| 1966–67 | 5 | 2ª Reg. | 10th | |
| 1967–68 | 5 | 2ª Reg. | 5th | |
| 1968–69 | 5 | 1ª Reg. | 18th | |
| 1969–70 | 5 | 1ª Reg. | 18th | |
| 1970–71 | 6 | 2ª Reg. | 13th | |
| 1971–72 | 6 | 2ª Reg. | 11th | |
| 1972–73 | 6 | 2ª Reg. | 4th | |
| 1973–74 | 6 | 2ª Reg. | 1st | |
| 1974–75 | 5 | 1ª Reg. | 6th | |
| 1975–76 | 5 | 1ª Reg. | 12th | |
| 1976–77 | 5 | 1ª Reg. | 20th | |
| 1977–78 | 7 | 2ª Reg. | 3rd | |
| 1978–79 | 7 | 2ª Reg. | 1st | |

| Season | Tier | Division | Place | Copa del Rey |
|---|---|---|---|---|
| 1979–80 | 6 | 1ª Reg. | 4th | |
| 1980–81 | 6 | 1ª Reg. | 1st | |
| 1981–82 | 5 | Reg. Pref. | 8th | |
| 1982–83 | 5 | Reg. Pref. | 8th | |
| 1983–84 | 5 | Reg. Pref. | 9th | |
| 1984–85 | 5 | Reg. Pref. | 13th | |
| 1985–86 | 5 | Reg. Pref. | 5th | |
| 1986–87 | 5 | Reg. Pref. | 1st | |
| 1987–88 | 4 | 3ª | 10th | |
| 1988–89 | 4 | 3ª | 20th | |
| 1989–90 | 5 | Reg. Pref. | 4th | |
| 1990–91 | 5 | Reg. Pref. | 8th | |
| 1991–92 | 5 | 1ª Cat. | 11th | |
| 1992–93 | 5 | 1ª Cat. | 12th | |
| 1993–94 | 5 | 1ª Cat. | 15th | |
| 1994–95 | 5 | 1ª Cat. | 12th | |
| 1995–96 | 5 | 1ª Cat. | 18th | |
| 1996–97 | 6 | Pref. Terr. | 8th | |
| 1997–98 | 6 | Pref. Terr. | 3rd | |
| 1998–99 | 6 | Pref. Terr. | 8th | |

| Season | Tier | Division | Place | Copa del Rey |
|---|---|---|---|---|
| 1999–2000 | 6 | Pref. Terr. | 5th | |
| 2000–01 | 6 | Pref. Terr. | 13th | |
| 2001–02 | 6 | Pref. Terr. | 14th | |
| 2002–03 | 6 | Pref. Terr. | 10th | |
| 2003–04 | 6 | Pref. Terr. | 7th | |
| 2004–05 | 6 | Pref. Terr. | 10th | |
| 2005–06 | 6 | Pref. Terr. | 11th | |
| 2006–07 | 6 | Pref. Terr. | 1st | |
| 2007–08 | 5 | 1ª Cat. | 15th | |
| 2008–09 | 5 | 1ª Cat. | 13th | |
| 2009–10 | 5 | 1ª Cat. | 6th | |
| 2010–11 | 5 | 1ª Cat. | 13th | |
| 2011–12 | 5 | 1ª Cat. | 4th | |
| 2012–13 | 5 | 1ª Cat. | 12th | |
| 2013–14 | 5 | 1ª Cat. | 18th | |
| 2014–15 | 6 | 2ª Cat. | 9th | |
| 2015–16 | 6 | 2ª Cat. | 1st | |
| 2016–17 | 5 | 1ª Cat. | 4th | |
| 2017–18 | 5 | 1ª Cat. | 1st | |
| 2018–19 | 4 | 3ª | 15th | |

| Season | Tier | Division | Place | Copa del Rey |
|---|---|---|---|---|
| 2019–20 | 4 | 3ª | 15th | |
| 2020–21 | 4 | 3ª | 4th / 5th | |
| 2021–22 | 5 | 3ª RFEF | 3rd | |
| 2022–23 | 5 | 3ª Fed. | 3rd | |
| 2023–24 | 5 | 3ª Fed. | 13th | |
| 2024–25 | 5 | 3ª Fed. | 15th | |
| 2025–26 | 5 | 3ª Fed. | 14th | |
| 2026–27 | 5 | 3ª Fed. | | |

- 5 seasons in Tercera División
- 6 seasons in Tercera Federación/Tercera División RFEF

== Achievements ==
- Copa Catalunya
  - Runners-up: 1987–88

== Players ==
=== Current squad ===
As of 23 September 2025.

Note: Flags indicate national team as defined under FIFA eligibility rules; some limited exceptions apply. Players may hold more than one non-FIFA nationality.

| No. | Pos. | Nation | Player |
|---|---|---|---|
| 1 | GK | ESP | Carles Segura |
| 2 | DF | ESP | Héctor Parrado |
| 3 | DF | AND | Joan Cervós |
| 4 | DF | ESP | Ricki Calamardo |
| 5 | DF | AND | Max Llovera |
| 6 | MF | ESP | Guillem Hernández |
| 7 | FW | ESP | Eric Jiménez |
| 8 | MF | ESP | Carlos Olmo |
| 9 | FW | ESP | Ardià Alsina |
| 10 | MF | ESP | Mario Cantí |
| 11 | FW | ESP | Raúl Pérez |
| 12 | DF | ESP | Siaba Paul Mohamed Oulai |
| 13 | GK | ESP | Adrián Tapia |

| No. | Pos. | Nation | Player |
|---|---|---|---|
| 14 | MF | ESP | Álex Fernández |
| 15 | DF | ESP | Álex Otero |
| 16 | DF | ESP | Raúl Ferrer |
| 17 | FW | ESP | Marc Mujal |
| 18 | MF | ESP | Adrián Cabrerizo |
| 19 | FW | ESP | Marc Río |
| 20 | FW | KOR | Keonwoo Kim |
| 21 | FW | ESP | Bafode Cissé |
| 22 | DF | ESP | Salva Torreño |
| 23 | MF | ESP | Aleix Grabulosa |
| 24 | FW | ESP | Ayoub Koubaa |
| 25 | MF | ESP | Nil Abellán |
