= FC Santboià =

Association football club in Spain

Santboià
- Full name: Futbol Club Santboià
- Founded: 1908; 118 years ago
- Ground: Joan Baptista Milà, Sant Boi, Catalonia, Spain
- Capacity: 2,500
- President: Ramón Andreu
- Head coach: Alberto Fernández
- League: Primera Catalana – Group 3
- 2024–25: Primera Catalana – Group 3, 8th of 16
Home colours	Away colours

Futbol Club Santboià is a Spanish football team based in Sant Boi de Llobregat, in the autonomous community of Catalonia. Founded in 1908 it plays in Primera Catalana – Group 3, holding home matches at Estadi Municipal Joan Baptista Milà, with a capacity for 2,500 seats.

== History ==
The club was founded in 1908 as Foot-ball Club Samboyano. Its founders were Joan Baptista Milà, Francesc and Modest Amat, Mateu Puig, Boi Mestres, Jacint Ros, Mateu Parés, Enric Beltràn and the brothers Massana.

== Season to season ==
Season	Tier	Division	Place	Copa del Rey
1939–40	6	2ª Reg. P.	4th	
1940–41	5	1ª Reg. B	7th	
1941–42	4	1ª Reg. B	5th	
1942–43	4	1ª Reg. B	10th	
1943–44	5	1ª Reg. B	5th	
1944–45	5	1ª Reg. B	5th	
1945–46	5	1ª Reg. B	6th	
1946–47	6	3ª Reg.	1st	
1947–48	5	1ª Reg. B	12th	
1948–49	5	1ª Reg. B	9th	
1949–50	5	1ª Reg. B	5th	
1950–51	5	1ª Reg. B	11th	
1951–52	5	1ª Reg. B	9th	
1952–53	5	1ª Reg. B	1st	
1953–54	4	1ª Reg.	14th	
1954–55	4	1ª Reg.	3rd	
1955–56	4	1ª Reg.	8th	
1956–57	3	3ª	9th	
1957–58	3	3ª	10th	
1958–59	3	3ª	11th	

Season	Tier	Division	Place	Copa del Rey
1959–60	3	3ª	11th	
1960–61	3	3ª	16th	
1961–62	4	1ª Reg.	6th	
1962–63	4	1ª Reg.	3rd	
1963–64	4	1ª Reg.	11th	
1964–65	4	1ª Reg.	8th	
1965–66	4	1ª Reg.	5th	
1966–67	4	1ª Reg.	9th	
1967–68	4	1ª Reg.	1st	
1968–69	3	3ª	10th	
1969–70	3	3ª	14th	First round
1970–71	4	Reg. Pref.	20th	
1971–72	5	1ª Reg.	11th	
1972–73	5	1ª Reg.	7th	
1973–74	5	1ª Reg.	9th	
1974–75	5	1ª Reg.	6th	
1975–76	5	1ª Reg.	2nd	
1976–77	5	1ª Reg.	1st	
1977–78	5	Reg. Pref.	13th	
1978–79	5	Reg. Pref.	12th	

Season	Tier	Division	Place	Copa del Rey
1979–80	5	Reg. Pref.	13th	
1980–81	5	Reg. Pref.	1st	
1981–82	4	3ª	16th	
1982–83	4	3ª	10th	
1983–84	4	3ª	11th	
1984–85	4	3ª	18th	
1985–86	5	Reg. Pref.	13th	
1986–87	5	Reg. Pref.	1st	
1987–88	4	3ª	18th	
1988–89	5	Reg. Pref.	11th	
1989–90	5	Reg. Pref.	14th	
1990–91	5	Reg. Pref.	12th	
1991–92	6	Pref. Terr.	2nd	
1992–93	5	1ª Cat.	7th	
1993–94	5	1ª Cat.	7th	
1994–95	5	1ª Cat.	1st	
1995–96	4	3ª	3rd	
1996–97	4	3ª	10th	
1997–98	4	3ª	17th	
1998–99	4	3ª	18th	

Season	Tier	Division	Place	Copa del Rey
1999–2000	5	1ª Cat.	4th	
2000–01	4	3ª	18th	
2001–02	5	1ª Cat.	18th	
2002–03	5	1ª Cat.	9th	
2003–04	5	1ª Cat.	1st	
2004–05	4	3ª	6th	
2005–06	4	3ª	6th	
2006–07	4	3ª	7th	
2007–08	4	3ª	4th	
2008–09	4	3ª	4th	
2009–10	4	3ª	3rd	
2010–11	3	2ª B	20th	
2011–12	4	3ª	6th	
2012–13	4	3ª	15th	
2013–14	4	3ª	18th	
2014–15	5	1ª Cat.	2nd	
2015–16	5	1ª Cat.	2nd	
2016–17	5	1ª Cat.	1st	
2017–18	4	3ª	13th	
2018–19	4	3ª	19th	

Season	Tier	Division	Place	Copa del Rey
2019–20	5	1ª Cat.	3rd	
2020–21	5	1ª Cat.	7th	
2021–22	6	1ª Cat.	6th	
2022–23	6	1ª Cat.	4th	
2023–24	6	Lliga Elit	12th	
2024–25	7	1ª Cat.	8th	
2025–26	7	1ª Cat.		

- 1 season in Segunda División B
- 28 seasons in Tercera División
