= CF Igualada =

Spanish association football club

Igualada
- Full name: Club de Futbol Igualada
- Founded: 1939
- Ground: Les Comes, Igualada, Catalonia, Spain
- Capacity: 4,500
- Chairman: Jaume Berenguer
- Manager: Isidre Tarrès
- League: Primera Catalana – Group 2
- 2024–25: Primera Catalana – Group 2, 4th of 16
Home colours	Away colours

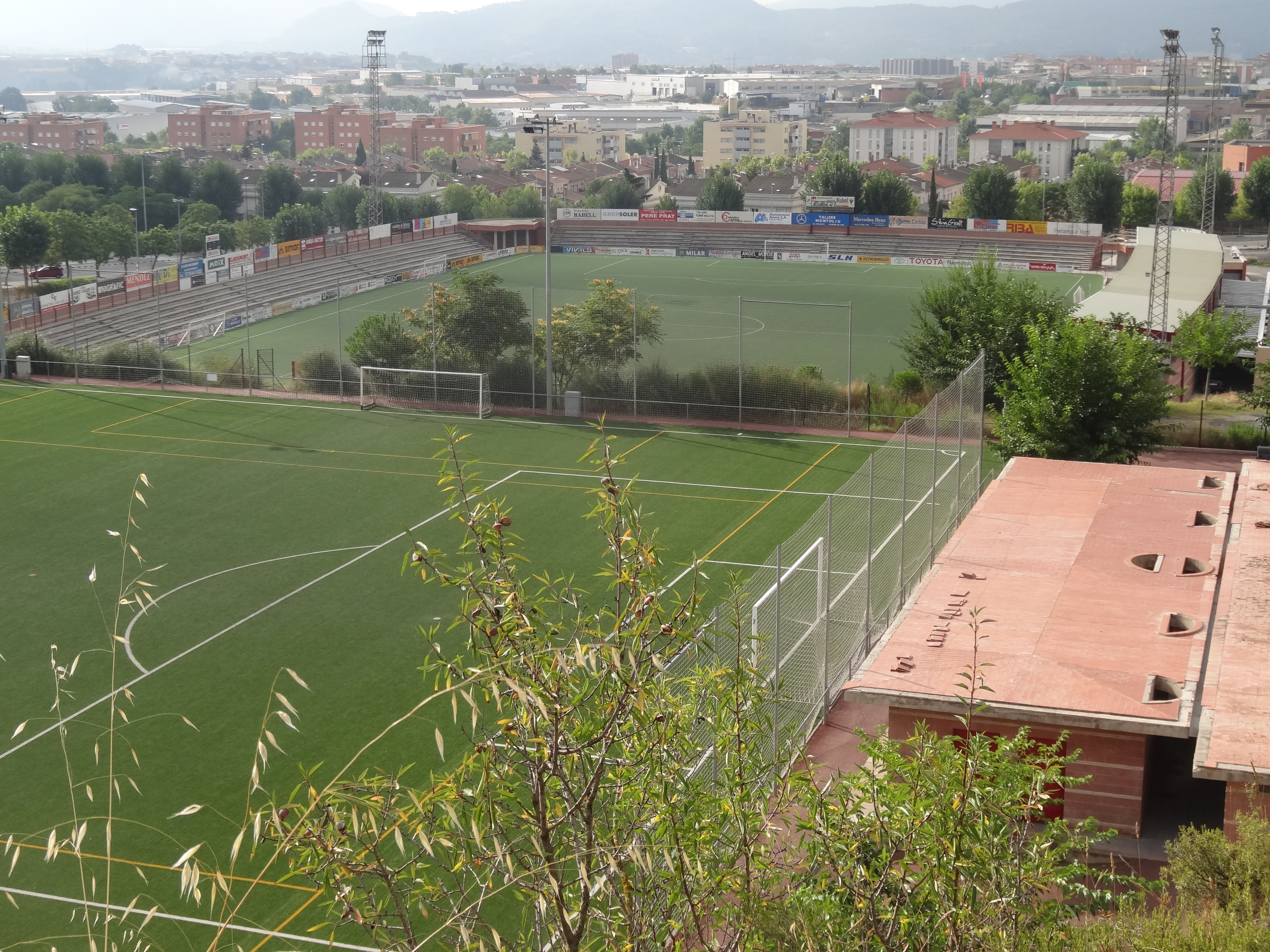
Les Comes stadium

Club de Futbol Igualada is a Spanish football team based in Igualada, in the autonomous community of Catalonia. Founded in 1939, it plays in Primera Catalana – Group 2, holding home matches at Estadi Les Comes, with a capacity of 4,500 seats.

== Season to season ==
Season	Tier	Division	Place	Copa del Rey
1939–40	7	2ª Reg.	6th	
1940–41	6	2ª Reg. P.	3rd	
1941–42	5	2ª Reg. P.	4th	
1942–43	5	2ª Reg.	4th	
1943–44	6	2ª Reg.	3rd	
1944–45	6	2ª Reg. P.	1st	
1945–46	4	1ª Reg. A	1st	
1946–47	3	3ª	5th	
1947–48	3	3ª	7th	Third round
1948–49	3	3ª	14th	Second round
1949–50	3	3ª	16th	
1950–51	3	3ª	11th	
1951–52	3	3ª	16th	
1952–53	3	3ª	17th	
1953–54	4	1ª Reg.	8th	
1954–55	4	1ª Reg.	11th	
1955–56	4	1ª Reg.	3rd	
1956–57	3	3ª	10th	
1957–58	3	3ª	19th	
1958–59	4	1ª Reg.	5th	

Season	Tier	Division	Place	Copa del Rey
1959–60	4	1ª Reg.	8th	
1960–61	4	1ª Reg.	1st	
1961–62	3	3ª	8th	
1962–63	3	3ª	13th	
1963–64	4	1ª Reg.	8th	
1964–65	4	1ª Reg.	4th	
1965–66	4	1ª Reg.	1st	
1966–67	3	3ª	17th	
1967–68	3	3ª	18th	
1968–69	3	3ª	20th	
1969–70	4	Reg. Pref.	15th	
1970–71	5	1ª Reg.	4th	
1971–72	5	1ª Reg.	11th	
1972–73	5	1ª Reg.	4th	
1973–74	5	1ª Reg.	3rd	
1974–75	5	1ª Reg.	3rd	
1975–76	5	1ª Reg.	11th	
1976–77	5	1ª Reg.	5th	
1977–78	5	Reg. Pref.	10th	
1978–79	5	Reg. Pref.	3rd	

Season	Tier	Division	Place	Copa del Rey
1979–80	4	3ª	7th	First round
1980–81	4	3ª	10th	First round
1981–82	4	3ª	6th	
1982–83	4	3ª	16th	First round
1983–84	4	3ª	17th	
1984–85	4	3ª	8th	
1985–86	4	3ª	10th	
1986–87	4	3ª	13th	
1987–88	4	3ª	6th	
1988–89	4	3ª	13th	
1989–90	4	3ª	10th	
1990–91	4	3ª	16th	
1991–92	4	3ª	9th	
1992–93	4	3ª	13th	
1993–94	4	3ª	12th	
1994–95	4	3ª	8th	
1995–96	4	3ª	19th	
1996–97	5	1ª Cat.	3rd	
1997–98	4	3ª	19th	
1998–99	5	1ª Cat.	4th	

Season	Tier	Division	Place	Copa del Rey
1999–2000	5	1ª Cat.	19th	
2000–01	6	Pref. Terr.	13th	
2001–02	6	Pref. Terr.	11th	
2002–03	6	Pref. Terr.	5th	
2003–04	6	Pref. Terr.	9th	
2004–05	6	Pref. Terr.	14th	
2005–06	6	Pref. Terr.	1st	
2006–07	5	1ª Cat.	2nd	
2007–08	4	3ª	18th	
2008–09	5	1ª Cat.	16th	
2009–10	5	1ª Cat.	7th	
2010–11	5	1ª Cat.	12th	
2011–12	5	1ª Cat.	13th	
2012–13	5	1ª Cat.	5th	
2013–14	5	1ª Cat.	6th	
2014–15	5	1ª Cat.	13th	
2015–16	5	1ª Cat.	5th	
2016–17	5	1ª Cat.	7th	
2017–18	5	1ª Cat.	6th	
2018–19	5	1ª Cat.	3rd	

Season	Tier	Division	Place	Copa del Rey
2019–20	4	3ª	18th	
2020–21	4	3ª	10th / 9th	
2021–22	6	1ª Cat.	8th	
2022–23	6	1ª Cat.	11th	
2023–24	7	1ª Cat.	10th	
2024–25	7	1ª Cat.	4th	
2025–26	7	1ª Cat.		

- 34 seasons in Tercera División

== Notable players ==
- (Equatorial Guinea) Rubén Epitié
- (Spain) Carlos
- (Spain) Josep Clotet
- (Spain) Guillem Martí
- (Spain) Jordi Tarrés
