= CF Peralada =

Spanish football team

Coordinates: 42.311132°N 3.013392°E

Peralada
- Full name: Club de Fútbol Peralada
- Founded: 1915; 111 years ago
- Ground: Municipal, Peralada, Catalonia, Spain
- Capacity: 1,500
- President: Josep Isern
- Head coach: Javi García (caretaker)
- League: Tercera Federación – Group 5
- 2025–26: Tercera Federación – Group 5, 8th of 18
- Website: www.cfperalada.com
Home colours	Away colours

Club de Futbol Peralada is a Catalan Spanish football team based in Peralada, in Province of Girona of the autonomous community of Catalonia. Founded in 1915, it plays in Tercera Federación – Group 5, holding home matches at Municipal de Peralada with a capacity of 1,500 seats.

The club has acted as a reserve team of Girona FC from 2016 to 2019, with the name of CF Peralada-Girona B.

== History ==
Peralada was founded in 1915 as a local community team, assembled simply to play friendly matches against other village teams in the area. The club eventually took the name Club Deportiu Peralada (Sports Club Peralada) in 1936, under the leadership of their first president, Martí Roca. At the time, their shirt was blue and they played games in a field owned by one Miquel Pujol, a site which has now been partially converted into a cafe.

During the upheaval of the Spanish Civil War the club took the decision to cease operations, only resuming sporting activities in 1950. The following year, the team moved to the Camp de Cal Músic, on land rented from the municipal government.

In 1981, the city council purchased the land which was to become their present stadium. Lack of funds prevented the site from being fully completed until 1992, however, when the Suqué-Mateu family - owners of Peralada Castle - turned the club's financial situation around with a generous sponsorship. The increased budget available and improved facilities were rewarded over the following several seasons, as CF Peralada steadily climbed to a level in the Catalan regional league system higher than it had ever previously reached in its history. By 2002/03, the club for the first time ascended from the Catalan regional divisions to enter the Tercera División, the lowest of the fully nation-wide leagues in Spain. Two seasons after this promotion, the club reached the semi-finals of the Copa Catalunya for the first time, where they were knocked out by no less than FC Barcelona.

Peralada's drive up the league pyramid ended as they levelled off their ascent by spending five seasons in the Tercera División before they were relegated back to the first tier of Catalan regional football in 2007. It would take a further seven seasons before the club was able to return to the Tercera, which they did in 2014.

=== Association with Girona FC ===
Paralleling Peralada's rise through the leagues a decade earlier, nearby side Girona FC had themselves risen from the Tercera División (the fourth tier of Spanish football) from the middle of the first decade of the new century to reach the Segunda División (the second tier), unsuccessfully contesting the play-offs for promotion to the summit of the league system, La Liga, three times in four seasons by 2016. Having set their sights on football at the highest level, it had become clear to Girona's management that the gap in footballing standards between their first team and their reserve team - a former village side only purchased in 2012 and sat three tiers below Girona FC itself - was too large for practical development of young players by transfer between the two teams. As a result, they began a search for a nearby team playing at a level in between the two, to act as an intermediary reserve side. Quickly identifying Peralada as a candidate for an affiliation relationship, the two clubs came to an understanding whereby they would affiliate for a fixed term of five years starting from 2016.

In 2017, Peralada played for the first time the play-offs to Segunda División B, but was eliminated in the last round by Rápido de Bouzas. However, on 7 July 2017, the club confirmed that it would promote to Segunda División B by paying the €133,000 the Royal Spanish Football Federation established for paying the debts of CF Gavà and CD Boiro players.

On 23 July 2017, the club's members voted in favour of renaming the club to CF Peralada-Girona B in recognition of the extension of the club's affiliation with Girona FC after their promotion to Segunda División B. The vinculation of Peralada with Girona finished in 2019, after the relegation of both clubs, of Peralada to Tercera and Girona to Segunda. In that 2018–19 season CF Peralada won just 8 of 28 games and finished 19th in the Segunda División B, Group 3.

== Season to season ==
Season	Tier	Division	Place	Copa del Rey
1968–69	6	2ª Reg.		
1969–70	6	2ª Reg.	14th	
1970–71	6	2ª Reg.	13th	
1971–72	6	2ª Reg.	12th	
1972–73	6	2ª Reg.	7th	
1973–74	6	2ª Reg.	16th	
1974–75	6	2ª Reg.	14th	
1975–76	6	2ª Reg.	14th	
1976–77	6	2ª Reg.	15th	
1977–78	7	2ª Reg.	15th	
1978–79	7	2ª Reg.	16th	
1979–80	7	2ª Reg.	18th	
1980–81	8	3ª Reg.	8th	
1981–82	8	3ª Reg.	7th	
1982–83	7	2ª Reg.	11th	
1983–84	7	2ª Reg.	6th	
1984–85	6	1ª Reg.	10th	
1985–86	6	1ª Reg.	18th	
1986–87	7	2ª Reg.	15th	
1987–88	7	2ª Reg.	10th	

Season	Tier	Division	Place	Copa del Rey
1988–89	7	2ª Reg.	15th	
1989–90	7	2ª Reg.	12th	
1990–91	7	2ª Reg.	7th	
1991–92	8	2ª Terr.	16th	
1992–93	8	2ª Terr.	11th	
1993–94	8	2ª Terr.	3rd	
1994–95	8	2ª Terr.	1st	
1995–96	7	1ª Terr.	10th	
1996–97	7	1ª Terr.	1st	
1997–98	6	Pref. Terr.	2nd	
1998–99	5	1ª Cat.	11th	
1999–2000	5	1ª Cat.	7th	
2000–01	5	1ª Cat.	9th	
2001–02	5	1ª Cat.	3rd	
2002–03	4	3ª	12th	
2003–04	4	3ª	17th	
2004–05	4	3ª	5th	
2005–06	4	3ª	8th	
2006–07	4	3ª	19th	
2007–08	5	1ª Cat.	13th	

Season	Tier	Division	Place	Copa del Rey
2008–09	5	1ª Cat.	14th	
2009–10	5	1ª Cat.	14th	
2010–11	5	1ª Cat.	5th	
2011–12	5	1ª Cat.	14th	
2012–13	5	1ª Cat.	6th	
2013–14	5	1ª Cat.	1st	
2014–15	4	3ª	12th	
2015–16	4	3ª	14th	
2016–17	4	3ª	2nd	N/A (Note: Reserve team of Girona.)
2017–18	3	2ª B	9th	N/A
2018–19	3	2ª B	19th	N/A
2019–20	4	3ª	5th	
2020–21	4	3ª	7th / 2nd	
2021–22	5	3ª RFEF	10th	
2022–23	5	3ª Fed.	5th	
2023–24	5	3ª Fed.	14th	
2024–25	5	3ª Fed.	4th	
2025–26	5	3ª Fed.	8th	
2026–27	5	3ª Fed.		

- 2 seasons in Segunda División B
- 10 seasons in Tercera División
- 6 seasons in Tercera Federación/Tercera División RFEF

== Current squad ==
As of 17 October 2019

Note: Flags indicate national team as defined under FIFA eligibility rules; some limited exceptions apply. Players may hold more than one non-FIFA nationality.

No.	Pos.	Nation	Player
1	GK	ESP	David Aroca
2	DF	ESP	Carles Puig
3	DF	ESP	Albert Canal
4	DF	ESP	Sergio Moreno
5	DF	ESP	Antoni Cunill
6	MF	ESP	Iván Amoedo
7	MF	ESP	Pime
8	MF	ESP	Eric Vilanova
9	FW	ESP	Bertomeu
10	FW	ESP	Xavi Ferrón
11	MF	ESP	Ritxi

No.	Pos.	Nation	Player
13	GK	ESP	Gerard Asparó
14	FW	ESP	Arnau
15	MF	ARG	Jorge Torres
16	DF	ESP	Sergi Bas
17	DF	ESP	Guillem
18	MF	ESP	Pep Piany
19	FW	ESP	Marc Medina
20	FW	GAM	Dembo Batchilly
—	DF	ESP	Josu
—	GK	ESP	Ian Dore
—	MF	ESP	Biel Font
—	MF	ESP	Aleix Caball

== Former players ==
- (Equatorial Guinea) (Spain) Alberto Edjogo
- (Equatorial Guinea) (Spain) Rubén Epitié
