= UE Rapitenca =

Association football club in Spain

Rapitenca
- Full name: Unió Esportiva Rapitenca
- Founded: 1930; 96 years ago
- Stadium: Estadi Municipal La Devesa
- Capacity: 3,000
- President: Josep Maria Miralles
- Head coach: Xavi Sánchez
- League: Primera Catalana – Group 3
- 2025–26: Primera Catalana – Group 3, 8th of 16
Home colours	Away colours

Unió Esportiva Rapitenca is a Spanish football team based in Sant Carles de la Ràpita, in the autonomous community of Catalonia. Founded in 1930 it currently plays in Primera Catalana – Group 3, holding home matches at Estadi Municipal La Devesa, which holds 3,000 spectators.

== History ==
The club was officially founded on November 6, 1930. However the news about the foundation of UE Rapitenca appeared in the magazine "Crítica" one week earlier on October 30.

== Season to season ==
Season	Tier	Division	Place	Copa del Rey
1940–41	6	2ª Reg.	1st	
1941–42	6	2ª Reg.	1st	
1942–43	5	2ª Reg.	2nd	
1943–44	5	2ª Reg.	3rd	
1944–45	6	2ª Reg. P.	3rd	
1945–46	5	1ª Reg. B	1st	
1946–47	5	1ª Reg. B	9th	
1947–48	5	1ª Reg. B	2nd	
1948–49	5	1ª Reg. B	11th	
1949–50	5	1ª Reg. B	8th	
1950–51	5	1ª Reg. B	2nd	
1951–52	5	1ª Reg. B	6th	
1952–53	5	1ª Reg. B	5th	
1953–54	5	2ª Reg.	1st	
1954–55	4	1ª Reg.	8th	
1955–56	4	1ª Reg.	4th	
1956–57	3	3ª	15th	
1957–58	3	3ª	3rd	
1958–59	3	3ª	3rd	
1959–60	3	3ª	8th	

Season	Tier	Division	Place	Copa del Rey
1960–61	3	3ª	7th	
1961–62	3	3ª	15th	
1962–63	4	1ª Reg.	12th	
1963–64	5	2ª Reg.	7th	
1964–65	5	2ª Reg.	2nd	
1965–66	4	1ª Reg.	7th	
1966–67	4	1ª Reg.	20th	
1967–68	5	2ª Reg.	1st	
1968–69	5	1ª Reg.	11th	
1969–70	5	1ª Reg.	16th	
1970–71	6	2ª Reg.	2nd	
1971–72	6	2ª Reg.	1st	
1972–73	5	1ª Reg.	11th	
1973–74	5	1ª Reg.	17th	
1974–75	6	2ª Reg.	1st	
1975–76	5	1ª Reg.	9th	
1976–77	5	1ª Reg.	14th	
1977–78	6	1ª Reg.	4th	
1978–79	6	1ª Reg.	4th	
1979–80	6	1ª Reg.	7th	

Season	Tier	Division	Place	Copa del Rey
1980–81	6	1ª Reg.	14th	
1981–82	6	1ª Reg.	4th	
1982–83	6	1ª Reg.	12th	
1983–84	6	1ª Reg.	18th	
1984–85	7	2ª Reg.	5th	
1985–86	7	2ª Reg.	1st	
1986–87	6	1ª Reg.	9th	
1987–88	6	1ª Reg.	8th	
1988–89	6	1ª Reg.	2nd	
1989–90	6	1ª Reg.	8th	
1990–91	6	1ª Reg.	9th	
1991–92	7	1ª Terr.	4th	
1992–93	7	1ª Terr.	9th	
1993–94	7	1ª Terr.	9th	
1994–95	7	1ª Terr.	14th	
1995–96	7	1ª Terr.	12th	
1996–97	7	1ª Terr.	5th	
1997–98	7	1ª Terr.	5th	
1998–99	7	1ª Terr.	11th	
1999–2000	7	1ª Terr.	12th	

Season	Tier	Division	Place	Copa del Rey
2000–01	7	1ª Terr.	1st	
2001–02	6	Pref. Terr.	9th	
2002–03	6	Pref. Terr.	8th	
2003–04	6	Pref. Terr.	1st	
2004–05	5	1ª Cat.	4th	
2005–06	4	3ª	7th	
2006–07	4	3ª	11th	
2007–08	4	3ª	5th	
2008–09	4	3ª	14th	
2009–10	4	3ª	18th	
2010–11	5	1ª Cat.	8th	
2011–12	5	1ª Cat.	1st	
2012–13	4	3ª	8th	
2013–14	4	3ª	19th	
2014–15	5	1ª Cat.	4th	
2015–16	5	1ª Cat.	12th	
2016–17	5	1ª Cat.	10th	
2017–18	5	1ª Cat.	11th	
2018–19	5	1ª Cat.	17th	
2019–20	6	2ª Cat.	2nd	

Season	Tier	Division	Place	Copa del Rey
2020–21	5	1ª Cat.	3rd	
2021–22	6	1ª Cat.	2nd	
2022–23	5	3ª Fed.	12th	
2023–24	5	3ª Fed.	18th	
2024–25	6	Lliga Elit	13th	
2025–26	7	1ª Cat.		

- 13 seasons in Tercera División
- 2 seasons in Tercera Federación

== Famous players ==
- (Ghana) Baba Sule
