= 1969–70 Tercera División =

Tercera División
- Season: 1969–70

The 1969–70 Tercera División season was the 36th edition since its establishment.

== Group 1 ==
Pos	Team	Pld	W	D	L	GF	GA	GD	Pts	Promotion or relegation
1	Langreo	38	24	11	3	70	21	+49	59	Promotion play-offs
2	Lugo	38	22	7	9	62	26	+36	51	
3	Ensidesa	38	18	10	10	69	44	+25	46	
4	Caudal	38	15	15	8	40	35	+5	45	
5	San Martín	38	18	9	11	56	39	+17	45	
6	Avilés	38	17	10	11	56	36	+20	44	
7	Vetusta	38	15	13	10	48	36	+12	43	
8	Candás	38	17	9	12	66	61	+5	43	
9	Turón	38	16	10	12	44	37	+7	42	Relegation to the Regional
10	Compostela	38	14	13	11	63	39	+24	41	Relegation to the Regional
11	Fabril	38	12	15	11	56	45	+11	39	Relegation to the Regional
12	Gijón Industrial	38	12	13	13	38	44	−6	37	Relegation to the Regional
13	Gran Peña	38	12	9	17	42	56	−14	33	Relegation to the Regional
14	Turista	38	13	7	18	44	62	−18	33	Relegation to the Regional
15	At. Pontevedrés	38	11	8	19	44	63	−19	30	Relegation to the Regional
16	At. Orense	38	11	7	20	31	57	−26	29	Relegation to the Regional
17	Entrego	38	11	5	22	36	75	−39	27	Relegation to the Regional
18	Alondras	38	7	11	20	43	71	−28	25	Relegation to the Regional
19	Praviano	38	8	8	22	31	59	−28	24	Relegation to the Regional
20	At. Gijón	38	8	8	22	38	71	−33	24	Relegation to the Regional

== Group 2 ==
Pos	Team	Pld	W	D	L	GF	GA	GD	Pts	Promotion or relegation
1	Racing de Santander	38	27	9	2	103	26	+77	63	Promotion play-offs
2	Cultural Leonesa	38	26	6	6	82	36	+46	58	
3	Sestao	38	25	6	7	93	35	+58	56	
4	Gim. Torrelavega	38	22	9	7	75	34	+41	53	
5	Baracaldo	38	19	9	10	62	41	+21	47	
6	Ponferradina	38	19	7	12	57	48	+9	45	
7	Palencia	38	19	6	13	64	51	+13	44	
8	Basconia	38	18	7	13	65	44	+21	43	
9	Dep. Alavés	38	18	7	13	71	39	+32	43	Relegation to the Regional
10	Indauchu	38	13	12	13	55	48	+7	38	Relegation to the Regional
11	Cacabelense	38	15	7	16	53	65	−12	37	Relegation to the Regional
12	Guecho	38	15	7	16	54	47	+7	37	Relegation to the Regional
13	Villosa	38	11	9	18	54	75	−21	31	Relegation to the Regional
14	Erandio	38	9	10	19	45	68	−23	28	Relegation to the Regional
15	Arenas	38	10	8	20	44	68	−24	28	Relegation to the Regional
16	Laredo	38	9	9	20	42	77	−35	27	Relegation to the Regional
17	Rayo Cantabria	38	7	11	20	38	73	−35	25	Relegation to the Regional
18	Júpiter Leonés	38	7	11	20	34	82	−48	25	Relegation to the Regional
19	Hullera	38	3	10	25	38	102	−64	16	Relegation to the Regional
20	Sp. Luchana	38	5	6	27	30	100	−70	16	Relegation to the Regional

== Group 3 ==
Pos	Team	Pld	W	D	L	GF	GA	GD	Pts	Promotion or relegation
1	Logroñés	38	29	4	5	120	27	+93	62	Promotion play-offs
2	Éibar	38	26	6	6	109	34	+75	58	
3	San Sebastián	38	24	6	8	96	27	+69	54	
4	Chantrea	38	23	5	10	66	33	+33	51	
5	Huesca	38	20	9	9	74	40	+34	49	
6	Real Unión	38	23	2	13	64	37	+27	48	
7	Tudelano	38	21	5	12	86	39	+47	47	
8	Calvo Sotelo And.	38	20	7	11	55	47	+8	47	
9	Aragón	38	16	8	14	61	68	−7	40	Relegation to the Regional
10	Iruña	38	14	9	15	70	66	+4	37	Relegation to the Regional
11	Tolosa	38	15	5	18	57	53	+4	35	Relegation to the Regional
12	Numancia	38	15	3	20	60	74	−14	33	Relegation to the Regional
13	Barbastro	38	11	11	16	37	64	−27	33	Relegation to the Regional
14	Calahorra	38	13	6	19	55	70	−15	32	Relegation to the Regional
15	Oberena	38	13	4	21	62	72	−10	30	Relegation to the Regional
16	Monzón	38	10	8	20	43	89	−46	28	Relegation to the Regional
17	Motrico	38	12	3	23	48	74	−26	27	Relegation to the Regional
18	Binéfar	38	7	7	24	42	109	−67	21	Relegation to the Regional
19	Teruel	38	7	6	25	43	96	−53	20	Relegation to the Regional
20	Utebo	38	2	4	32	17	146	−129	8	Relegation to the Regional

== Group 4 ==
Pos	Team	Pld	W	D	L	GF	GA	GD	Pts	Promotion or relegation
1	Terrassa	38	25	6	7	73	32	+41	56	Promotion play-offs
2	Badalona	38	22	10	6	82	36	+46	54	
3	Girona	38	20	11	7	85	36	+49	51	
4	Europa	38	20	10	8	61	31	+30	50	
5	Condal	38	19	10	9	64	33	+31	48	
6	Calella	38	20	7	11	85	53	+32	47	
7	Gim. Tarragona	38	18	10	10	61	44	+17	46	
8	Mataró	38	18	10	10	45	45	0	46	
9	Figueras	38	17	8	13	75	56	+19	42	Relegation to the Regional
10	Lérida	38	17	8	13	53	44	+9	42	Relegation to the Regional
11	Gramanet	38	16	7	15	56	54	+2	39	Relegation to the Regional
12	At. Cataluña	38	16	6	16	57	49	+8	38	Relegation to the Regional
13	Gavá	38	12	8	18	53	76	−23	32	Relegation to the Regional
14	Samboyano	38	12	8	18	39	56	−17	32	Relegation to the Regional
15	Lloret	38	13	5	20	50	66	−16	31	Relegation to the Regional
16	Moncada	38	9	8	21	28	61	−33	26	Relegation to the Regional
17	Villanueva	38	8	9	21	37	82	−45	25	Relegation to the Regional
18	Reus	38	6	8	24	43	96	−53	20	Relegation to the Regional
19	Vilafranca	38	8	4	26	40	82	−42	20	Relegation to the Regional
20	Olot	38	5	5	28	40	95	−55	15	Relegation to the Regional

== Group 5 ==
Pos	Team	Pld	W	D	L	GF	GA	GD	Pts	Promotion or relegation
1	Villarreal	38	23	10	5	83	36	+47	56	Promotion play-offs
2	Mestalla	38	21	10	7	74	30	+44	52	
3	Paiporta	38	22	7	9	62	31	+31	51	
4	Levante	38	20	9	9	79	34	+45	49	
5	Ibiza	38	20	8	10	55	32	+23	48	
6	Tortosa	38	21	6	11	61	39	+22	48	
7	Acero	38	18	10	10	59	38	+21	46	
8	At. Baleares	38	18	9	11	60	41	+19	45	
9	Benicarló	38	15	11	12	51	46	+5	41	Relegation to the Regional
10	Alcira	38	17	7	14	56	44	+12	41	Relegation to the Regional
11	Mahón	38	13	14	11	33	28	+5	40	Relegation to the Regional
12	At. Ciudadela	38	14	11	13	49	69	−20	39	Relegation to the Regional
13	Sueca	38	13	7	18	48	55	−7	33	Relegation to the Regional
14	Oliva	38	12	7	19	52	67	−15	31	Relegation to the Regional
15	Onda	38	11	9	18	43	60	−17	31	Relegation to the Regional
16	Torrente	38	12	6	20	33	57	−24	30	Relegation to the Regional
17	Menorca	38	8	9	21	31	61	−30	25	Relegation to the Regional
18	Palma	38	9	6	23	39	68	−29	24	Relegation to the Regional
19	Manacor	38	8	3	27	36	103	−67	16	Relegation to the Regional
20	Soledad	38	4	3	31	25	90	−65	11	Relegation to the Regional

== Group 6 ==
Pos	Team	Pld	W	D	L	GF	GA	GD	Pts	Promotion or relegation
1	Hércules	38	22	13	3	62	20	+42	57	Promotion play-offs
2	Gandía	38	20	11	7	72	37	+35	51	
3	Alcoyano	38	23	4	11	71	39	+32	50	
4	Cartagena	38	22	5	11	68	38	+30	49	
5	Valdepeñas	38	20	7	11	64	38	+26	47	
6	Recr. Granada	38	18	10	10	48	35	+13	46	
7	Imperial Murcia	38	17	12	9	64	30	+34	46	
8	Jaén	38	18	10	10	51	39	+12	46	
9	Eldense	38	16	14	8	53	36	+17	46	Relegation to the Regional
10	Linares	38	13	15	10	33	30	+3	41	Relegation to the Regional
11	Novelda	38	15	8	15	47	46	+1	38	Relegation to the Regional
12	Orihuela	38	15	7	16	54	46	+8	37	Relegation to the Regional
13	Manchego	38	12	13	13	50	43	+7	37	Relegation to the Regional
14	Albacete	38	12	9	17	36	49	−13	33	Relegation to the Regional
15	La Unión	38	11	10	17	42	47	−5	32	Relegation to the Regional
16	At. Calvo Sotelo	38	12	7	19	57	67	−10	31	Relegation to the Regional
17	Benidorm	38	8	13	17	49	65	−16	29	Relegation to the Regional
18	At. Cartagena	38	4	14	20	31	72	−41	22	Relegation to the Regional
19	Iliturgi	38	5	6	27	19	98	−79	16	Relegation to the Regional
20	Adra	38	1	4	33	18	114	−96	6	Relegation to the Regional

== Group 7 ==
Pos	Team	Pld	W	D	L	GF	GA	GD	Pts	Promotion or relegation
1	Cádiz	38	28	9	1	65	11	+54	65	Promotion play-offs
2	Jerez	38	21	11	6	52	25	+27	53	
3	Melilla	38	21	8	9	62	30	+32	50	
4	Recr. Huelva	38	22	5	11	62	32	+30	49	
5	Sevilla At.	38	19	10	9	61	37	+24	48	
6	Triana	38	19	7	12	63	44	+19	45	
7	Portuense	38	19	7	12	58	47	+11	45	
8	Linense	38	18	9	11	59	46	+13	45	
9	Estepona	38	19	6	13	52	46	+6	44	Relegation to the Regional
10	Jerez Ind.	38	13	14	11	55	39	+16	40	Relegation to the Regional
11	Alcalá	38	14	10	14	43	42	+1	38	Relegation to the Regional
12	San Fernando	38	12	13	13	42	51	−9	37	Relegation to the Regional
13	Marbella	38	12	12	14	38	35	+3	36	Relegation to the Regional
14	Algeciras	38	12	12	14	48	55	−7	36	Relegation to the Regional
15	At. Ceuta	38	13	7	18	40	47	−7	33	Relegation to the Regional
16	Sanluqueño	38	10	10	18	36	61	−25	30	Relegation to the Regional
17	Ayamonte	38	7	6	25	33	69	−36	20	Relegation to the Regional
18	Puerto Malagueño	38	5	8	25	32	88	−56	18	Relegation to the Regional
19	África Ceutí	38	6	3	29	29	70	−41	15	Relegation to the Regional
20	Rota	38	3	7	28	21	76	−55	13	Relegation to the Regional

== Group 8 ==
Pos	Team	Pld	W	D	L	GF	GA	GD	Pts	Qualification or relegation
1	Moscardó	38	24	6	8	73	33	+40	54	Promotion play-offs
2	Tenerife	38	20	11	7	62	26	+36	51	
3	Plus Ultra	38	20	9	9	57	28	+29	49	
4	Badajoz	38	21	7	10	80	48	+32	49	
5	Reyfra At.	38	17	12	9	75	47	+28	46	
6	Talavera	38	20	6	12	71	57	+14	46	
7	Mérida Ind.	38	18	9	11	72	48	+24	45	
8	Carabanchel	38	19	7	12	68	50	+18	45	
9	Europa Delicias	38	17	9	12	64	51	+13	43	Relegation to the Regional
10	Plasencia	38	15	11	12	57	47	+10	41	Relegation to the Regional
11	Pegaso	38	15	10	13	61	55	+6	40	Relegation to the Regional
12	Boetticher	38	15	9	14	64	64	0	39	Relegation to the Regional
13	Aviaco	38	13	11	14	49	54	−5	37	Relegation to the Regional
14	Alcalá	38	14	8	16	65	60	+5	36	Relegation to the Regional
15	Extremadura	38	12	8	18	53	65	−12	32	Relegation to the Regional
16	Cacereño	38	11	7	20	55	71	−16	29	Relegation to the Regional
17	Quintanar	38	6	14	18	41	77	−36	26	Relegation to the Regional
18	Gim. Segoviana	38	10	5	23	48	71	−23	25	Relegation to the Regional
19	Toledo	38	8	4	26	49	100	−51	20	Relegation to the Regional
20	Olivenza	38	2	3	33	27	139	−112	7	Relegation to the Regional

== Playoffs ==
=== Promotion to Segunda División ===
Team 1	Agg.	Team 2	1st leg	2nd leg
Langreo	2-1	Villarreal	1-0	1-1
Hércules	3-3	Logroñés	1-1	2-2
Cádiz	1-0	Racing de Santander	0-0	1-0
Moscardó	1-1	Tarrasa	1-0	0-1

- Match of Tiebreaker:

Team 1	Score	Team 2
Hércules	1 - 3	Logroñés
Moscardó	4 - 1	Tarrasa

- Promotion to Segunda: Langreo, Logroñés, Cádiz and Moscardó
- Qualified to promotion/relegation playoff: Villarreal, Hércules, Santander and Tarrasa

=== Promotion/relegation ===
Team 1	Agg.	Team 2	1st leg	2nd leg
Tarrasa	2-3	Burgos	2-0	0-3
Hércules	4-1	Osasuna	4-0	0-1
Bilbao At.	3-3	Villarreal	2-1	1-2
Ilicitano	2-2	Racing de Santander	2-2	0-0

- Match of Tiebreaker:

Team 1	Score	Team 2
Bilbao At.	1 - 2	Villarreal
Ilicitano	0 - 1	Racing de Santander

- Permanence in Segunda: Burgos
- Promotion to Segunda: Hércules, Villarreal and Santander
- Relegation to Tercera: Osasuna, Bilbao At. and Ilicitano
