= CD Blanes =

Spanish football club

- Full name: Club Deportiu Blanes
- Nickname: Blanc-i-blaus
- Founded: 1913
- Ground: Estadi Municipal, Blanes, Catalonia, Spain
- Capacity: 3,000
- Chairman: Isaías Salinas
- Manager: Xavier Tapie
- League: Segona Catalana – Group 1
- 2024–25: Segona Catalana – Group 1, 7th of 16
- Website: https://www.cdblanesoficial.com/
Home colours	Away colours

Club Deportiu Blanes is a football team based in Blanes, Catalonia, Spain. Founded in 1913, it plays in Segona Catalana – Group 1. Its stadium is Estadi Municipal de Blanes.

== History ==
Founded in 1913 by supporters of FC Barcelona and RCD Espanyol, Blanes were founded initially with the same colours of the latter. The club entered the Catalan Football Federation in 1934, and played regional football until 1985, when they achieved a first-ever promotion to Tercera División.

Blanes won the first edition of the Copa Generalitat in 1990, defeating UDA Gramenet in the final. In 1994, however, the club suffered relegation, and fell two further divisions in the following three seasons.

In 2006, Blanes returned to the fourth division after achieving a third consecutive promotion, all three as champions. Relegated in 2010, the club subsequently played mainly in Segona Catalana.

== Season to season ==
Season	Tier	Division	Place	Copa del Rey
1939–40	7	3ª Reg.	4th	
1940–41	6	2ª Reg. P.	3rd	
1941–42	5	2ª Reg. P.	3rd	
1946–47	6	3ª Reg.	1st	
1942–1946	DNP			
1947–48	5	1ª Reg. B	3rd	
1948–49	5	1ª Reg. B	3rd	
1949–50	5	1ª Reg. B	4th	
1950–51	5	1ª Reg. B	9th	
1951–52	5	1ª Reg. B	4th	
1952–53	5	1ª Reg. B	6th	
1953–54	5	2ª Reg.	3rd	
1954–55	4	1ª Reg.	3rd	
1955–56	4	1ª Reg.	9th	
1956–57	4	1ª Reg.	(R)	
1957–58	DNP			
1958–59	5	2ª Reg.	3rd	
1959–60	5	2ª Reg.	1st	
1960–61	4	1ª Reg.	12th	
1961–62	4	1ª Reg.	11th	

Season	Tier	Division	Place	Copa del Rey
1962–63	4	1ª Reg.	9th	
1963–64	4	1ª Reg.	12th	
1964–65	4	1ª Reg.	16th	
1965–66	4	1ª Reg.	11th	
1966–67	4	1ª Reg.	19th	
1967–68	5	2ª Reg.	2nd	
1968–69	5	1ª Reg.	8th	
1969–70	5	1ª Reg.	2nd	
1970–71	5	1ª Reg.	1st	
1971–72	4	Reg. Pref.	14th	
1972–73	4	Reg. Pref.	18th	
1973–74	5	1ª Reg.	2nd	
1974–75	5	1ª Reg.	4th	
1975–76	5	1ª Reg.	3rd	
1976–77	5	1ª Reg.	10th	
1977–78	6	1ª Reg.	10th	
1978–79	6	1ª Reg.	13th	
1979–80	6	1ª Reg.	11th	
1980–81	6	1ª Reg.	14th	
1981–82	6	1ª Reg.	3rd	

Season	Tier	Division	Place	Copa del Rey
1982–83	6	1ª Reg.	2nd	
1983–84	5	Reg. Pref.	6th	
1984–85	5	Reg. Pref.	1st	
1985–86	4	3ª	12th	
1986–87	4	3ª	12th	
1987–88	4	3ª	7th	
1988–89	4	3ª	4th	
1989–90	4	3ª	7th	
1990–91	4	3ª	7th	Second round
1991–92	4	3ª	6th	
1992–93	4	3ª	18th	Second round
1993–94	4	3ª	20th	
1994–95	5	1ª Cat.	16th	
1995–96	5	1ª Cat.	20th	
1996–97	6	Pref. Terr.	16th	
1997–98	7	1ª Terr.	2nd	
1998–99	7	1ª Terr.	3rd	
1999–2000	7	1ª Terr.	3rd	
2000–01	7	1ª Terr.	2nd	
2001–02	7	1ª Terr.	4th	

Season	Tier	Division	Place	Copa del Rey
2002–03	7	1ª Terr.	2nd	
2003–04	7	1ª Terr.	1st	
2004–05	6	Pref. Terr.	1st	
2005–06	5	1ª Cat.	1st	
2006–07	4	3ª	15th	
2007–08	4	3ª	15th	
2008–09	4	3ª	15th	
2009–10	4	3ª	19th	
2010–11	5	1ª Cat.	19th	
2011–12	6	2ª Cat.	10th	
2012–13	6	2ª Cat.	15th	
2013–14	7	3ª Cat.	13th	
2014–15	7	3ª Cat.	2nd	
2015–16	6	2ª Cat.	12th	
2016–17	6	2ª Cat.	15th	
2017–18	7	3ª Cat.	8th	
2018–19	7	3ª Cat.	1st	
2019–20	6	2ª Cat.	15th	
2020–21	6	2ª Cat.	5th	
2021–22	7	2ª Cat.	2nd	

Season	Tier	Division	Place	Copa del Rey
2022–23	7	2ª Cat.	3rd	
2023–24	7	1ª Cat.	13th	
2024–25	8	2ª Cat.	7th	
2025–26	8	2ª Cat.		

- 13 seasons in Tercera División
- 2 seasons in Primera Catalana
- 7 seasons in Segona Catalana
- 4 seasons in Tercera Catalana
