= UE Olot =

Spanish association football club

Coordinates: 42.190327°N 2.475919°E

Olot
- Full name: Unió Esportiva Olot S.A.D
- Founded: 1921; 105 years ago
- Ground: Municipal, Olot, Catalonia, Spain
- Capacity: 3,000
- President: Joan Agustí
- Head coach: Manix Mandiola
- League: Segunda Federación – Group 2
- 2025–26: Segunda Federación – Group 3, 12th of 18
- Website: http://www.ueolot.com
Home colours	Away colours

Unió Esportiva Olot, S.A.D. is a Spanish football team based in Olot, in the autonomous community of Catalonia. Founded in 1921, it plays in Segunda Federación – Group 2, holding home games at Estadi Municipal d'Olot, with a capacity of 3,000 seats.

== History ==
The history of football in the city of Olot dated back to 1902, when the first games were played. There were two clubs in the beginning of the century, Olot Deportivo and Sport Club Olotí. Both were founded in 1912, and disappeared four years later. UE Olot was founded in 1921, but it was registered in the Catalan Football Federation only on May 14, 1922, under the name of Olot Foot-ball Club. Antoni Mota became its first president and the club's home ground was Camp de l'Estació.

Since 2016, the club implemented a strict policy of only signing players from the Catalan Countries

== Season to season ==
Season	Tier	Division	Place	Copa del Rey
1929–1939	—	Regional	—	
1939–40	7	2ª Reg.	1st	
1940–41	6	2ª Reg.	4th	
1941–42	5	2ª Reg.	1st	
1942–43	4	1ª Reg. B	9th	
1943–44	5	1ª Reg. B	4th	
1944–45	5	1ª Reg. B	2nd	
1945–46	4	1ª Reg. A	3rd	
1946–47	4	1ª Reg.	6th	
1947–48	4	1ª Reg.	13th	
1948–49	4	1ª Reg.	20th	
1949–50	4	1ª Reg. A	16th	
1950–51	4	1ª Reg. A	16th	
1951–52	5	1ª Reg. B	15th	
1952–53	5	1ª Reg. B	5th	
1953–54	5	2ª Reg.	4th	
1954–55	5	2ª Reg.	6th	
1955–56	5	2ª Reg.	1st	
1956–57	3	3ª	1st	
1957–58	3	3ª	7th	

Season	Tier	Division	Place	Copa del Rey
1958–59	3	3ª	3rd	
1959–60	3	3ª	7th	
1960–61	3	3ª	11th	
1961–62	3	3ª	15th	
1962–63	4	1ª Reg.	1st	
1963–64	4	1ª Reg.	1st	
1964–65	3	3ª	18th	
1965–66	3	3ª	3rd	
1966–67	3	3ª	1st	
1967–68	3	3ª	7th	
1968–69	3	3ª	8th	
1969–70	3	3ª	20th	First round
1970–71	4	Reg. Pref.	17th	
1971–72	5	1ª Reg.	3rd	
1972–73	5	1ª Reg.	1st	
1973–74	4	Reg. Pref.	8th	
1974–75	4	Reg. Pref.	12th	
1975–76	4	Reg. Pref.	14th	
1976–77	5	1ª Reg.	2nd	
1977–78	5	Reg. Pref.	1st	

Season	Tier	Division	Place	Copa del Rey
1978–79	4	3ª	7th	Second round
1979–80	4	3ª	14th	Third round
1980–81	4	3ª	11th	
1981–82	4	3ª	8th	
1982–83	4	3ª	1st	
1983–84	4	3ª	12th	Third round
1984–85	4	3ª	20th	
1985–86	5	Reg. Pref.	11th	
1986–87	5	Reg. Pref.	4th	
1987–88	4	3ª	3rd	
1988–89	4	3ª	5th	
1989–90	4	3ª	13th	
1990–91	4	3ª	15th	
1991–92	4	3ª	19th	
1992–93	5	1ª Cat.	2nd	
1993–94	4	3ª	19th	
1994–95	5	1ª Cat.	9th	
1995–96	5	1ª Cat.	16th	
1996–97	5	1ª Cat.	14th	
1997–98	5	1ª Cat.	6th	

Season	Tier	Division	Place	Copa del Rey
1998–99	5	1ª Cat.	19th	
1999–00	6	Pref. Terr.	15th	
2000–01	7	1ª Terr.	8th	
2001–02	7	1ª Terr.	2nd	
2002–03	6	Pref. Terr.	13th	
2003–04	6	Pref. Terr.	9th	
2004–05	6	Pref. Terr.	16th	
2005–06	7	1ª Terr.	6th	
2006–07	7	1ª Terr.	3rd	
2007–08	7	1ª Terr.	3rd	
2008–09	7	1ª Terr.	1st	
2009–10	6	Pref. Terr.	2nd	
2010–11	5	1ª Cat.	1st	
2011–12	4	3ª	8th	
2012–13	4	3ª	1st	
2013–14	3	2ª B	14th	Second round
2014–15	3	2ª B	13th	
2015–16	3	2ª B	18th	
2016–17	4	3ª	1st	
2017–18	3	2ª B	15th	Third round

Season	Tier	Division	Place	Copa del Rey
2018–19	3	2ª B	10th	
2019–20	3	2ª B	7th	First round
2020–21	3	2ª B	11th / 4th	Second round
2021–22	5	3ª RFEF	2nd	
2022–23	4	2ª Fed.	15th	
2023–24	5	3ª Fed.	1st	
2024–25	4	2ª Fed.	11th	Second round
2025–26	4	2ª Fed.	12th	
2026–27	4	2ª Fed.		

- 7 seasons in Segunda División B
- 4 seasons in Segunda Federación
- 28 seasons in Tercera División
- 2 seasons in Tercera Federación/Tercera División RFEF

== Players ==
=== Current squad ===
As of 9 February 2026

Note: Flags indicate national team as defined under FIFA eligibility rules; some limited exceptions apply. Players may hold more than one non-FIFA nationality.

No.	Pos.	Nation	Player
1	GK	ESP	Pol Ballesté
3	DF	ESP	Sergi Marcillo
4	DF	ESP	Robert Costa
5	DF	ESP	Marc Fuentes
6	DF	ESP	Oriol Ayala
7	FW	ESP	Andreu Guiu
8	MF	ESP	Martí Soler
9	FW	ESP	Marc Mas
10	FW	ESP	Rubén Enri
11	MF	ESP	Pedro del Campo
13	GK	ESP	Jan Danés

No.	Pos.	Nation	Player
14	FW	ESP	Marti Puigbert
15	FW	ESP	Albert López
16	MF	ESP	Pau López
17	DF	ESP	Joel Arumí
19	FW	ESP	Pau Salvans
20	FW	ESP	Carlos Martínez
21	MF	ESP	Oriol Marty
22	FW	GAM	Nuha Marong
23	DF	ESP	Guillem Barrés
24	DF	ESP	Víctor Maffeo
28	MF	ESP	Guillem Farrés
