= 1968–69 Tercera División =

Tercera División
- Season: 1968–69

The season 1968–69 of the Tercera División (3rd Level) of the Spanish football started in August 1968 and ended on May–June 1969 the regular phase.

== League table ==
=== Group I ===
Pos	Team	Pld	W	D	L	GF	GA	GD	Pts	Promotion or relegation
1	CD Orense	38	27	9	2	86	14	+72	63	Play-off for promotion
2	UP Langreo	38	26	5	7	89	33	+56	57	
3	SD Compostela	38	26	4	8	90	27	+63	56	
4	CD Ensidesa	38	22	8	8	91	36	+55	52	
5	CD Lugo	38	18	7	13	61	41	+20	43	
6	Atlético Pontevedrés	38	16	8	14	38	34	+4	40	
7	San Martín	38	13	11	14	39	50	−11	37	
8	Candás CF	38	12	12	14	39	43	−4	36	
9	Fabril Deportivo	38	15	6	17	38	45	−7	36	
10	Club Gran Peña	38	14	7	17	41	55	−14	35	
11	CD El Entrego	38	13	7	18	56	78	−22	33	
12	CD Turón	38	14	5	19	46	80	−34	33	
13	SD Vetusta	38	12	8	18	40	47	−7	32	
14	Atlético Gijón	38	11	10	17	36	66	−30	32	
15	Alondras CF	38	13	6	19	42	65	−23	32	
16	CD Praviano	38	10	11	17	46	65	−19	31	
17	Caudal Deportivo	38	8	13	17	34	44	−10	29	
18	Atlético Orense	38	10	8	20	30	59	−29	28	
19	Club Lemos	38	10	8	20	36	60	−24	28	Direct relegation
20	Arosa SC	38	9	9	20	23	59	−36	27	Direct relegation

=== Group II ===
Pos	Team	Pld	W	D	L	GF	GA	GD	Pts	Promotion or relegation
1	Bilbao Athletic	38	29	6	3	89	26	+63	64	Play-off for promotion
2	Real Santander	38	27	8	3	85	17	+68	62	
3	Real Avilés CF	38	27	6	5	94	25	+69	60	
4	Cultural Leonesa	38	23	6	9	84	44	+40	52	
5	SD Ponferradina	38	20	11	7	66	42	+24	51	
6	Sestao Sport Club	38	20	9	9	91	48	+43	49	
7	Barakaldo AH	38	19	9	10	50	32	+18	47	
8	Gimnástica Torrelavega	38	19	5	14	63	42	+21	43	
9	CD Villosa	38	17	8	13	48	43	+5	42	
10	R. Europa Delicias	38	14	10	14	48	48	0	38	
11	Club Erandio	38	13	11	14	49	50	−1	37	
12	CD Basconia	38	15	5	18	67	72	−5	35	
13	CD Guecho	38	14	7	17	64	52	+12	35	
14	SD Rayo Cantabria	38	13	8	17	50	51	−1	34	
15	Arenas Club	38	12	7	19	59	63	−4	31	
16	Hullera Vasco-Leonesa	38	9	3	26	40	98	−58	21	
17	CF Júpiter Leonés	38	6	6	26	34	91	−57	18	
18	UD Cacabelense	38	6	6	26	25	99	−74	18	
19	Atlético Bembibre	38	5	6	27	15	75	−60	16	Direct relegation
20	Hulleras de Sabero	38	1	5	32	24	127	−103	7	Direct relegation

=== Group III ===
Pos	Team	Pld	W	D	L	GF	GA	GD	Pts	Promotion or relegation
1	CA Osasuna	38	28	5	5	103	30	+73	61	Play-off for promotion
2	Real Unión	38	24	5	9	71	34	+37	53	
3	CD Logroñés	38	20	11	7	80	36	+44	51	
4	San Sebastián CF	38	20	7	11	83	47	+36	47	
5	CD Teruel	38	19	9	10	75	59	+16	47	
6	SD Eibar	38	18	9	11	58	38	+20	45	
7	CD Tudelano	38	17	9	12	75	48	+27	43	
8	Aragón CF	38	16	11	11	53	44	+9	43	
9	SD Huesca	38	17	8	13	57	52	+5	42	
10	CD Oberena	38	15	7	16	50	62	−12	37	
11	UD Barbastro	38	15	7	16	51	59	−8	37	
12	Monzón	38	13	10	15	51	60	−9	36	
13	Calvo Sotelo Andorra	38	14	5	19	60	66	−6	33	
14	CD Numancia	38	13	7	18	54	63	−9	33	
15	Motrico CF	38	12	8	18	51	67	−16	32	
16	CD Calahorra	38	12	7	19	48	64	−16	31	
17	CD Binéfar	38	11	9	18	41	80	−39	31	
18	UDC Chantrea	38	11	5	22	46	75	−29	27	
19	SD Ejea	38	7	7	24	38	87	−49	21	Direct relegation
20	Arenas de Zaragoza	38	2	6	30	33	107	−74	10	Direct relegation

=== Group IV ===
Pos	Team	Pld	W	D	L	GF	GA	GD	Pts	Promotion or relegation
1	CD San Andrés	38	22	9	7	64	31	+33	53	Play-off for promotion
2	CD Tarrasa	38	19	11	8	71	48	+23	49	
3	CF Calella	38	19	10	9	64	42	+22	48	
4	CF Badalona	38	18	11	9	67	45	+22	47	
5	UD Lérida	38	19	8	11	57	40	+17	46	
6	CD Europa	38	18	10	10	56	38	+18	46	
7	CD Condal	38	17	11	10	66	38	+28	45	
8	UD Olot	38	19	6	13	59	44	+15	44	
9	CF Villanueva	38	16	8	14	65	57	+8	40	
10	CF Samboyano	38	16	5	17	51	59	−8	37	
11	Gerona CF	38	16	4	18	54	49	+5	36	
12	CF Gavà	38	14	8	16	70	72	−2	36	
13	Atlético Cataluña	38	11	11	16	57	56	+1	33	
14	Lloret CF	38	13	5	20	53	75	−22	31	
15	UDA Gramanet	38	12	6	20	42	53	−11	30	
16	CF Villafranca	38	13	4	21	52	84	−32	30	
17	UD Figueras	38	11	7	20	51	82	−31	29	
18	CD Moncada	38	7	14	17	49	77	−28	28	
19	CF Palafrugell	38	10	9	19	36	67	−31	27	Direct relegation
20	CF Igualada	38	8	7	23	38	65	−27	23	Direct relegation

=== Group V ===
Pos	Team	Pld	W	D	L	GF	GA	GD	Pts	Promotion or relegation
1	CD Castellón	38	25	10	3	84	19	+65	60	Play-off for promotion
2	Gimnàs. Tarragona	38	27	3	8	83	34	+49	57	
3	Levante UD	38	22	8	8	78	34	+44	52	
4	CD Acero	38	22	7	9	71	33	+38	51	
5	CD Atlético Baleares	38	22	7	9	56	27	+29	51	
6	CD Tortosa	38	15	11	12	68	43	+25	41	
7	Torrente CF	38	14	10	14	48	46	+2	38	
8	CD Onda	38	16	5	17	54	50	+4	37	
9	Villarreal CF	38	15	7	16	50	50	0	37	
10	UD Mahón	38	14	8	16	50	55	−5	36	
11	CD Benicarló	38	16	3	19	51	62	−11	35	
12	SD Ibiza	38	14	5	19	44	55	−11	33	
13	CD Manacor	38	13	6	19	39	66	−27	32	
14	Reus Deportivo	38	12	8	18	47	71	−24	32	
15	Atlético Levante	38	12	8	18	46	55	−9	32	
16	CD Menorca	38	12	7	19	36	55	−19	31	
17	CD Constancia	38	11	6	21	49	90	−41	28	
18	CD Soledad	38	11	6	21	34	63	−29	28	
19	UD Poblense	38	10	7	21	39	73	−34	27	Direct relegation
20	UP Santa Catalina	38	9	4	25	40	86	−46	22	Direct relegation

=== Group VI ===
Pos	Team	Pld	W	D	L	GF	GA	GD	Pts	Promotion or relegation
1	Hércules CF	38	22	11	5	80	31	+49	55	Play-off for promotion
2	CD Cartagena	38	24	7	7	72	33	+39	55	
3	Atlético Calvo Sotelo	38	20	6	12	68	47	+21	46	
4	CF Gandía	38	19	6	13	72	49	+23	44	
5	Real Jaén	38	20	4	14	61	39	+22	44	
6	CD Eldense	38	14	14	10	55	47	+8	42	
7	Novelda CF	38	17	7	14	45	49	−4	41	
8	Albacete Balompié	38	16	7	15	52	44	+8	39	
9	Benidorm CF	38	13	12	13	42	50	−8	38	
10	CD Manchego	38	14	10	14	46	56	−10	38	
11	Linares CF	38	15	7	16	54	45	+9	37	
12	CD La Unión	38	15	7	16	45	60	−15	37	
13	Imperial CF	38	16	4	18	58	55	+3	36	
14	CF Valdepeñas	38	14	6	18	46	52	−6	34	
15	Orihuela Deportiva CF	38	12	10	16	50	68	−18	34	
16	CD Iliturgi	38	14	5	19	58	62	−4	33	
17	SD Sueca	38	13	7	18	40	51	−11	33	
18	Paiporta CF	38	13	3	22	55	77	−22	29	
19	Águilas CF	38	9	7	22	44	79	−35	25	Direct relegation
20	Tomelloso CF	38	6	8	24	36	85	−49	20	Direct relegation

=== Group VII ===
Pos	Team	Pld	W	D	L	GF	GA	GD	Pts	Promotion or relegation
1	Recreativo de Huelva	36	24	6	6	66	29	+37	54	Play-off for promotion
2	Melilla CF	36	22	7	7	53	25	+28	51	
3	Triana Balompié	36	21	9	6	67	40	+27	51	
4	Atlético Ceuta	36	16	12	8	54	41	+13	44	
5	Sevilla Atlético	36	14	13	9	60	26	+34	41	
6	Atlético Marbella	36	13	13	10	44	40	+4	39	
7	Xerez CD	36	15	8	13	56	47	+9	38	
8	Balompédica Linense	36	14	10	12	45	43	+2	38	
9	Algeciras CF	36	14	9	13	56	50	+6	37	
10	CD Alcalá	36	15	6	15	43	38	+5	36	
11	CD San Fernando	36	15	5	16	56	54	+2	35	
12	Atlético Malagueño	36	11	12	13	49	45	+4	34	
13	CD Estepona	36	13	7	16	46	58	−12	33	
14	Racing Portuense	36	11	10	15	40	44	−4	32	
15	Atl. Sanluqueño	36	10	7	19	35	53	−18	27	
16	CD Rota	36	10	6	20	33	66	−33	26	
17	Adra CF	36	13	4	19	38	79	−41	24	
18	Ayamonte CF	36	9	6	21	38	61	−23	24	
19	Balón de Cádiz	36	3	8	25	31	71	−40	14	Direct relegation

=== Group VIII ===
Pos	Team	Pld	W	D	L	GF	GA	GD	Pts	Promotion or relegation
1	UD Salamanca	38	23	9	6	72	26	+46	55	Play-off for promotion
2	CD Colonia Moscardó	38	24	7	7	92	42	+50	55	
3	AD Plus Ultra	38	19	11	8	53	34	+19	49	
4	CD Cacereño	38	19	8	11	60	44	+16	46	
5	CD Tenerife	38	20	5	13	79	40	+39	45	
6	CD Badajoz	38	16	12	10	57	40	+17	44	
7	Quintanar de la Orden	38	18	7	13	67	55	+12	43	
8	RSD Alcalá	38	16	9	13	71	58	+13	41	
9	Boetticher y Navarro	38	15	8	15	54	71	−17	38	
10	Mérida Industrial	38	12	13	13	53	55	−2	37	
11	CD Pegaso	38	13	9	16	52	62	−10	35	
12	Talavera CF	38	13	9	16	46	51	−5	35	
13	Reyfra Atlético	38	15	5	18	52	57	−5	35	
14	CD Carabanchel	38	14	7	17	58	48	+10	35	
15	CF Extremadura	38	14	5	19	43	58	−15	33	
16	CD Plasencia	38	12	9	17	41	70	−29	33	
17	Aviaco Madrileño CF	38	8	16	14	57	68	−11	32	
18	Gimnástica Segoviana	38	12	8	18	50	72	−22	32	
19	CD Béjar Industrial	38	7	12	19	41	67	−26	26	Direct relegation
20	Askar CF	38	2	7	29	29	109	−80	11	Direct relegation

== Promotion to Segunda ==
Home Matches:
CD Orense	2-1	Bilbao Athletic
CD San Andrés	1-0	CA Osasuna
CD Castellón	3-2	Hércules CF
Recreativo de Huelva	2-3	UD Salamanca

Away Matches:
Bilbao Athletic	0-1	CD Orense
CA Osasuna	1-0	CD San Andrés
Hércules CF	1-1	CD Castellón
UD Salamanca	0-0	Recreativo
Match of Tiebreaker:
CD San Andrés	0-2	CA Osasuna

- Promoted to Segunda: C.D. Orense, C.At. Osasuna, C.D. Castellón & U.D. Salamanca
- Promotion-Relegation playoff: Bilbao At. Club, C.D. San Andrés, Hércules C.F. & R.C. Recreativo de Huelva

== Promotion-Relegation playoff ==
Home Matches:
Bilbao Athletic	3-0	Alavés
Sant Andreu	2-2	Alcoyano
Ilicitano	3-1	Hércules
Ontinyent	1-0	Recreativo

Away Matches:
Alavés	1-0	Bilbao Athletic	Agg:1-3
Alcoyano	1-2	San Andrés	Agg:3-4
Hércules	1-0	Ilicitano	Agg:2-3
Recreativo	3-2	Onteniente	Agg:3-3
Match of Tiebreaker:
Onteniente	2-1	Recreativo

- Continuing in Segunda: C.D. Ilicitano & Onteniente C.F.
- Promoted to Segunda: Bilbao At. Club & C.D. San Andrés
- Relegated to Tercera: C. Dep. Alavés & C.D. Alcoyano
