= CF Gavà =

Association football club in Spain

Gavà
- Full name: Club de Futbol Gavà
- Founded: 1921; 105 years ago
- Stadium: La Bòbila
- Capacity: 2,550
- President: Iván Carrillo
- Head coach: José Manuel Serrano Castro
- League: Segona Catalana – Group 4
- 2025–26: Segona Catalana – Group 3, 6th of 16
- Website: cfgava.cat
Home colours	Away colours

Club de Futbol Gavà is a Spanish football team based in Gavà, in the autonomous community of Catalonia. Founded in 1922, it plays in Segona Catalana – Group 4, holding home games at Estadi La Bòbila, with a capacity of 2,550 seats.

== History ==
The club was founded on 26 May 1921 on the initiative of local veterinarian Mr. Seculím who brought together the best players from the town.

== Season to season ==
Season	Tier	Division	Place	Copa del Rey
1940–41	6	2ª Reg. P.	3rd	
1941–42	5	2ª Reg. P.	1st	
1942–43	5	2ª Reg.	4th	
1943–44	6	2ª Reg.	2nd	
1944–45	6	2ª Reg. P.	5th	
1945–46	6	2ª Reg. P.	1st	
1946–47	5	2ª Reg.	7th	
1947–48	5	1ª Reg. B	7th	
1948–49	5	1ª Reg. B	1st	
1949–50	5	1ª Reg. B	16th	
1950–51	5	1ª Reg. B	13th	
1951–52	6	2ª Reg.	10th	
1952–53	6	2ª Reg.	5th	
1953–54	5	2ª Reg.	8th	
1954–55	5	2ª Reg.	4th	
1955–56	5	2ª Reg.	1st	
1956–57	3	3ª	19th	
1957–58	4	1ª Reg.	1st	
1958–59	3	3ª	10th	
1959–60	3	3ª	4th	

Season	Tier	Division	Place	Copa del Rey
1960–61	3	3ª	12th	
1961–62	3	3ª	16th	
1962–63	4	1ª Reg.	15th	
1963–64	5	2ª Reg.	2nd	
1963–64	4	1ª Reg.	2nd	
1965–66	3	3ª	19th	
1966–67	4	1ª Reg.	1st	
1967–68	3	3ª	13th	
1968–69	3	3ª	12th	
1969–70	3	3ª	13th	
1970–71	4	Reg. Pref.	13th	
1971–72	4	Reg. Pref.	20th	
1972–73	5	1ª Reg.	5th	
1973–74	5	1ª Reg.	2nd	
1974–75	5	1ª Reg.	1st	
1975–76	4	Reg. Pref.	3rd	
1976–77	4	Reg. Pref.	3rd	
1977–78	4	3ª	8th	Second round
1978–79	4	3ª	10th	
1979–80	4	3ª	15th	First round

Season	Tier	Division	Place	Copa del Rey
1980–81	4	3ª	15th	
1981–82	4	3ª	20th	
1982–83	5	Reg. Pref.	3rd	
1983–84	4	3ª	16th	
1984–85	4	3ª	15th	
1985–86	4	3ª	20th	
1986–87	5	Reg. Pref.	3rd	
1987–88	4	3ª	19th	
1988–89	5	Reg. Pref.	4th	
1989–90	5	Reg. Pref.	16th	
1990–91	6	1ª Reg.	5th	
1991–92	7	1ª Terr.	1st	
1992–93	6	Pref. Terr.	1st	
1993–94	5	1ª Cat.	1st	
1994–95	4	3ª	6th	
1995–96	3	2ª B	7th	
1996–97	3	2ªB	12th	
1997–98	3	2ª B	6th	
1998–99	3	2ª B	20th	
1999–2000	4	3ª	10th	

Season	Tier	Division	Place	Copa del Rey
2000–01	4	3ª	1st	
2001–02	4	3ª	2nd	Preliminary
2002–03	3	2ª B	17th	
2003–04	4	3ª	6th	
2004–05	4	3ª	9th	
2005–06	4	3ª	3rd	
2006–07	4	3ª	4th	
2007–08	3	2ª B	3rd	
2008–09	3	2ª B	10th	Second round
2009–10	3	2ª B	19th	
2010–11	4	3ª	10th	
2011–12	4	3ª	9th	
2012–13	4	3ª	10th	
2013–14	4	3ª	15th	
2014–15	4	3ª	14th	
2015–16	4	3ª	2nd	
2016–17	3	2ª B	10th	
2017–18	4	3ª	19th	
2018–19	5	1ª Cat.	12th	
2019–20	5	1ª Cat.	6th	

Season	Tier	Division	Place	Copa del Rey
2020–21	5	1ª Cat.	4th	
2021–22	6	1ª Cat.	14th	
2022–23	7	2ª Cat.	8th	
2023–24	8	2ª Cat.	4th	
2024–25	8	2ª Cat.	9th	
2025–26	8	2ª Cat.		

- 9 seasons in Segunda División B
- 33 seasons in Tercera División

== Former coaches ==
- (Spain) Antoni Llebaría Pons (1996–1999)
- (Spain) José Cabezas Benavente (1999)
- (Spain) Manuel Rodríguez Carballo(1999)
- (Spain) Ramón Calderé (2000–2001)
- (Spain) Jaume Bonet (2009–2010)
- (Spain) Óscar Alcides Mena (2016–2017)
- (Spain) Juan Camilo Vázquez (2019–2020)
- (Spain) Jorge Sánchez Pérez (2020–)

== Notable players ==
Note: this list includes players that have appeared in at least 100 league games and/or have reached international status.

- (Andorra) Toni Lima
- (Burkina Faso) Adama Guira
- (Equatorial Guinea) (Spain) Jacinto Elá
- (Equatorial Guinea) Niko Kata
- (Equatorial Guinea) Ruslan Elá
- (Romania) Claudiu Răducanu
- (Sierra Leone) (Spain) Alfi Conteh
- (Spain) Quino Cabrera
- (Spain) Alberto Manga
- (Spain) Joaquín Navarro
- (Spain) Unai Vergara
