= Primera Catalana =

- Founded: 1991
- Country: Spain
- Confederation: FCF
- Number of clubs: 48 (3 groups)
- Level on pyramid: 7
- Promotion to: Lliga Elit
- Relegation to: Segona Catalana
- Domestic cup: Copa Catalunya
- Current champions: Argentona (Group 1 – 1st title); Singuerlín (Group 2 – 1st title); Martorell (Group 3 – 1st title) (2025-26)
- Most championships: CE Manresa; FC Martinenc; CD Masnou; CP San Cristóbal; UE Rapitenca; UE Rubí; FC Santboià (3 titles)
- Website: Official website
- Current: 2026–27 Primera Catalana

The Primera Catalana is the 7th tier of the Spanish football league system and the second highest league in the autonomous community of Catalonia. The league was formed in 1991 to replace Regional Preferent as the first level of Catalonia and was split into 2 groups in 2011.

== Structure ==
The league comprises 48 teams (3 groups of 16 teams). Over the course of a season, which runs annually from September to the following June, each team plays twice against the others in the league, once at 'home' and once 'away', resulting in each team competing in 30 games in total. Three points are awarded for a win, one for a draw and zero for a loss. The teams are ranked in the league table by points gained. In the event that two or more teams finish the season equal in all these respects, teams are separated by head-to-head points, then head-to-head goal difference, then head-to-head goals scored, then goal difference and then goals scored.

From the 2022-23 season the top team in each group was promoted to the Tercera Federación (Group 5). The teams placed between second and sixth places were promoted to the Lliga Elit, a new league that will be played from the 2023–24 season and that will be located between Primera Catalana and Tercera Federación. The teams located between seventh and fourteenth place continued in the Primera Catalana, which will become the seventh tier of Spanish professional football. The last classified of each group and the two worst penultimate places were relegated to Segona Catalana.

== Clubs ==
A total of 170 clubs have played in the Primera Catalana from its inception in 1991 up to and including the 2023–24 season. CF Igualada and UE Tàrrega are the clubs that played the most seasons in the category, with a total of 19 campaigns.

The following 48 clubs are competing in the Primera Catalana during the 2025–26 season.

=== Group 1 ===
Club	Position (2024–25)
Argentona	2nd
Banyoles	8th
Bosc de Tosca	3rd (2Cat – Group 1)
Caldes de Montbui	10th
Can Gibert	6th
Figueres	14th (Lliga Elit)
Granollers	5th
Juventus Lloret	7th
Lloret	16th (Lliga Elit)
Mollet	9th
Palamós	15th (Lliga Elit)
Parets	4th
Premià	4th (2Cat – Group 2)
Sant Jaume	1st (2Cat – Group 1)
Torroella	11th
Tossa	3rd

=== Group 2 ===
Club	Position (2024–25)
APA Poble Sec	1st (2Cat – Group 3)
At. Alpicat	4th (2Cat – Group 5)
Balaguer	8th
Borges Blanques	11th
Cardona	1st (2Cat – Group 5)
Castellar	12th (Group 1)
Gimnàstic Manresa	6th
Igualada	4th
Joanenc	2nd (2Cat – Group 4)
Parc	12th
Pirinaica	4th
Ripollet	1st (2Cat – Group 4)
Sants	9th
CF Singuerlín	5th
Turó de la Peira	7th
Unificación Llefiá	1st (2Cat – Group 2)

=== Group 3 ===
Club	Position (2024–25)
Ascó	10th
At. Vilafranca	9th
Cubelles	3rd (2Cat – Group 6)
El Catllar	12th
Juventud 25 de Septiembre	11th
Martorell	3rd
Natació Terrassa	10th (Group 2)
NSA Camp Joliu	1st (2Cat – Group 6)
Rapitenca	13th (Lliga Elit)
Sant Cugat	5th
Santboià	8th
Sitges	4th
Tàrrega	2nd (2Cat – Group 5)
Terlenka	2nd (2Cat – Group 3)
Tortosa Ebre	6th
Viladecans	7th

== Champions ==
This section lists the past champions of the Primera Catalana.

Season	Team
1991–92	CF Palafrugell
1992–93	UE Sants
1993–94	CF Gavà
1994–95	FC Santboià
1995–96	UE Badaloní
1996–97	UA Horta
1997–98	CF Balaguer
1998–99	Girona FC
1999–2000	UE Sant Andreu
2000–01	CE Manresa
2001–02	EC Granollers
2002–03	UE Cornellà
2003–04	FC Santboià
2004–05	AE Prat
2005–06	CD Blanes
2006–07	UD Cassà
2007–08	UE Cornellà
2008–09	FC Benavent
2009–10	FC Vilafranca
2010–11	UE Olot
2011–12	UE Figueres
2012–13	FC Ascó
2013–14	CF Peralada
2014–15	CD Morell
2015–16	UE Castelldefels
2016–17	FC Santboià
2017–18	CP San Cristóbal
2018–19	FC Andorra
2019–20	Girona FC B (Group 1); CF Montañesa (Group 2)
2020–21	UE Tona (Group 1A); EE Guineueta^{p} (Group 1B); FC Ascó^{p} (Group 2A); CFJ Mollerussa (Group B)
2021–22	CF Montañesa^{p} (Group 1); UE Tona^{p} (Group 2); UE Rapitenca^{p} (Group 3)
2022–23	FC L'Escala^{p} (Group 1); CFJ Mollerussa^{p} (Group 2); CF Reddis^{p} (Group 3)
2023–24	AEC Manlleu^{p} (Group 1); UD San Mauro^{p} (Group 2); CF Vilanova^{p} (Group 3)
2024–25	UE San Juan Atlético de Montcada^{p} (Group 1); FC Martinenc^{p} (Group 2); CF Ciudad Cooperativa^{p} (Group 3)
2025–26	CF Argentona^{p} (Group 1); CF Singuerlín^{p} (Group 2); CF Martorell^{p} (Group 3)

Notes

- ^{p}: Promoted
