= Divisiones Regionales de Fútbol in Catalonia =

Football league in Spain

The Divisiones Regionales de Fútbol (Catalan: Divisions regionals de futbol) in Catalonia are organized by the Federació Catalana de Futbol.

== League chronology ==
Timeline

== Lliga Elit ==
The Lliga Elit is the first level for the Catalan football teams. It is held every year and it stands at the sixth level of Spanish football with teams five promotions away from the top division. Teams from this league progress into the Tercera Federación Group 5.

=== Champions ===
Season	Team
2023–24	Europa B
2024–25	Vic
2025–26	San Juan Atlético Montcada

== Primera Catalana ==
The Primera Catalana is at the seventh level of Spanish football and the second in the Catalan system.

=== Champions ===
Regional Preferente champions

This section lists the past champions of the Primera Catalana under its previous name.

Season	Group 1	Group 2
1968–69	Mataró	
1969–70	Júpiter	
1970–71	Lleida	
1971–72	Masnou	
1972–73	Barcelona B	
1973–74	Manresa	
1974–75	Masnou (2)	
1975–76	Reus	
1976–77	Europa	
1977–78	Olot	
1978–79	Vilafranca	
1979–80	L'Hospitalet	
1980–81	Santboià	
1981–82	Banyoles	
1982–83	Girona	
1983–84	Manlleu	
1984–85	Blanes	Martinenc
1985–86	Gramenet	Reus (2)
1986–87	San Cristóbal	Santboià (2)
1987–88	Horta	Martinenc (2)
1988–89	Cristinenc	Sant Cugat
1989–90	Vilobí	Tortosa
1990–91	Premià	Manresa (2)

Champions under its Primera Catalana

This section lists the past champions of the Primera Catalana under its current name.

Season	Team
1991–92	CF Palafrugell
1992–93	UE Sants
1993–94	CF Gavà
1994–95	FC Santboià
1995–96	UE Badaloní
1996–97	UA Horta
1997–98	CF Balaguer
1998–99	Girona FC
1999–2000	UE Sant Andreu
2000–01	CE Manresa
2001–02	EC Granollers
2002–03	UE Cornellà
2003–04	FC Santboià
2004–05	AE Prat
2005–06	CD Blanes
2006–07	UD Cassà
2007–08	UE Cornellà
2008–09	FC Benavent
2009–10	FC Vilafranca
2010–11	UE Olot
2011–12	UE Figueres
2012–13	FC Ascó
2013–14	CF Peralada
2014–15	CD Morell
2015–16	UE Castelldefels
2016–17	FC Santboià
2017–18	CP San Cristóbal
2018–19	FC Andorra
2019–20	Girona FC B (Group 1) CF Montañesa (Group 2)
2020–21	UE Tona (Group 1A) EE Guineueta^{p} (Group 1B) FC Ascó^{p} (Group 2A) CFJ Mollerussa (Group B)
2021–22	CF Montañesa^{p} (Group 1) UE Tona^{p} (Group 2) UE Rapitenca^{p} (Group 3)
2022–23	FC L'Escala^{p} (Group 1) CFJ Mollerussa^{p} (Group 2) CF Reddis^{p} (Group 3)
2023–24	AEC Manlleu^{p} (Group 1) UD San Mauro^{p} (Group 2) CF Vilanova^{p} (Group 3)
2024–25	UE San Juan Atlético de Montcada^{p} (Group 1) FC Martinenc^{p} (Group 2) CF Ciudad Cooperativa^{p} (Group 3)
2025–26	CF Argentona^{p} (Group 1) CF Singuerlín^{p} (Group 2) CF Martorell^{p} (Group 3)

Notes

- ^{p}: Promoted

== Segona Catalana ==
The Segona Catalana is at the eighth level of the Spanish football league system.

== Tercera Catalana ==
Tercera Catalana is at the ninth level of competition of the Spanish football league in Catalonia.

== Quarta Catalana ==
Quarta Catalana is at the tenth level of competition of the Spanish football league system and is the lowest level in Catalonia.
