= Segona Catalana =

- Founded: 2011
- Country: Spain
- Confederation: FCF
- Number of clubs: 108 (6 groups)
- Level on pyramid: 8
- Promotion to: Primera Catalana
- Relegation to: Tercera Catalana
- Domestic cup: Copa Catalunya
- Most championships: CFJ Mollerussa (6 titles)
- Website: Official website
- Current: 2026–27 Segona Catalana

The Segona Catalana is the eighth tier of the Spanish football league system and the third highest league in the autonomous community of Catalonia. The league was formed in 2011 to replace Territorial Preferent as second level of Catalonia and was split into 6 groups.

== Structure ==
The league comprises 108 teams (6 groups with 18 teams each). Over the course of a season, which runs annually from September to the following June, each team plays twice against the others in the league, once at 'home' and once 'away'. Three points are awarded for a win, one for a draw and zero for a loss. The teams are ranked in the league table by points gained. In the event that two or more teams finish the season equal in all these respects, teams are separated by head-to-head points, then head-to-head goal difference, then head-to-head goals scored, then goal difference and then goals scored.

At the end of the season, the first teams of the groups will be promoted to Primera Catalana, while the teams placed 2-3 in the six groups will play a promotion play-off to determine another six promotions. The last five teams in each group will be relegated to Tercera Catalana

=== Division of the groups ===
- Group 1: Province of Girona
- Groups 2, 3 and 4: Province of Barcelona
- Group 5: Province of Lleida
- Group 6: Province of Tarragona

== Clubs ==
The following 96 clubs are competing in the Segona Catalana during the 2025–26 season.

=== Group 1 ===
- Amer
- Arbúcies
- Atlètic Bisbalenc
- Begur
- Bescanó
- Blanes
- Calonge
- Farners
- Fornells
- Palafrugell
- Porqueres
- Quart
- Roses
- Sant Gregori
- Sporting Vidrerenca
- Vilablareix

=== Group 2 ===
- Cabrils
- Cardedeu
- Cirera
- Inter Barcelona
- Les Franqueses
- Llavaneres
- Lloreda
- Martorelles
- Mataró
- Molletense
- Penya Barcelonista Anguera
- Sant Julià de Vilatorta
- Torelló
- Vic Riuprimer REFO
- Vilamajor
- Vilanova del Vallès

=== Group 3 ===
- Atlético Iberia
- Barceloneta
- Bon Pastor
- Canyelles
- Gavà
- Guineueta
- FAF L'Hospitalet
- Marianao Poblet
- Prat B
- Racing Vallbona
- Sant Ignasi Esportiu
- Sant Ildefons
- Sarrià
- Sector Montserratina
- Sporting Gavà 2013
- Unificación Bellvitge

=== Group 4 ===
- Atlètic Gironella
- Barberà Andalucía
- Berga
- Corbera
- Fátima
- Fundació Terrassa
- Júnior
- Montcada
- Pallejà
- Piera
- Puigreig
- Sabadellenca
- Sant Quirze Vallès
- Sant Vicenç dels Horts
- Tibidabo Torre Romeu
- Vilanova del Camí

=== Group 5 ===
- AEM Lleida
- Agramunt EGG
- Alcarràs
- Alguaire
- Artesa de Segre
- Athlètic Almacelles
- Balàfia
- Capellades
- Guissona
- Juneda
- La Seu d'Urgell
- Linyola
- Olimpic Can Fatjó
- Sallent
- Solsona
- Vallfogona de Balaguer

=== Group 6 ===
- Aldeana
- Amposta
- Atlètic Roda de Barà
- Camarles
- Cambrils
- Canonja
- La Cava
- La Sénia
- Jesús Catalònia
- Montblanc
- Pobla de Mafumet B
- Remolins-Bítem
- San Pedro San Pablo
- Torreforta
- Ulldecona
- Vila-seca
