= La Botjosa =

la Botjosa
- Singular population entity
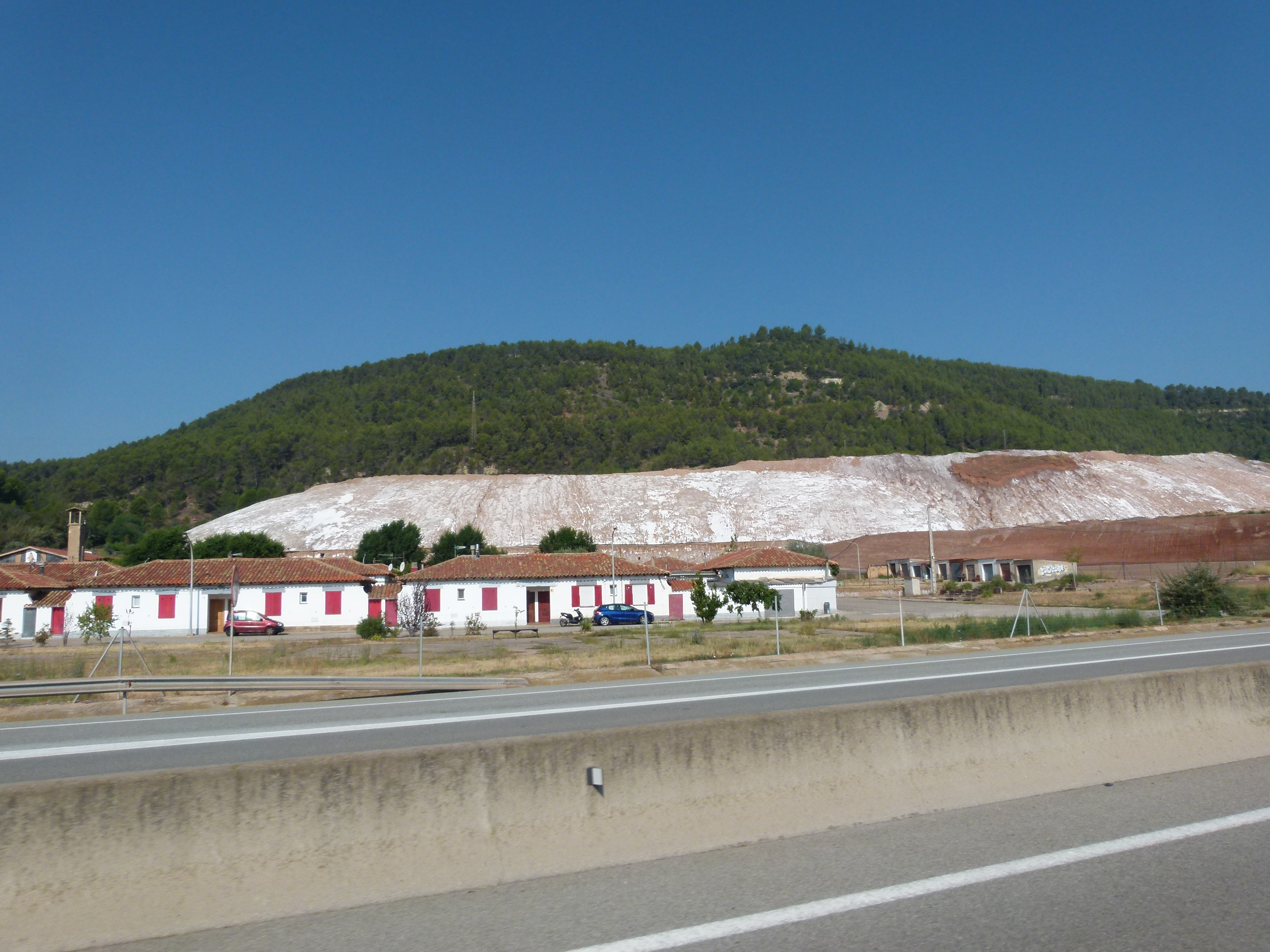
- View of la Botjosa

- Location within Spain Location within Catalonia Location within Province of Barcelona
- Coordinates: 41°48′20.2″N 1°53′45.4″E
- Country: Spain
- A. community: Catalunya
- Province: Barcelona
- Municipality: Sallent

Population (January 1, 2024)
  - Total: 114
- Time zone: UTC+01:00
- Postal code: 08650
- MCN: 08191000100

la Botjosa is a singular population entity in the municipality of Sallent, in Catalonia, Spain.

As of 2024 it has a population of 114 people.
