= Cornet, Sallent =

Cornet
- Singular population entity
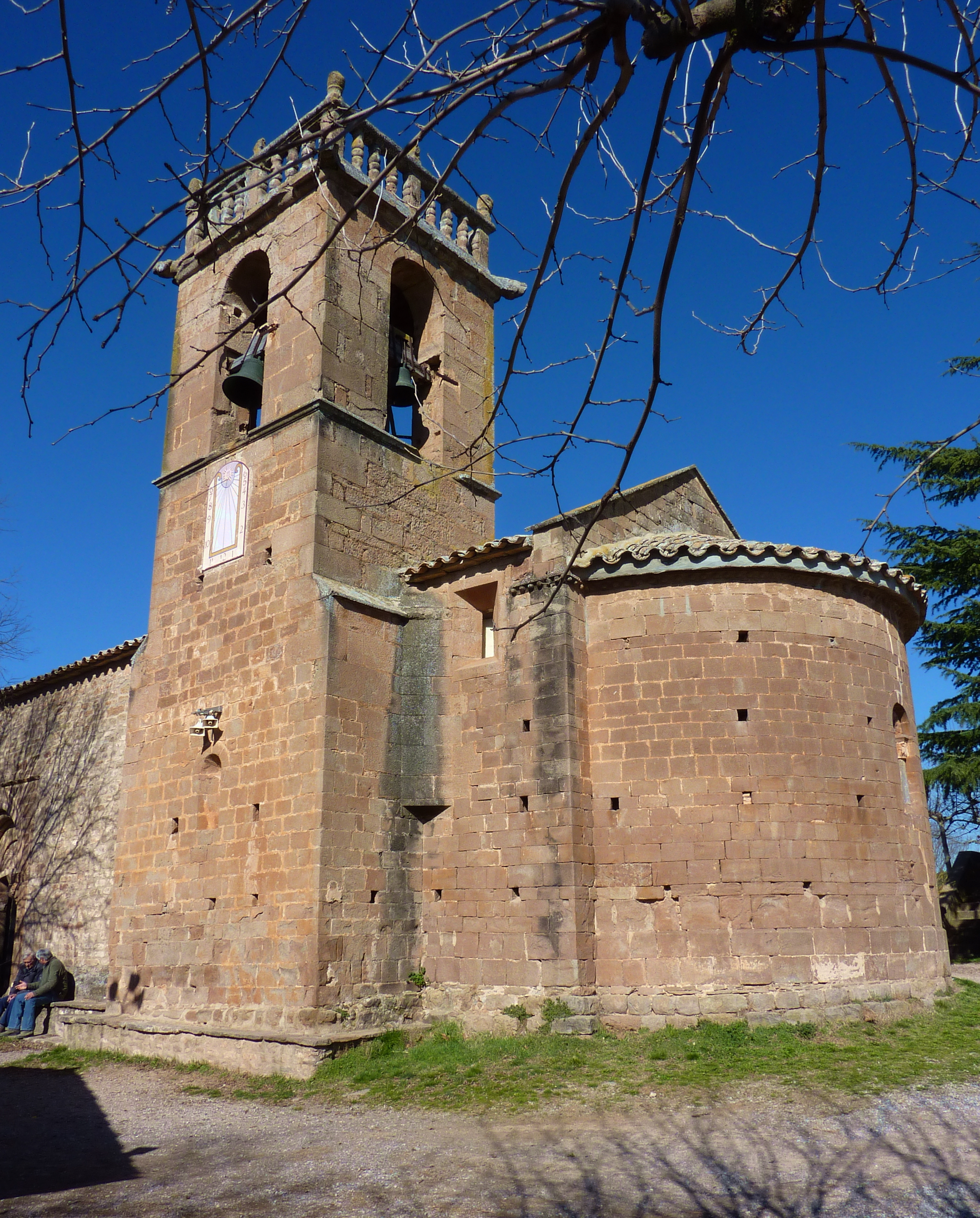
- Church of Cornet

- Location within Spain Location within Catalonia Location within Province of Barcelona
- Coordinates: 41°53′42.8″N 1°56′14.8″E
- Country: Spain
- A. community: Catalunya
- Province: Barcelona
- Municipality: Sallent

Population (January 1, 2024)
  - Total: 46
- Time zone: UTC+01:00
- Postal code: 08650
- MCN: 08191000300
- Website: Official website

Cornet is a singular population entity in the municipality of Sallent, in Catalonia, Spain.

As of 2024 it has a population of 46 people.
