= Kevin De Bruyne Cup =

- The tournament logo
- Organiser(s): KVE Drongen
- Founded: 2015
- Region: Europe
- Teams: 12
- Current champions: (Germany) Bayer 04 Leverkusen (1st title)
- Most championships: (Spain) Barcelona (4 titles)
- Website: kdbcup.be/en

The Kevin De Bruyne Cup, abbreviated KDB Cup, is an international Belgian football tournament for players under the age of 15, which has existed since 2016. The tournament takes place annually at the end of May or beginning of June on the grounds of KVE Drongen in Drongen near Ghent. Professional footballer Kevin De Bruyne gave his name to the tournament and is involved in the organization, which is entirely in the hands of volunteers.

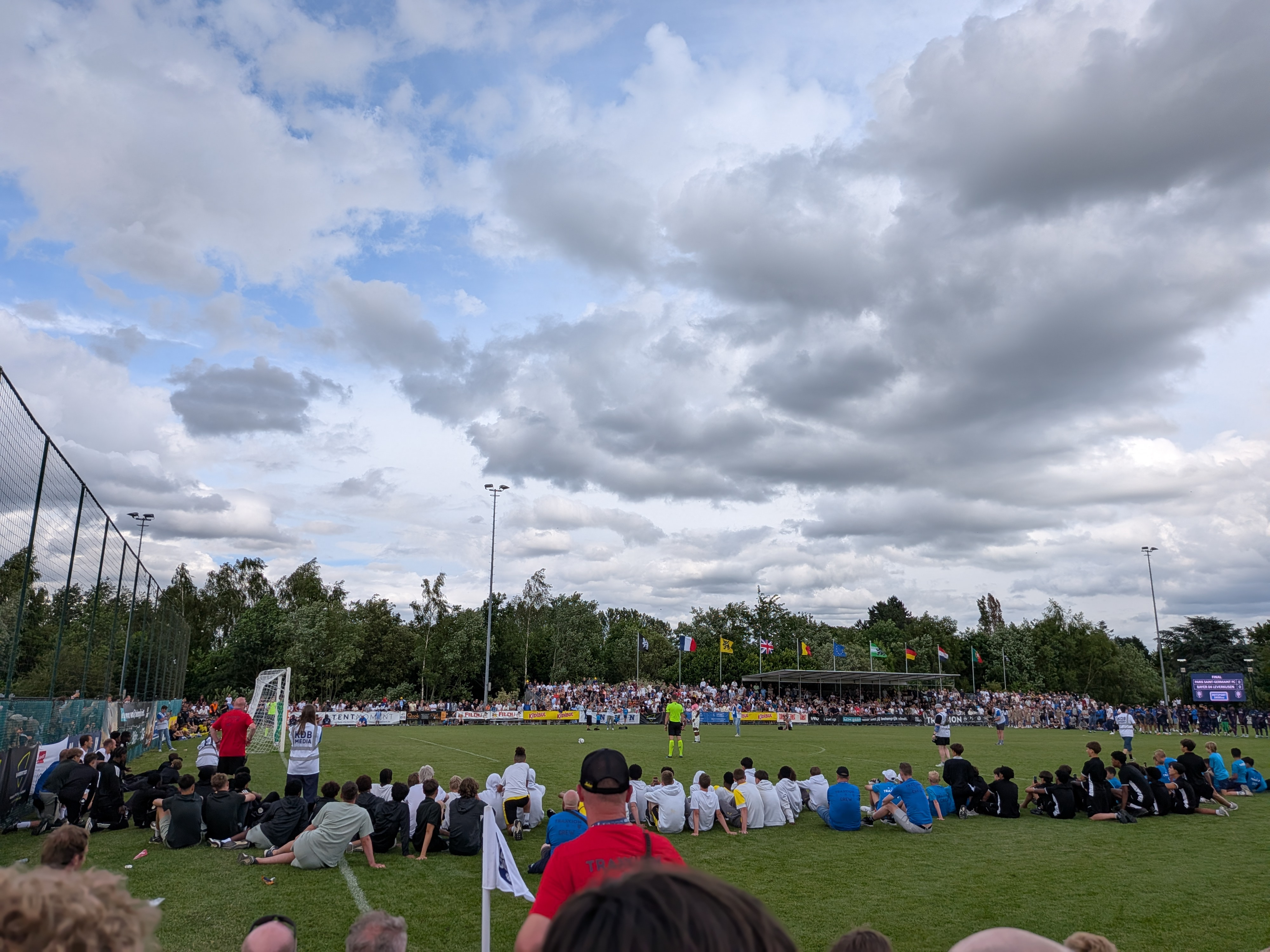
Penalty shoot-out between PSG and Bayer Leverkusen in the 2026 final

== History ==
Kevin De Bruyne grew up in Drongen. He went to school there and was affiliated to KVV Drongen until 1999, at that time one of the three Drongen football clubs. In 1999, he swapped the club for KAA Gent after which a highly successful career would follow. His parents and sister continued to live in Drongen.

In 2014, it was decided to get Kevin De Bruyne and his family back involved with the club, and to organize an international youth tournament. On 27 August 2015, the NPO KDB was established. This loose NPO would organize the first edition in close cooperation with KVE Drongen in 2016.

The tournament is initially designed as a competition for youth and features academy players who often move on to become senior professionals. Some of the players who have made it into the senior club teams RSC Anderlecht or won awards at the tournament include Jamal Musiala, Gonçalo Ramos, FC Barcelona, Úmaro Embaló (best player in 2016), Moriba Kourouma (best player in 2017), and Jérémy Doku (top scorer in 2017).

The event attracts up to 15,000 visitors.

== Records and statistics ==
=== Finals ===
Edition	Year	Winner	Runner-up	Third	Fourth	Source
1	2016	(Portugal) SL Benfica	Austria Wien	(Belgium) Club Brugge KV	(Spain) FC Barcelona	
2	2017	(Spain) FC Barcelona	(Belgium) RSC Anderlecht	(Belgium) KRC Genk	(England) Chelsea FC	
3	2018	(Belgium) RSC Anderlecht	(Netherlands) AZ Alkmaar	(Denmark) Odense BK	(England) Manchester City FC	
4	2019	(England) Chelsea FC	(Belgium) Racing Genk	(Netherlands) Feyenoord Rotterdam	(Netherlands) PSV Eindhoven	
	2020	Cancelled due to COVID-19 pandemic				
	2021	Cancelled due to COVID-19 pandemic				
5	2022	(Spain) FC Barcelona	(Spain) Real Madrid CF	(Belgium) KRC Genk	(England) Manchester City FC	
6	2023	(Spain) FC Barcelona	(France) Paris Saint-Germain FC	(Brazil) SE Palmeiras	(Belgium) Club Brugge KV	
7	2024	(England) Manchester City FC	(Belgium) KAA Gent	(Brazil) SE Palmeiras	(Belgium) KRC Genk	
8	2025	(Spain) FC Barcelona	(Belgium) Club Brugge KV	(France) Paris Saint-Germain	(England) Chelsea FC	
9	2026	(Germany) Bayer 04 Leverkusen	(France) Paris Saint-Germain	(Belgium) Club Brugge KV	(Belgium) RSC Anderlecht	

=== Other team and individual trophies ===
Year	Fair play	Best goalkeeper	Best player	Topscorer
2016	(Spain) FC Barcelona	(Denmark) Andreas Søndergaard; Odense Boldklub	(Portugal) Umaro Embaló; SL Benfica	(Portugal) Umaro Embaló; SL Benfica, 4 goals
2017	(Portugal) SL Benfica	(Spain) Ramon Vila; FC Barcelona	(Guinea) Ilaix Moriba; FC Barcelona	(Belgium) Jeremy Doku; RSC Anderlecht, 11 goals
2018	(Russia) FC Zenit Saint Petersburg	(Netherlands) Daniël Deen; AZ Alkmaar	(Netherlands) Kian Fitz-Jim; AZ Alkmaar	(England) Charlie McNeill; Manchester City FC
2019	(Netherlands) Feyenoord Rotterdam	(England) Josh Clarke; Chelsea FC	(England) Charlie Webster; Chelsea FC	(Spain) Ángel Alarcón; FC Barcelona, 4 goals
2022	(Belgium) Club Brugge KV	(England) Hudson Sands; Chelsea FC	(Spain) Juan Hernández Torres; FC Barcelona	(Netherlands) Emre Ünüvar; AFC Ajax, 5 goals
2023	(Spain) Real Madrid CF	(Belgium) Bas Evers; KAA Gent	(Spain) Guille Fernández; FC Barcelona	(Brazil) Lucas Gabriel Oliveira de Lima; SE Palmeiras, 6 goals
2024	(England) Manchester United FC	(England) Lucas Alvarado; Manchester City FC	(Belgium) Gianluca Okon; Club Brugge KV	(England) Floyd Samba; Manchester City FC, 4 goals
2025	(France) LOSC Lille	(Germany) Yaron Ommer; Bayer Leverkusen	(Spain) Hugo Garces Lagunas; FC Barcelona	(Belgium) Matteo Soria; Club Brugge KV
2026	(England) Chelsea	(Belgium) Loris Wuytens; Racing Genk	(Germany) Haron Eladdouti; Bayer 04 Leverkusen	(Germany) Mike Fahrenkamp; Bayer 04 Leverkusen

=== Participation statistics (as of 2026) ===
Team	Total times participated	Last time participated	Previous best performance
(Belgium) Gent	9	2026	Runners-up (2024)
(Belgium) Club Brugge	9	2026	Runners-up (2025)
(Belgium) Genk	8	2026	Runners-up (2019)
(Spain) Barcelona	7	2025	Winners (2017, 2022, 2023, 2025)
(Belgium) Anderlecht	7	2026	Winners (2018)
(England) Chelsea	7	2026	Winners (2019)
(France) Paris Saint-Germain	7	2026	Runners-up (2023, 2026)
(England) Manchester City	6	2025	Winners (2024)
(Denmark) Odense BK	5	2023	Third place (2018)
(Netherlands) PSV Eindhoven	4	2026	Fourth place (2019)
(Netherlands) Ajax	3	2026	Sixth place (2022, 2023)
(Netherlands) AZ	3	2018	Runners-up (2018)
(Germany) Bayer 04 Leverkusen	3	2026	Winners (2026)
(Germany) Bayern Munich	3	2025	Fifth place (2025)
(Germany) Borussia Dortmund	3	2026	Eighth place (2018)
(Portugal) Benfica	2	2017	Winners (2016)
(Germany) Leipzig	2	2024	Seventh place (2024)
(France) Lille	2	2025	Eighth place (2022)
(England) Manchester United	2	2026	Eighth place (2024)
(Brazil) Palmeiras	2	2024	Third place (2023, 2024)
(Spain) Real Madrid	2	2023	Runners-up (2022)
(England) Arsenal	1	2017	Seventh place (2017)
Austria Wien	1	2016	Runners-up (2016)
(Turkey) Beşiktaş	1	2018	Sixth place (2018)
(England) Everton	1	2016	Eleventh place (2016)
(Netherlands) Feyenoord	1	2019	Third place (2019)
(South Africa) Mamelodi Sundowns	1	2023	Eighth place (2023)
(France) Marseille	1	2017	Eighth place (2017)
(Scotland) Rangers	1	2024	Ninth place (2024)
(Portugal) Sporting CP	1	2026	Sixth place (2026)
(England) Tottenham Hotspur	1	2016	Twelfth place (2016)
(Germany) Wolfsburg	1	2016	Ninth place (2016)
(Russia) Zenit Saint Petersburg	1	2018	Fifth place (2018)
