= Ramon Vila (footballer) =

Spanish footballer (born 2002)

Personal information
- Full name: Ramon Vila Rovira
- Date of birth: 18 February 2002 (age 24)
- Place of birth: Sallent, Spain
- Height: 1.91 m (6 ft 3 in)
- Position: Goalkeeper

Team information
- Current team: Eldense (on loan from Córdoba)
- Number: 1

Youth career
- Sallent
- 2011–2021: Barcelona

Senior career*
Years	Team	Apps	(Gls)
2021–2023	Lleida Esportiu	32	(0)
2023–2024	Atlético Baleares	21	(0)
2024–	Córdoba	2	(0)
2025–	→ Eldense (loan)	36	(0)
- * Club domestic league appearances and goals as of 10 June 2026

Ramon Vila Rovira (born 18 February 2002) is a Spanish footballer who plays as a goalkeeper for CD Eldense, on loan from Córdoba CF.

== Career ==
Born in Sallent de Llobregat, Barcelona, Catalonia, Vila joined FC Barcelona's La Masia in 2011, from hometown side CE Sallent. On 27 July 2021, after finishing his formation, he signed a two-year deal with Segunda División RFEF side Lleida Esportiu.

Vila made his senior debut on 5 September 2021, starting in a 1–1 home draw against AE Prat. A first-choice in his first year, he lost his starting spot in his second.

On 16 June 2023, Vila moved to Primera Federación side CD Atlético Baleares on a two-year contract. On 5 July of the following year, he agreed to a one-year deal with Córdoba CF, newly promoted to Segunda División.

Vila made his professional debut on 24 March 2025, starting in a 1–1 away draw against Real Zaragoza. He spent the campaign as a backup to Carlos Marín, and joined CD Eldense on a one-year loan deal on 6 July 2025.

On 6 July 2026, after helping Eldense to return to the second division at first attempt, Vila renewed with Córdoba until 2029, and had his loan extended for a further year.
