= Sallés de la Serra =

- Singular population entity
- Location within Spain Location within Catalonia Location within Province of Barcelona
- Coordinates: 41°49′55.0″N 1°51′13.5″E
- Country: Spain
- A. community: Catalunya
- Province: Barcelona
- Municipality: Sallent

Population (January 1, 2024)
  - Total: 18
- Time zone: UTC+01:00
- Postal code: 08650
- MCN: 08191000500

Sallés de la Serra is a singular population entity in the municipality of Sallent, in Catalonia, Spain.

As of 2024 it has a population of 18 people.
