= David Batanero =

Spanish footballer

Personal information
- Full name: David Batanero Puigbó
- Date of birth: 27 September 1988 (age 38)
- Place of birth: Barcelona, Spain
- Height: 1.85 m (6 ft 1 in)
- Position: Midfielder

Team information
- Current team: Manresa

Youth career
- 1998–2001: Sallent
- 2001–2002: Sabadell
- 2002–2006: Manresa
- 2006–2007: Damm

Senior career*
Years	Team	Apps	(Gls)
2007–2009	Espanyol B	0	(0)
2007–2008	→ Blanes (loan)	18	(1)
2008–2009	→ Igualada (loan)	20	(3)
2009–2010	Torrellano Illice	6	(0)
2010	Gramenet B	16	(2)
2010–2011	Sallent	28	(13)
2011–2012	Rubí	35	(2)
2012–2013	Palamós	26	(2)
2013	Sallent	7	(3)
2013–2015	Terrassa	65	(9)
2015–2017	Sabadell	32	(2)
2017–2019	Sundsvall	69	(7)
2020	Mjällby	19	(1)
2021	Ibiza	5	(0)
2021–2022	Manresa	9	(0)
2022	Prat	15	(0)
2022–2023	Montijo	31	(1)
2023–2024	Badalona	34	(4)
2024–	Manresa	6	(0)
- * Club domestic league appearances and goals as of 13 October 2024

David Batanero Puigbó (born 27 September 1988) is a Spanish footballer who plays as a midfielder for Manresa.

== Club career ==
Born in Barcelona, Catalonia, Batanero finished his formation with CF Damm. In 2007 he moved to RCD Espanyol, being initially assigned to the reserves in Segunda División B; however, he failed to make an appearance for the club, and subsequently served loan stints at Tercera División sides CD Blanes and CF Igualada.

After cutting ties with the Pericos, Batanero signed for Torrellano Illice CF also in the fourth division. After featuring rarely, he moved to UDA Gramenet's B-side in January 2010.

For the 2010–11 campaign, Batanero represented his first club CE Sallent in the regional leagues. After a one-season spell at UE Rubí, he joined Palamós CF in July 2012.

Batanero was released by Palamós on 17 April 2013, and returned to Sallent two days later. On 14 June, he agreed to a two-year contract with Terrassa FC in the fourth division.

On 1 July 2015, Batanero moved to Segunda División B after signing a one-year contract with CE Sabadell FC. The following 20 June, his contract was automatically renewed for a further campaign, but he suffered a knee injury which kept him out of the first half of the season.

On 29 March 2017, after not being registered with the first team, Batanero cut ties with the Arquelinats. The following day, he moved abroad for the first time in his career after agreeing to a two-year deal with Swedish club GIF Sundsvall.

Batanero made his professional debut on 22 July 2017, starting in a 2–2 away draw against Halmstads BK for the Allsvenskan championship.
