= El Guix =

el Guix
- Singular population entity
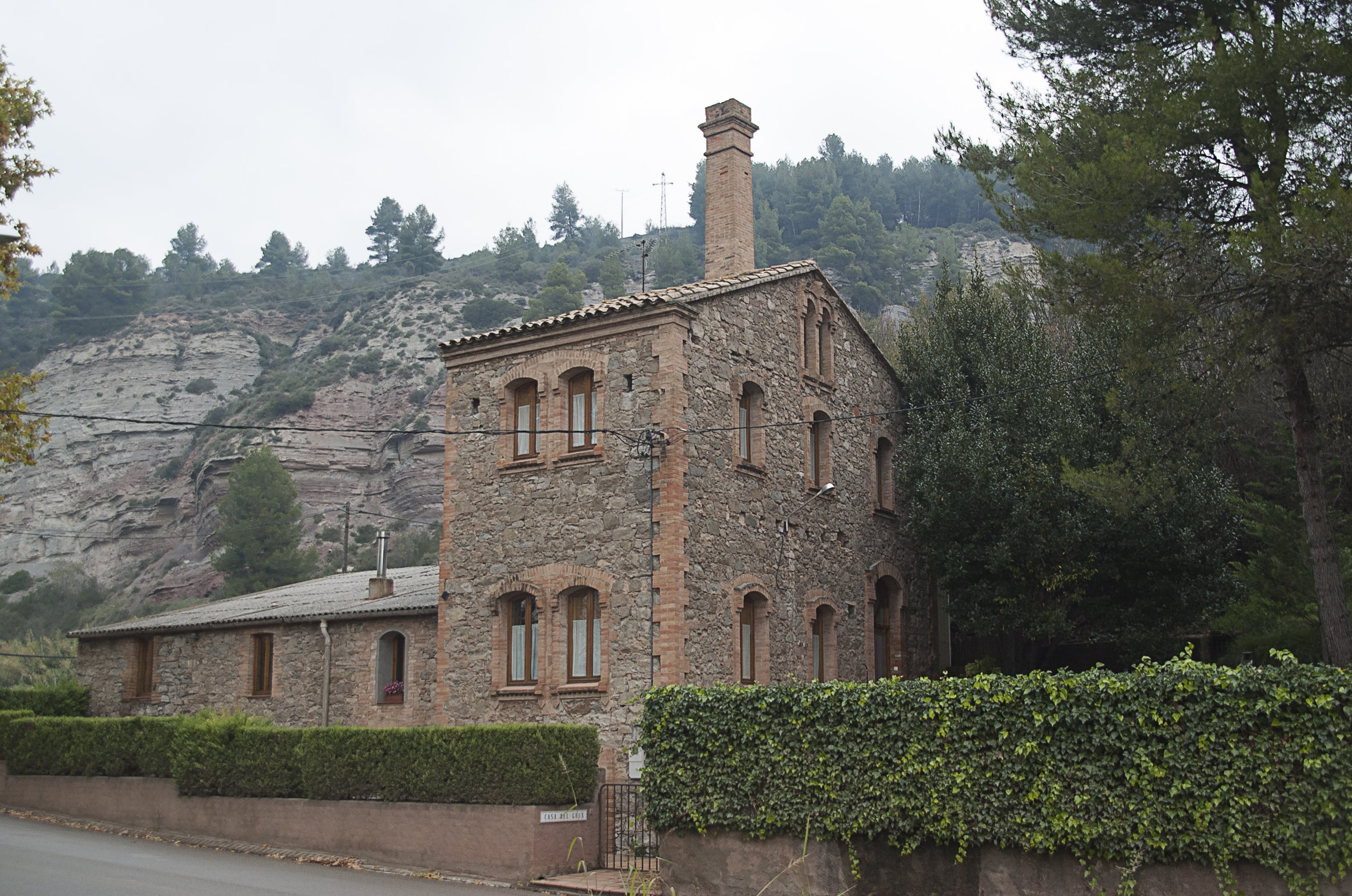
- Factory el Guix

- Location within Spain Location within Catalonia Location within Province of Barcelona
- Coordinates: 41°48′56.0″N 1°54′10.3″E
- Country: Spain
- A. community: Catalunya
- Province: Barcelona
- Municipality: Sallent

Population (January 1, 2024)
  - Total: –
- Time zone: UTC+01:00
- Postal code: 08650
- MCN: 08191001000

el Guix is a singular population entity in the municipality of Sallent, in Catalonia, Spain.
