= Kevin De Bruyne =

Belgian footballer (born 1991)

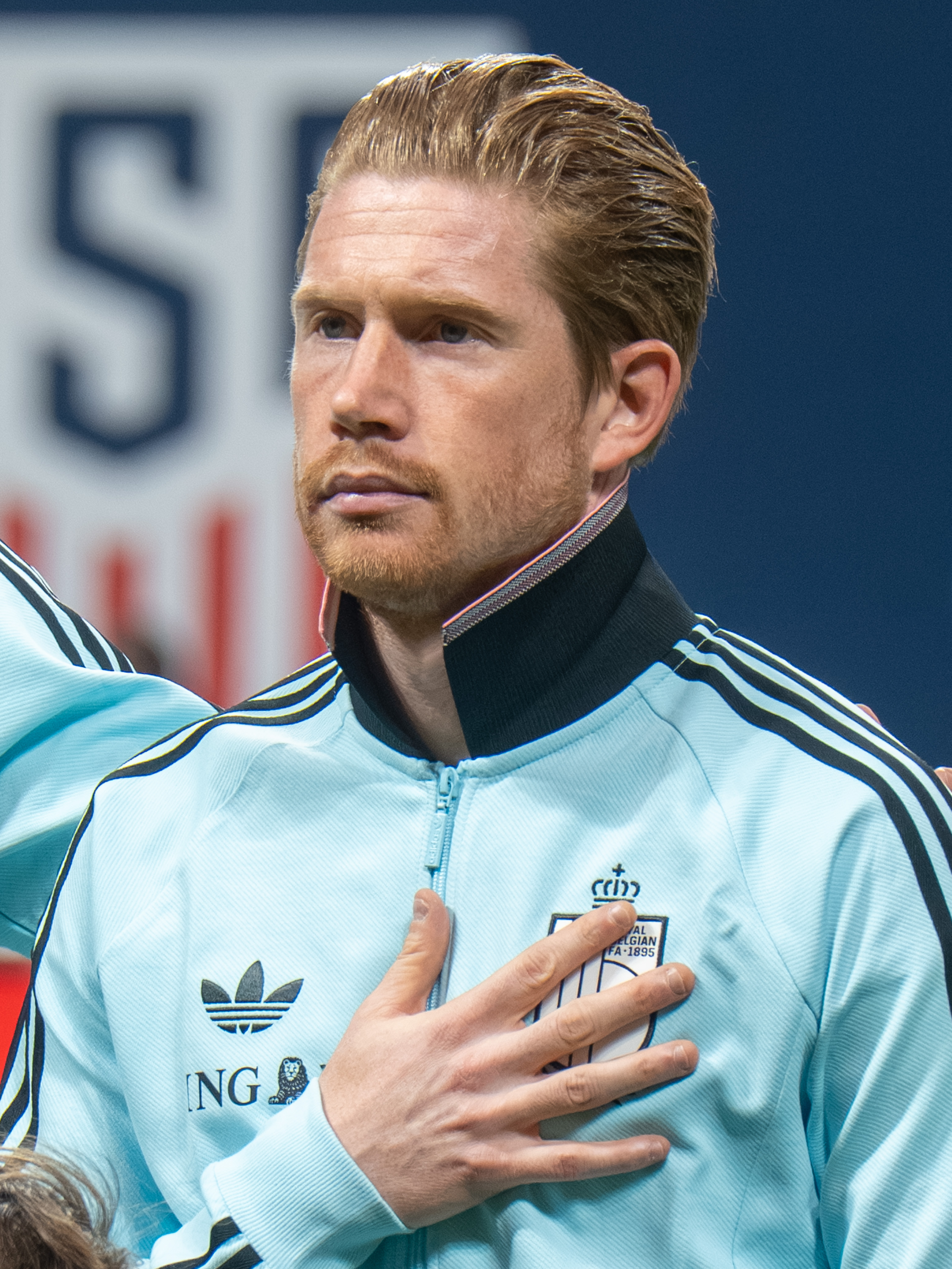
- De Bruyne with Belgium in 2026

Personal information
- Full name: Kevin De Bruyne
- Date of birth: 28 June 1991 (age 35)
- Place of birth: Drongen, Belgium
- Height: 1.81 m (5 ft 11 in)
- Position: Midfielder

Team information
- Current team: Napoli
- Number: 11

Youth career
- 1997–1999: KVV Drongen
- 1999–2005: Gent
- 2005–2008: Genk

Senior career*
Years	Team	Apps	(Gls)
2008–2012	Genk	97	(16)
2012–2014	Chelsea	3	(0)
2012–2013	→ Werder Bremen (loan)	33	(10)
2014–2015	VfL Wolfsburg	52	(13)
2015–2025	Manchester City	285	(72)
2025–	Napoli	30	(9)

International career^{‡}
2008–2009	Belgium U18	7	(1)
2009	Belgium U19	10	(1)
2011	Belgium U21	2	(0)
2010–	Belgium	129	(41)
Medal record
Men's football
Representing Belgium
FIFA World Cup
Third place	2018 Russia
- * Club domestic league appearances and goals as of 20:01, 21 November 2026 (UTC) ‡ National team caps and goals as of 22:45, 15 November 2026 (UTC)

Kevin De Bruyne (Dutch pronunciation: [ˈkɛvɪn də ˈbrœynə]; born 28 June 1991) is a Belgian professional footballer who plays as a midfielder for Serie A club Napoli and the Belgium national team. Widely regarded as one of the greatest players of his generation and one of the best players in Premier League history, he has been described as a "complete" footballer.

After spending most of his youth career at Gent, De Bruyne began his professional senior career at Genk, where he was a regular player when they won the 2010–11 Belgian Pro League. In 2012, he joined English club Chelsea, where he was used sparingly and then loaned to Werder Bremen. He signed with VfL Wolfsburg for £18 million in 2014, establishing himself as one of the best players in the Bundesliga, and was integral in the club's 2014–15 DFB-Pokal win. In the summer of 2015, De Bruyne joined Manchester City for a then-club record £54 million. Making 422 appearances for the club, he won the UEFA Champions League, six Premier League titles, five League Cups, and two FA Cups. In 2017–18, he had a significant role in City becoming the only Premier League team to attain 100 points in a single league season. In 2019–20, De Bruyne equalled the then-record for most assists in a Premier League season and was named Player of the Season, the award he won for the second time in 2021–22. He was again heavily involved in 2022–23, as Manchester City sealed the continental treble in their most successful season to date. In June 2025, he joined Napoli on a free transfer following his departure from City at the end of the 2024–25 season.

De Bruyne made his full international debut for Belgium in 2010, and he has since earned over 120 caps, scoring 41 goals for his country. He was a member of the Belgian squads that reached the quarter-finals at the 2014 FIFA World Cup, UEFA Euro 2016 and the 2026 World Cup. De Bruyne was named in the Fan Dream Team of the 2018 World Cup, as Belgium finished in third place, as well as appearing at Euro 2020, the 2022 World Cup and Euro 2024.

De Bruyne has been named in the UEFA Champions League Squad of the Season and IFFHS Men's World Team six times each, ESM Team of the Year and the FIFPRO World 11 five times each, the UEFA Team of the Year three times, and the France Football World XI and the Bundesliga Team of the Year once each. He has also won the Premier League Playmaker of the Season three times, the PFA Players' Player of the Year twice, Manchester City's Player of the Year four times, the UEFA Champions League Midfielder of the Season, the Bundesliga Player of the Year, the Footballer of the Year (Germany), the Belgian Sportsman of the Year and the IFFHS World's Best Playmaker three times each. He was nominated for the prestigious Ballon d'Or award several times, ending third in the 2022 edition, and fourth in 2023.

== Club career ==
=== Genk ===
De Bruyne began his career with hometown club KVV Drongen in 1997. Two years later, he joined KAA Gent under the guidance of coaches Jan Troos and Charly Musonda. They focused on his technique: basics, passing, shooting, dribbling. Later in an interview De Bruyne mentioned that their individual coaching had a great impact on his development. In 2005 he moved to Genk, where De Bruyne continued his development in their youth set-up and was rewarded for his progress by being promoted to the first team squad in 2008. From an Interview with his youth club KAA Gent, it was revealed that De Bruyne was a Liverpool fan and an admirer of Michael Owen.

De Bruyne made his first team debut for Genk in a 3–0 defeat at Charleroi on 9 May 2009. Having established himself in the team the following season, on 7 February 2010, De Bruyne scored his first goal for the club, which secured all three points for Genk in a 1–0 win against Standard Liège. He scored five goals and made 16 assists in 32 league matches during the 2010–11 season as Genk were crowned Belgian champions for the third time. On 29 October 2011, De Bruyne scored his first hat-trick for Genk against Club Brugge, which ended in a 5–4 win for Genk. On 28 January 2012, De Bruyne scored a brace against OH Leuven in a 5–0 win. On 18 February 2012, De Bruyne scored his first goal back at Genk following his agreed transfer to Chelsea and also assisted the other goal in a 1–2 away win against Mons. De Bruyne ended the season by wrapping up the scoring in a 3–1 victory over Gent. He finished the league campaign with eight goals from 28 appearances.

=== Chelsea ===
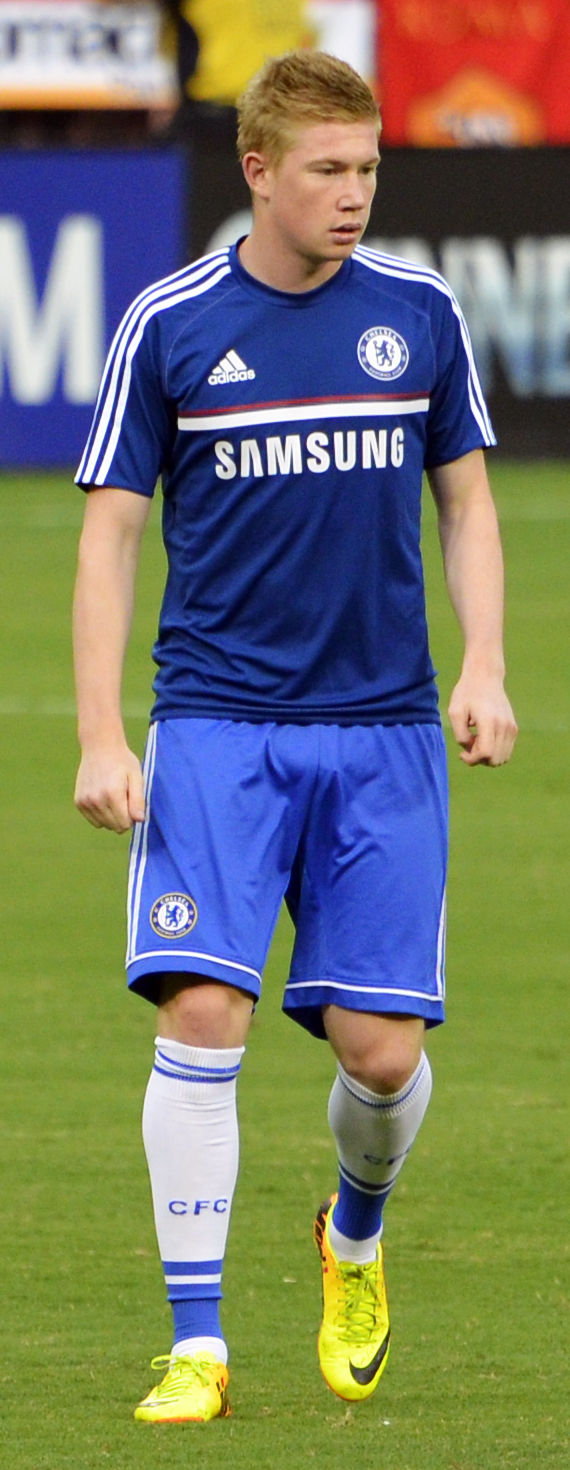
De Bruyne training with Chelsea in 2013

On 31 January 2012, on the winter transfer deadline day, Premier League club Chelsea and Genk announced the permanent signing of De Bruyne, with the fee rumoured to be in the region of £7 million. He signed a five-and-a-half-year contract at Stamford Bridge, but would stay at Genk for the remainder of the 2011–12 season. De Bruyne told the club website, "To come to a team like Chelsea is a dream but now I have to work hard to achieve the level that's necessary." On 18 July 2012, De Bruyne made his debut for Chelsea in a friendly match against Major League Soccer (MLS) side Seattle Sounders FC in a 4–2 win. De Bruyne also played the first half against Ligue 1 giants Paris Saint-Germain at Yankee Stadium, New York City.

==== Werder Bremen (loan) ====
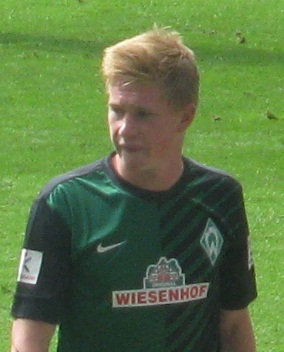
De Bruyne with Werder Bremen in 2012

On 31 July 2012, Chelsea announced that De Bruyne was to join Werder Bremen in the Bundesliga on a season-long loan deal. He scored his first goal for Bremen in a 3–2 defeat to Hannover 96 on 15 September, netting from 11 yards out after being played in by Eljero Elia. He continued his good form, scoring in Bremen's next game, a 2–2 draw with VfB Stuttgart, on 23 September. De Bruyne got back on the score sheet on 18 November, scoring the winning goal – despite his team being down to 10 men – as Bremen came from a goal down to defeat Fortuna Düsseldorf 2–1.

De Bruyne scored his first goal in over two months on 4 May 2013, since netting a consolation goal in Bayern Munich's 6–1 hammering of Bremen, putting his side up 2–0 at home to TSG 1899 Hoffenheim before a late brace from Sven Schipplock meant that the game finished 2–2. He followed this up with a goal in Bremen's next match, securing a place in the Bundesliga for the next season with a 1–1 draw against Eintracht Frankfurt on 11 May.

==== Return to Chelsea ====
After a successful loan spell in the Bundesliga with Werder Bremen, De Bruyne was linked with a move to stay in Germany with either Borussia Dortmund or Bayer Leverkusen. Incoming manager José Mourinho, however, assured De Bruyne he was a part of Chelsea's plan for the future, and the player officially returned to Chelsea on 1 July 2013.

De Bruyne injured a knee while scoring his first goal for Chelsea, in a pre-season friendly game against a Malaysia XI, but was fit to make his competitive debut on the opening day of the 2013–14 Premier League season against Hull City, and made an assist for the first goal in a 2–0 win.

=== Wolfsburg ===
==== 2013–14 season ====
On 18 January 2014, Wolfsburg signed De Bruyne for a fee of £18 million (€22 million). On 25 January 2014, he made his debut for Wolfsburg in a 3–1 home loss against Hannover 96. On 12 April 2014, De Bruyne assisted 2 goals in their 4–1 home win against 1. FC Nürnberg. After a week he scored his first goal for Wolfsburg in 3–1 away win against Hamburger SV. He also scored in the last two matches of the Bundesliga helping his team to win against VfB Stuttgart and Borussia Mönchengladbach.

==== 2014–15 season ====
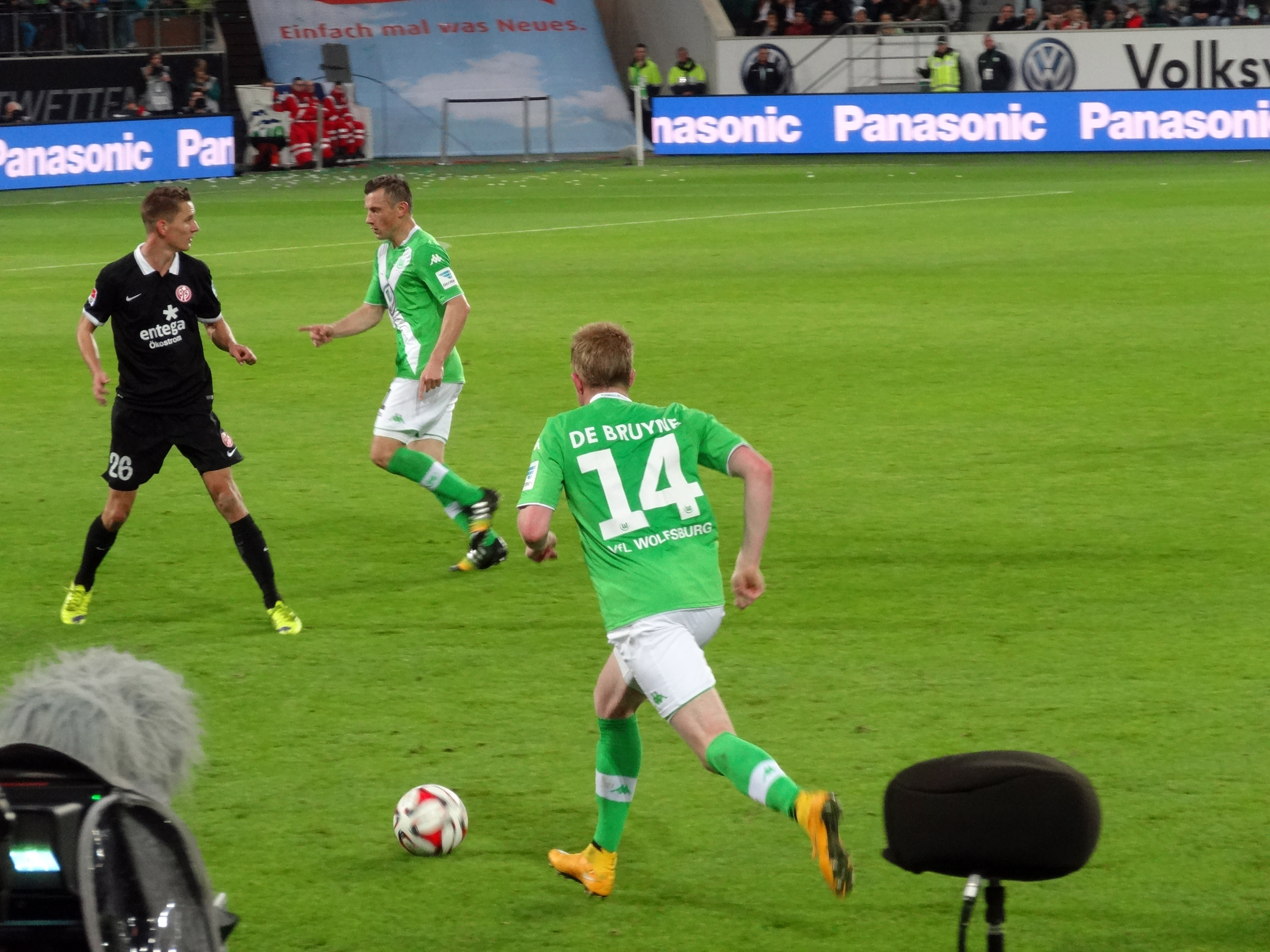
De Bruyne playing for Wolfsburg against Mainz in 2014

De Bruyne scored his first goal of the 2014–15 season on 2 October 2014, volleying in a clearance from outside the box to salvage a 1–1 draw against Lille in the Europa League. In the third group match away to Krasnodar on 23 October, De Bruyne scored twice as Wolfsburg secured their first win in the competition with a 4–2 victory. On 30 January 2015, he scored another brace in a 4–1 home win against Bayern Munich, their first Bundesliga defeat since April 2014. On 1 March 2015, De Bruyne assisted three goals in a 5–3 win over his former club Werder Bremen.

On 12 March 2015, De Bruyne scored two goals in a 3–1 first leg Europa League round of 16 victory over Internazionale. On 15 March 2015, he scored one goal and assisted another two in a 3–0 victory over SC Freiburg.

De Bruyne ended the league season with 10 goals and 21 assists, the latter a new Bundesliga record, as Wolfsburg finished second in the Bundesliga and qualified for the 2015–16 UEFA Champions League. On 30 May 2015, he started and scored in the 2015 DFB-Pokal Final as Die Wölfe defeated Borussia Dortmund 3–1 at the Olympiastadion in Berlin.

De Bruyne ended his break-out season with 16 goals and 27 assists in all competitions, and was named the 2015 Germany Footballer of the Year.

==== 2015–16 season ====
De Bruyne began the season by winning the 2015 DFL-Supercup against Bayern Munich, providing the cross for Nicklas Bendtner's 89th-minute equaliser for a 1–1 draw and then scoring in the subsequent penalty shootout. On 8 August 2015, he continued his good form by scoring his first goal of the season, and providing two assists in a 4–1 win at Stuttgarter Kickers in the first round of the DFB-Pokal.

In August, in the midst of transfer speculation, De Bruyne said that he would not force Wolfsburg to sell him, but also said that he could not ignore interest from Manchester City, saying: "If an offer does come, I will hear about it and how much it is, but I have not yet heard anything... I would not go to England just to prove that I can play there. I do not have to go to England... If I go there it's because for me and for my family it is a good choice. That's the key for me."

On 10 August, it was reported that Manchester City had made a second bid for De Bruyne worth £47 million. Wolfsburg sporting director, Klaus Allofs, said the club would fight to keep him, saying "I think some other clubs have definitely turned Kevin's head... Some huge figures are doing the rounds and I can understand why Kevin is leaving everything open." On 27 August, it was reported that City had made a further bid for De Bruyne worth £58 million. Klaus Allofs said that City had made an "astonishing" wage offer to De Bruyne.

=== Manchester City ===
==== 2015–16 season ====
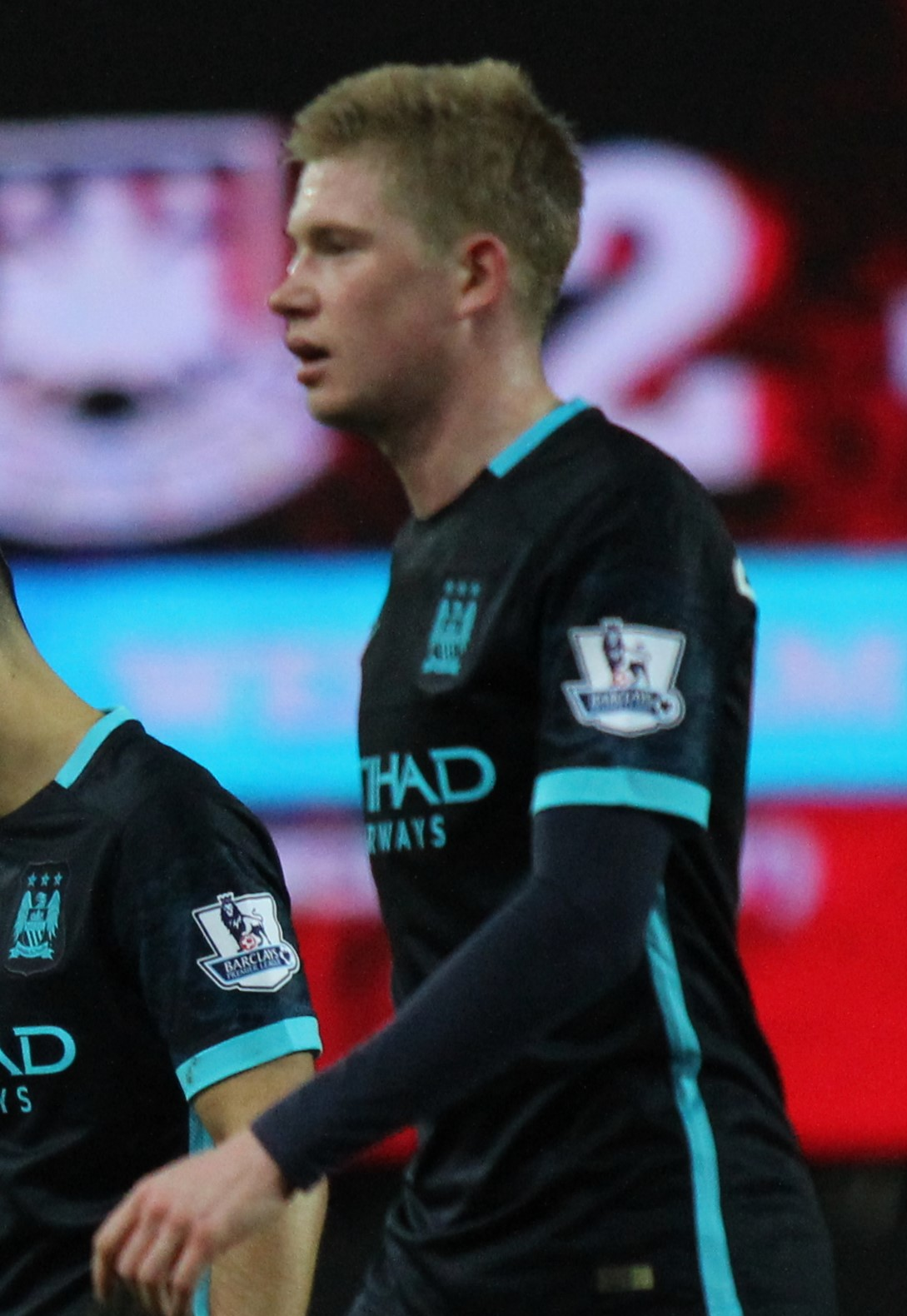
De Bruyne playing for Manchester City in January 2016

On 30 August 2015, Manchester City announced the arrival of De Bruyne on a six-year contract, for a reported club-record fee of £55 million (€75 million), making him the second most expensive transfer in British football history after Ángel Di María's move to Manchester United in 2014. He made his debut for the team in the Premier League on 12 September against Crystal Palace, replacing the injured Sergio Agüero in the 25th minute. On 19 September, he scored his first goal for the club against West Ham United in first half stoppage time in an eventual 2–1 loss. He went on to score in a 4–1 League Cup win against Sunderland, on 22 September and a 4–1 loss to Tottenham Hotspur in the Premier League on 26 September. On 3 October, he scored in the team's 6–1 win against Newcastle United.

On 2 October, De Bruyne was announced as one of the players on the longlist for the prestigious FIFA Ballon d'Or award, alongside teammates Agüero and Yaya Touré. Just 18 days later, on 20 October he was revealed by FIFA as one of the players on the 23-man shortlist for the Ballon d'Or. On 21 October, De Bruyne scored an injury-time winner against Sevilla in the UEFA Champions League, to take City within one point of group leaders Juventus, with three games remaining. On 1 December, he scored a brace in a 4–1 win over Hull City to send Manchester City through to the semi-finals of the Football League Cup.

On 27 January 2016, De Bruyne scored a goal in a League Cup semi-final 3–1 victory over Everton, but sustained an injury to his right knee that would keep him out of the team for two months. On 2 April, De Bruyne made his return from injury in a 4–0 win against Bournemouth at Dean Court, scoring the team's second goal in the twelfth minute. Four days later, he scored the opening goal in a 2–2 draw with Paris Saint-Germain in the UEFA Champions League quarter-final first-leg at the Parc des Princes. On 12 April, De Bruyne scored the winning goal against Paris Saint-Germain, advancing Manchester City to the Champions League semi-finals, for the first time in the club's history, on an aggregate score of 3–2. Writing in The Independent, Mark Ogden said, "It was a stunning goal from the Belgian, who took a touch to control the ball before curling it beyond Kevin Trapp from the edge of the penalty area." De Bruyne's next goal came on 8 May in a 2–2 draw against Arsenal.

==== 2016–17 season ====
"I think he is a special, outstanding player. He makes everything. Without the ball he is the first fighter, and with the ball he is clear – he sees absolutely everything."

— Pep Guardiola on 17 September 2016 describing De Bruyne after his brilliant performances for City

On 10 September 2016, De Bruyne scored and assisted in the first Manchester derby of the season which City won 2–1 and was awarded the Man of the Match. On 17 September, De Bruyne was awarded the Man of the Match, in a 4–0 win over Bournemouth. De Bruyne scored the first, assisted the fourth, and provided key passes on both the second and third goals. After the international break, Manchester City drew their next game, against Everton, played on 15 October with the scoreline finishing at 1–1. Agüero and De Bruyne both missed their penalties while Nolito came off the bench to equalise for City.

On 1 November 2016, De Bruyne scored from a free-kick in the club's 3–1 win over Barcelona. On 21 January 2017, De Bruyne was involved in both of City's goals, as he netted once himself and also assisted Leroy Sané's, in a 2–2 home draw with Tottenham Hotspur; he was subsequently named man of the match. On 19 March, De Bruyne displayed an excellent performance in a 1–1 draw against Liverpool at the Etihad Stadium, where he set up a goal for Agüero.

==== 2017–18 season ====
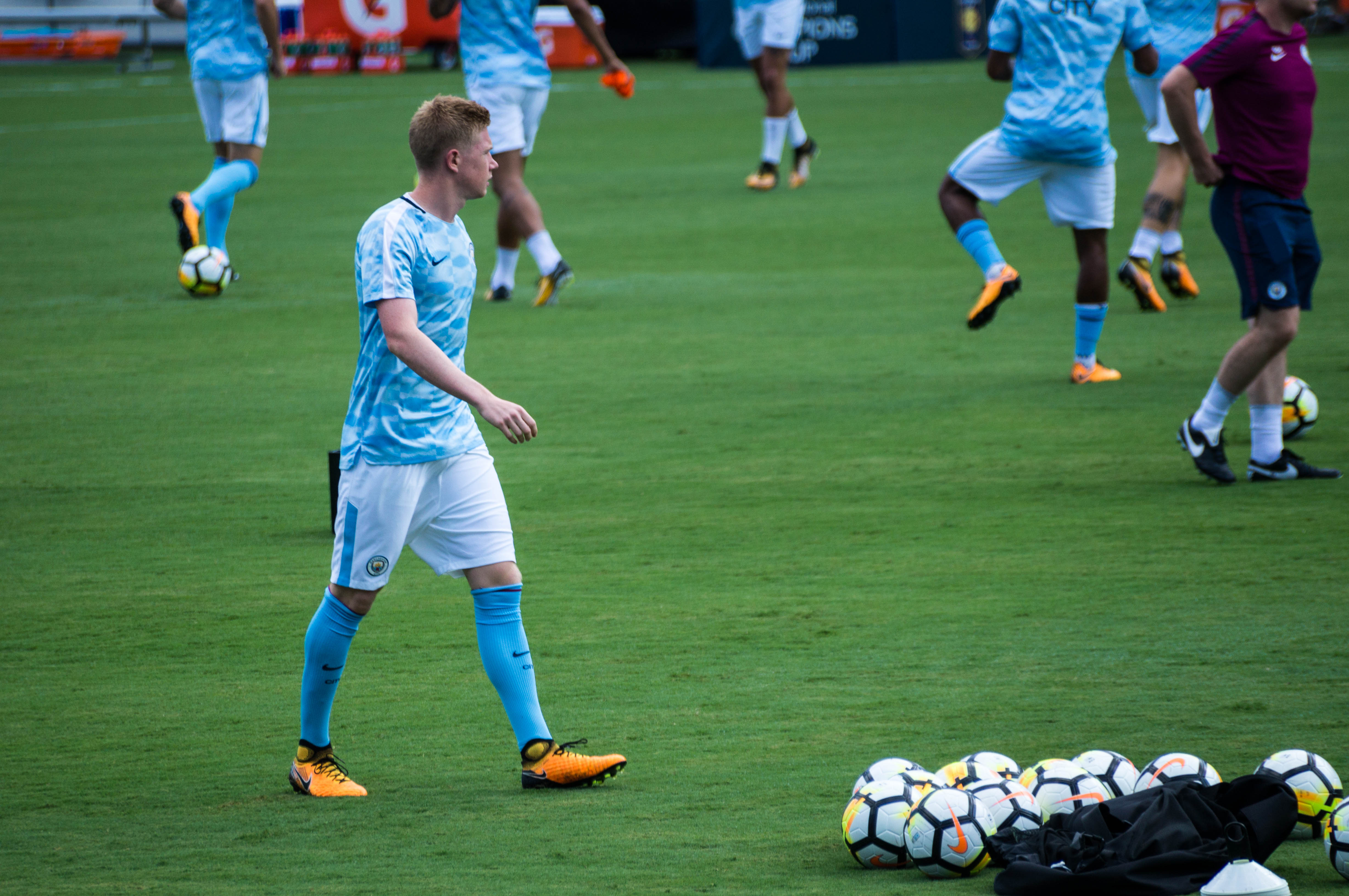
De Bruyne during a pre-season training session with Manchester City in 2017

De Bruyne set up both Agüero's and Gabriel Jesus' goals, on 9 September 2017, in a 5–0 home victory over Liverpool. On 16 September, De Bruyne assisted Agüero for his first goal in an eventual 6–0 win over Watford. On 26 September, De Bruyne scored his first goal of the 2017–18 season in a 2–0 win over Shakhtar Donetsk. On 30 September, he scored his first goal of the 2017–18 Premier League season, as City beat his former club Chelsea with a 1–0 scoreline at Stamford Bridge. On 14 October, De Bruyne provided two assists in a 7–2 win over Stoke City. On 5 November, De Bruyne scored in a 3–1 win over Arsenal. On 18 November, he scored in a 2–0 away win over Leicester City. On 29 November, he scored City's opener and assisted Raheem Sterling's last-minute winner in a 2–1 win over Southampton.

On 13 December 2017, De Bruyne scored in a 4–0 away win over Swansea City, which extended their record run of consecutive top-flight wins to 15 games. On 16 December, he scored in a 4–1 win over Tottenham Hotspur, with Pep Guardiola saying that De Bruyne is "helping the club become a better institution". On 27 December, De Bruyne provided an assist for Sterling's goal in a 1–0 win over Newcastle United. On 9 January, De Bruyne scored in a 2–1 win over Bristol City in the first leg of the semi-finals of the EFL Cup. On 20 January, he provided an assist for Agüero's first goal of the game (who scored a hat-trick in the game), in a 3–1 win over Newcastle United.

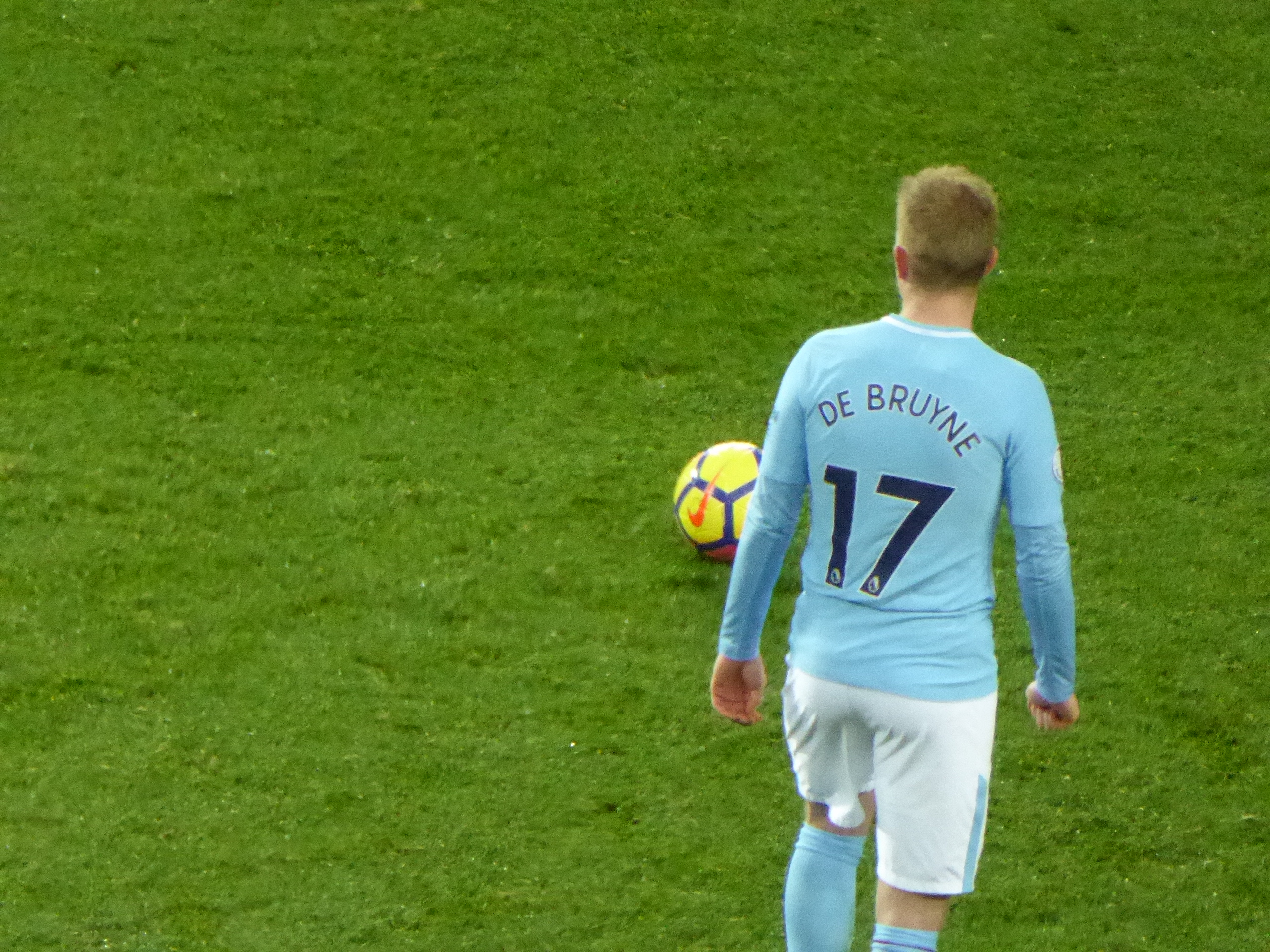
De Bruyne during the Manchester derby at Old Trafford, on 10 December 2017, which City won 2–1

On 22 January 2018, De Bruyne signed a new long-term contract with the club, keeping him at the club until 2023. On 23 January, he scored the winning goal in a 3–2 win over Bristol City in the EFL Cup semi-final second leg, which helped City advance to the final, having won the tie by an aggregate scoreline of 5–3. On 31 January, he scored and assisted in a 3–0 win over West Bromwich Albion, and was voted BBC Man of the Match. On 10 February, he provided three assists, two for Agüero and one for Raheem Sterling, in a 5–1 win over Leicester City, taking his assists tally to 14. On 25 February, he started in the 2018 EFL Cup Final against Arsenal, and played the whole 90 minutes, with Manchester City winning 3–0 to obtain their first piece of silverware of the 2017–18 season, and their first trophy overall under Pep Guardiola.

On 31 March 2018, he provided an assist for Gabriel Jesus in a 3–1 win over Everton, ensuring that City would require only one more win to secure the Premier League title. On 22 April, he scored in a 5–0 win over Swansea City. On 13 May, on the final day of the season, De Bruyne assisted Gabriel Jesus' winning goal in a 1–0 win over Southampton, which took champions City's total points tally to 100. De Bruyne was also voted as BBC Man of the Match. For his 16 assists registered across the league season, De Bruyne won the inaugural Premier League Playmaker of the Season award. He was also selected in the PFA Team of the Year, and was also voted as Manchester City Player of the Season.

==== 2018–19 season ====
On 15 August 2018, De Bruyne suffered a knee injury during a training session, with several news websites reporting that he could potentially not play for up to three months. Two days later, Manchester City confirmed that he had suffered a lesion of the lateral collateral ligament in his right knee, with no surgery required, and that he was expected to not play for three months. Soon after De Bruyne returned to action in October 2018, he once again suffered a knee ligament injury in the fourth round of the EFL Cup against Fulham. The injury was expected to keep him out for 5–6 weeks but he resumed full training much earlier than expected after only 3 weeks out. He came on as substitute in the FA Cup final against Watford, scoring the third goal and assisting two more, as City won the first-ever domestic treble in English men's football. His performances meant he was named Man of the Match.

==== 2019–20 season ====
On 30 November 2019, De Bruyne scored a half-volley in a 2–2 draw against Newcastle in the league. That strike was later voted as Premier League Goal of the Month for November. On 15 December, he scored a brace in a 3–0 Premier League win over Arsenal at the Emirates.

De Bruyne scored his 50th City goal in all competitions on 26 February 2020 in their 2–1 victory, coming from behind, over Real Madrid in their Champions League Round of 16 clash.

In the final Premier League match of the season, City beat Norwich City 5–0 at home. De Bruyne scored two goals and registered his 20th league assist, which equalled Thierry Henry's record for the most assists in a season, and also won his second Playmaker of the Season award. In addition he became the first player in history to reach 20 assists in a single season in two of Europe's top five leagues. His long range curler in that game also won him Premier League Goal of the Month for the second time in the season.

At the end of the season he was awarded the Premier League Player of the Season after scoring 13 goals, providing 20 assists and creating 104 chances from open play, the most for a player in any of Europe's top five leagues since 2006.

He was also named in the PFA Team of the Year and won the PFA Player of the Year award, becoming the first ever Manchester City player to win it.

==== 2020–21 season ====
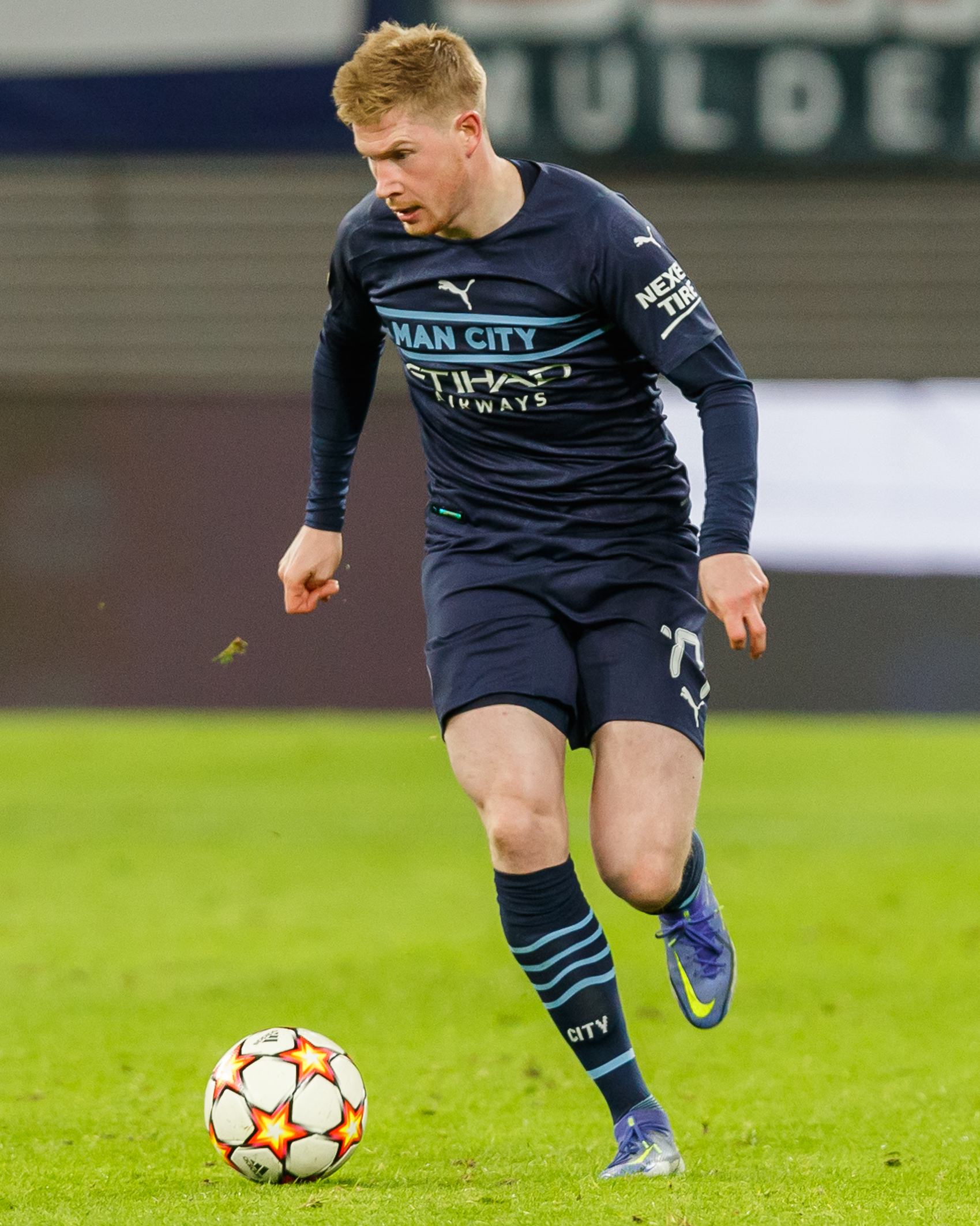
De Bruyne on the ball for Manchester City in the Champions League against RB Leipzig in 2021

On 21 September 2020, De Bruyne scored and assisted in a 3–1 away win over Wolverhampton Wanderers in City's first game of the season. With the crucial visit of the Premier League champions, Liverpool, De Bruyne assisted Gabriel Jesus' equaliser before winning a penalty, which he subsequently fired wide. The game ended in a 1–1 draw. On 7 April, De Bruyne signed a four-year contract, after negotiating it with help of statistical data to make case for a 30% pay increase.

On 25 April 2021, De Bruyne's free-kick was headed into the goal by Aymeric Laporte, allowing City to win 1–0 against Tottenham Hotspur in the EFL Cup Final at Wembley Stadium. On 28 April, he scored a goal in a 2–1 away win over Paris Saint-Germain in the Champions League semi-finals. On 29 May, De Bruyne had a head injury after colliding with Antonio Rüdiger in the second half of the Champions League Final, to be substituted by Gabriel Jesus; however, his team lost 1–0 against his former club Chelsea. Medical scans after the game revealed De Bruyne to have suffered acute nose bone and left orbital fractures, placing doubt on his participation in the rescheduled UEFA Euro 2020 tournament.

At the end of the season, De Bruyne was awarded with the PFA Player's Player of the Year award.

==== 2021–22 season ====
On 26 April 2022, De Bruyne scored the fastest Champions League semi-final goal after 93 seconds in a 4–3 win over Real Madrid in the first leg. On 11 May, he scored four goals inside 24 minutes in City's 5–1 win at Wolverhampton Wanderers, his first hat-trick with the club and the third-quickest in Premier League history. Sky Sports commentator Andy Hinchcliffe described the feat as "Twenty-three minutes of footballing genius" and Jeremy Wilson, writing in The Daily Telegraph, said "De Bruyne's 'wrong-footed' hat-trick was one of the best displays in Premier League history".

De Bruyne was again given the Premier League Player of the Season award, becoming the fourth player to win the award more than once. He also went on to win Manchester City's Player of the Year award for the fourth time. As a result, he tied Richard Dunne for the most player of the year awards at the club. In addition, he ended the season as the club's top scorer in the Premier League with 15 goals, which was also his personal best record.

==== 2022–23 season ====
On 26 April 2023, De Bruyne scored a brace and provided an assist in a 4–1 win over Arsenal, which reduced their rival's lead at the league table to two points, with his team had two games in hand. On 9 May, he scored the equaliser for his club in a 1–1 away draw against Real Madrid in the Champions League semi-finals first leg, in which he managed to score in the same round for the third consecutive year.

On 10 June, he played only 36 minutes in his second Champions League final, as he suffered a hamstring injury and was replaced by Phil Foden. However, Manchester City eventually won 1–0 against Inter Milan, which completed their continental treble.

After the season, De Bruyne was nominated for UEFA Men's Player of the Year Award along with Lionel Messi and Manchester City teammate Erling Haaland.

==== 2023–24 season ====
De Bruyne started the 2023–24 season coming on as a substitute in the 2023 FA Community Shield against Arsenal on 6 August, missing a penalty as the Gunners won the shoot-out 4–1. On 11 August, he suffered a reoccurrence of a hamstring injury in the opening league game of the season against Burnley. It was later confirmed he would be out for four to five months. He made his return from injury on 7 January 2024, providing an assist in a 5–0 win over Huddersfield Town in the FA Cup third round. On 13 January, he came off the bench, scoring his first goal of the season and assisting another in a 3–2 comeback away victory over Newcastle United.

On 6 April 2024, De Bruyne scored his 100th goal for Manchester City in a 4–2 win at Crystal Palace. On 17 April, he scored a goal in a 1–1 draw against Real Madrid in the Champions League quarter-final second leg, levelling the aggregate score at 4–4; however, his club lost 4–3 in the penalty shootout. On 19 May, he achieved his 6th Premier League title with the club on the final matchday of the season.

==== 2024–25 season ====
"There’s no doubt that Kevin De Bruyne is one of the greatest players in the history of the Premier League"

— Pep Guardiola on 4 April 2025, after the announcement that De Bruyne would leave Manchester City

The club, including manager Pep Guardiola, told De Bruyne that they would not offer him a contract extension since they wanted to transition to younger players, and as De Bruyne was older and had missed a considerable number of games since his peak. On 4 April 2025, De Bruyne announced that he would leave Manchester City upon the expiration of his contract at the end of the 2024–25 season. On 17 May, De Bruyne had the opportunity to win his 20th and final trophy with Manchester City, but the club's campaign in the FA Cup ended in defeat in the final, which City lost 1–0 to Crystal Palace. In his final home game three days later, "King Kev" was extensively honored, including with a temporary mural.

With 16 major trophies, De Bruyne left Manchester City as one of the most decorated players in the club's history.

=== Napoli ===
On 12 June 2025, Serie A club Napoli announced the signing of De Bruyne on a free transfer. On 23 August, he netted his first goal on his league debut in a 2–0 away win over Sassuolo. On 13 September, he scored again during a 3–1 away win over Fiorentina. A month later, on 25 October, he sustained a hamstring injury after scoring a penalty in a 3–1 win over Inter Milan. He made his return to action as a substitute in a 2–1 victory over Torino on 6 March 2026.

== International career ==
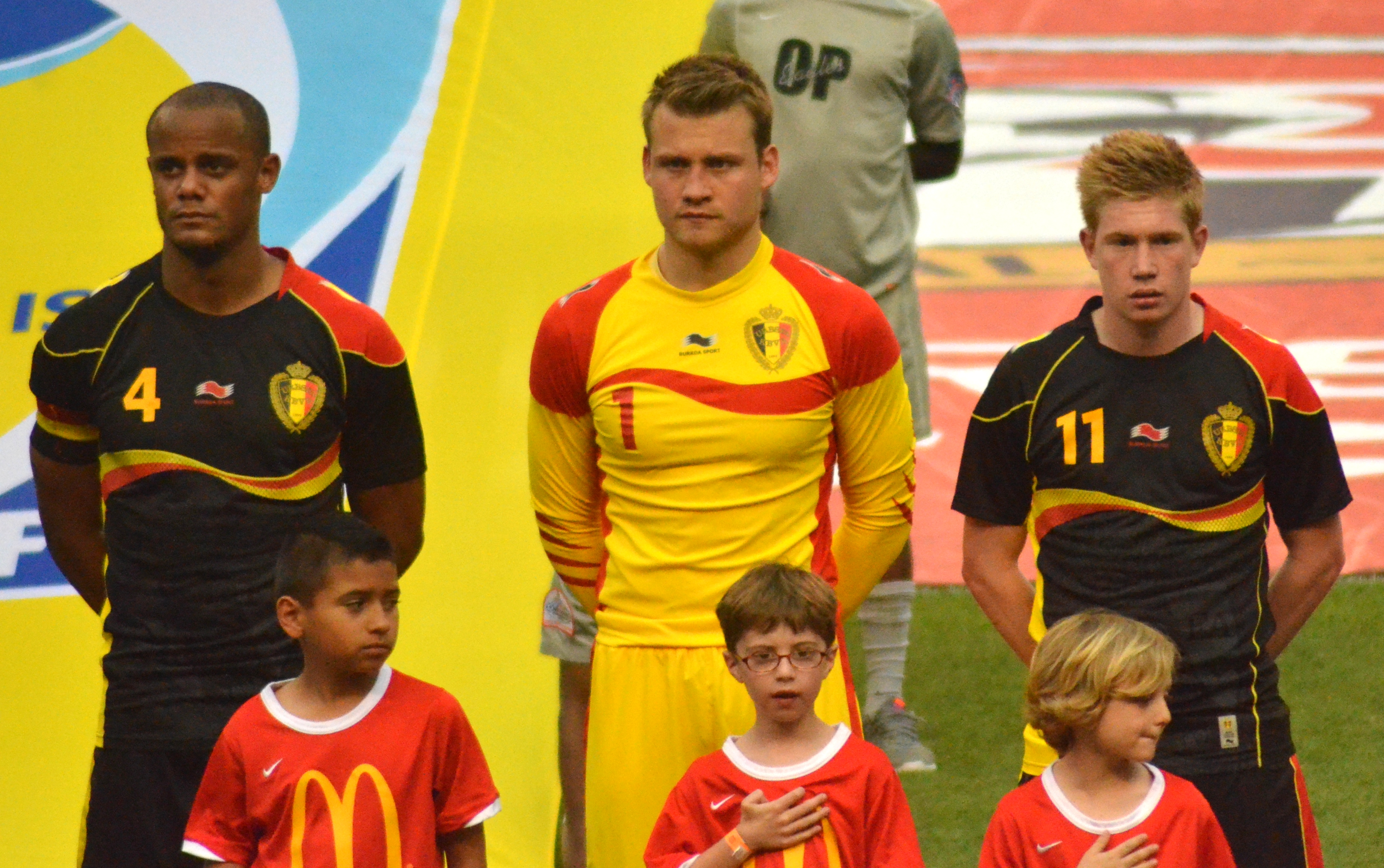
De Bruyne (right) lining up for Belgium in 2013, alongside Vincent Kompany (far left) and Simon Mignolet (middle)

De Bruyne represented Belgium at under-18, under-19, and under-21 levels. He made his senior team debut on 11 August 2010 in an international friendly match against Finland in Turku; the game ended in a 1–0 loss for Belgium. Before making his full debut for Belgium's senior side, De Bruyne was eligible to play for Burundi, his mother's birthplace.

De Bruyne became a regular member of Belgium's team during the 2014 FIFA World Cup qualification campaign, where he scored four goals as the Red Devils qualified for their first major tournament in 12 years.

=== 2014–2016: First World Cup and Euro appearances ===
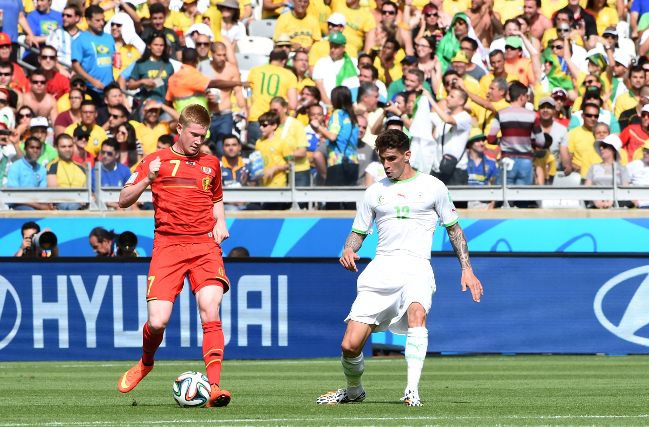
De Bruyne playing for Belgium against Algeria at the 2014 FIFA World Cup

On 13 May 2014, De Bruyne was named in Belgium's squad for the 2014 FIFA World Cup. In their first game of the tournament, against Algeria in Belo Horizonte, De Bruyne assisted Marouane Fellaini's equaliser and was named man of the match by FIFA. In the round of 16, De Bruyne scored Belgium's opening goal in the third minute of extra time as they defeated the United States 2–1. They were subsequently eliminated from the 2014 FIFA World Cup after losing 1–0 to Argentina in the quarter-finals.

On 10 October 2014, De Bruyne scored twice in a 6–0 rout of Andorra in UEFA Euro 2016 qualifying, equalling the team's record victory in a European qualifier set in 1986. On 3 September 2015, De Bruyne scored in a 3–1 win over Bosnia and Herzegovina. On 10 October 2015, De Bruyne scored in a 4–1 victory against Andorra, which secured Belgium's place at the UEFA Euro 2016 finals. Three days later, he scored in a 3–1 win over Israel, securing Belgium top-spot in the group.

On 31 May 2016, De Bruyne was selected for Belgium's final 23-man squad for UEFA Euro 2016. On 18 June 2016, De Bruyne was praised for his performance in Belgium's 3–0 win over the Republic of Ireland. On 26 June 2016, De Bruyne was voted BBC Man of the Match for his performance in a 4–0 win over Hungary in the round of 16, where he provided two assists.

=== 2016–2018: 2018 World Cup ===
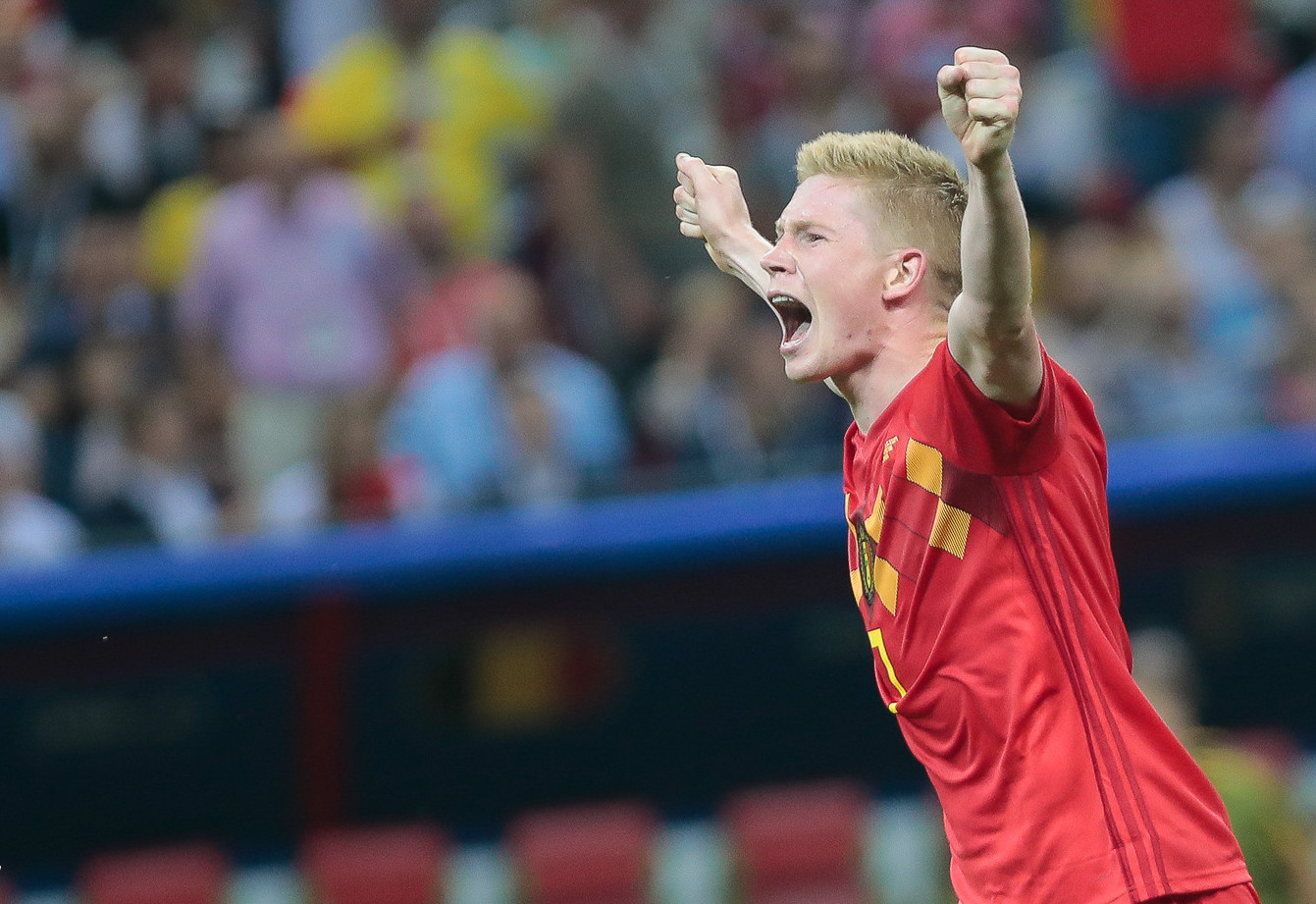
De Bruyne celebrating Belgium's 2–1 win over Brazil at the 2018 FIFA World Cup

De Bruyne was selected for Belgium's final 23-man squad for the 2018 FIFA World Cup. On 18 June, in the opening game against debutants Panama, De Bruyne provided an assist for Romelu Lukaku in an eventual 3–0 victory. On 6 July, he scored the second goal of the match in a 2–1 quarter-final victory over Brazil and was named the man of the match. In the semi-finals, Belgium were defeated 1–0 by eventual champions France. On 14 July, Belgium defeated England 2–0 in the third-place play-off.

=== 2018–2022: Euro 2020 and 2022 World Cup ===
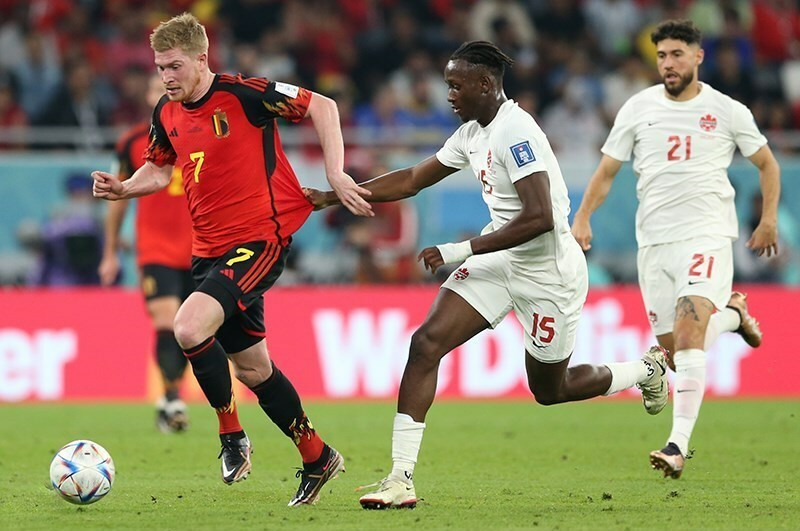
De Bruyne playing for Belgium against Canada at the 2022 FIFA World Cup

On 17 June 2021, De Bruyne scored his first and the winning goal in Belgium's second match of UEFA Euro 2020, a 2–1 victory over Denmark, having earlier in the game assisted the team's first goal. During the round of 16 clash with Portugal, De Bruyne suffered an ankle injury from a tackle from behind, by Portugal's Joao Palhinha. On 2 July Belgium manager Roberto Martinez said that De Bruyne could recover in time for the quarter-final match, later that day, despite not training all week and he was later confirmed in the starting line-up.

De Bruyne started all three games in the 2022 FIFA World Cup as Belgium were eliminated in the group stage.

=== 2022–present: Assuming the captaincy ===
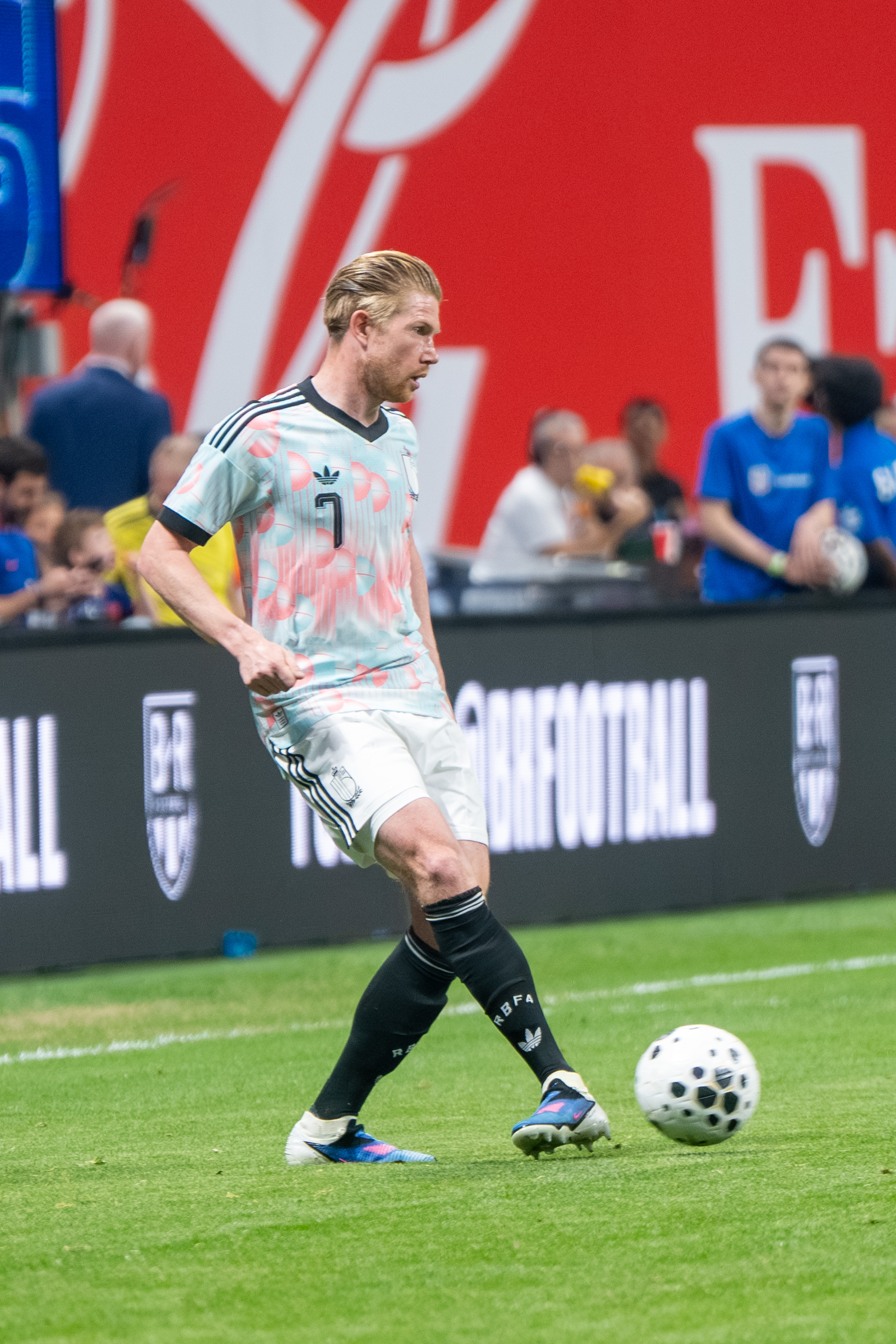
De Bruyne playing for Belgium in 2026

On 21 March 2023, De Bruyne was announced as Belgium's new captain, following the international retirement of Eden Hazard. A week later, he led Belgium to beat Germany in a friendly match for the first time since 1954, by scoring a goal and providing two assists in a 3–2 away win. On 28 May 2024, he was selected in the Belgian squad for the UEFA Euro 2024. A few days later, on 5 June, he earned his 100th international cap, in which he also scored a goal, in a 2–0 friendly victory over Montenegro prior to the tournament.

On 3 September 2025, manager Rudi Garcia—after previously rotating the captaincy around members of the squad—announced that Youri Tielemans would be Belgium's new captain, succeeding De Bruyne in the role. On 15 May 2026, he was named in the 26-man squad for the 2026 FIFA World Cup. A month later, on 26 June, he scored in a 5–1 victory over New Zealand, becoming the oldest Belgian player to score at a World Cup at 34 years and 363 days, surpassing the previous record held by Marc Wilmots. In addition, he became the first Belgian player to score in three World tournaments. Belgium were eliminated by eventual champions Spain in the quarter-finals on 10 July, following a 2–1 defeat, with De Bruyne playing a role in Charles De Ketelaere's goal, the only goal that Spain conceded throughout the tournament.

== Player profile ==
=== Style of play ===
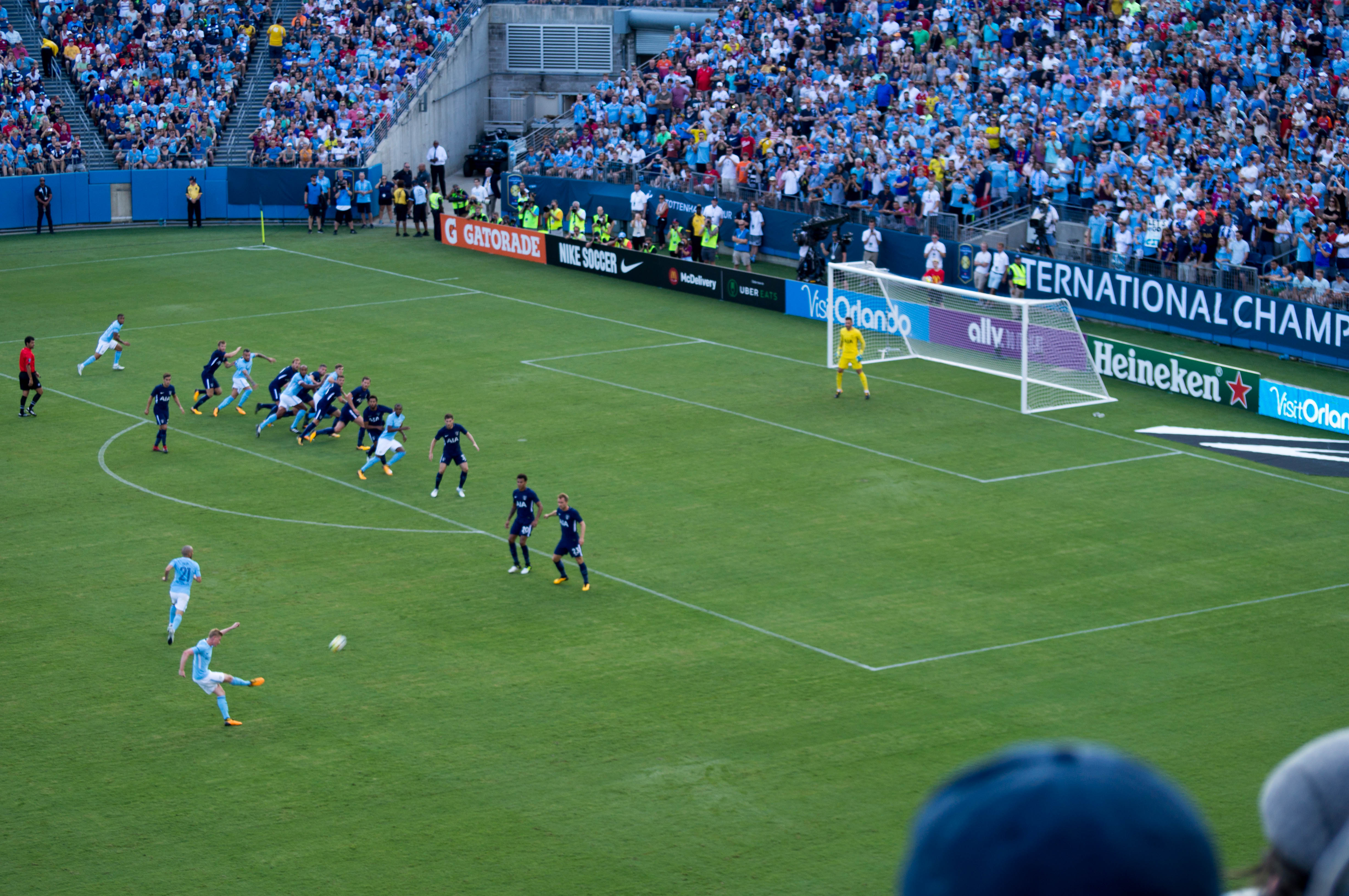
FIFA has praised De Bruyne as a "virtuoso orchestrator", highlighting his precise passing, creative playmaking, and ability to create goalscoring opportunities for his teammates.

De Bruyne primarily plays as an attacking or central midfielder, although he has also been used as a winger, second striker, and even in a deeper creative midfield position. On occasion, he has been deployed with a box-to-box role or false 9. Media and analysts frequently describe him as one of the best advanced playmakers in the modern era due to his technique, skill, athleticism, work-rate off the ball, vision, crossing accuracy, wide range of passing, and powerful long-range shooting ability with either foot.

De Bruyne has been widely praised for his assist-making ability, earning the nickname "Assist King" from the media, football pundits. He is capable of creating assists in a variety of ways. One of his trademark methods is drifting into the half-space before delivering driven diagonal crosses across the face of goal, splitting the defence and picking out teammates at the far post for tap-ins.

Although his style is not associated with significant physical strength, pace, or ability in the air, he is a quick player on the ball with good dribbling skills, while his positional sense, tactical intelligence, movement, direct style of play and ability to run at defences when in possession also enable him to take advantage of spaces in the opposition's defence and subsequently create chances and goalscoring opportunities for himself or his team-mates, making him a dangerous offensive threat on counter-attacks. In addition to his creative abilities, he is also capable of scoring goals by making late runs off the ball from behind into the penalty area and is an accurate set-piece taker.

=== Reception ===
At his peak, De Bruyne was widely regarded as one of the best players in the world, and he has often been described as a "complete" footballer. A number of sources have described him as one of the Premier League's best ever players.

De Bruyne was ranked the fourth-best footballer in the world by The Guardian in 2017 and the twelfth-best in 2019. In 2020, his Manchester City manager Pep Guardiola described him as the best midfielder in the world. As City chased The Treble in the 2022–23 season with De Bruyne playing a leading role, Jamie Redknapp said that De Bruyne was the best Premier League midfielder he had seen, ranking him above the likes of Steven Gerrard and Frank Lampard.

== Personal life ==
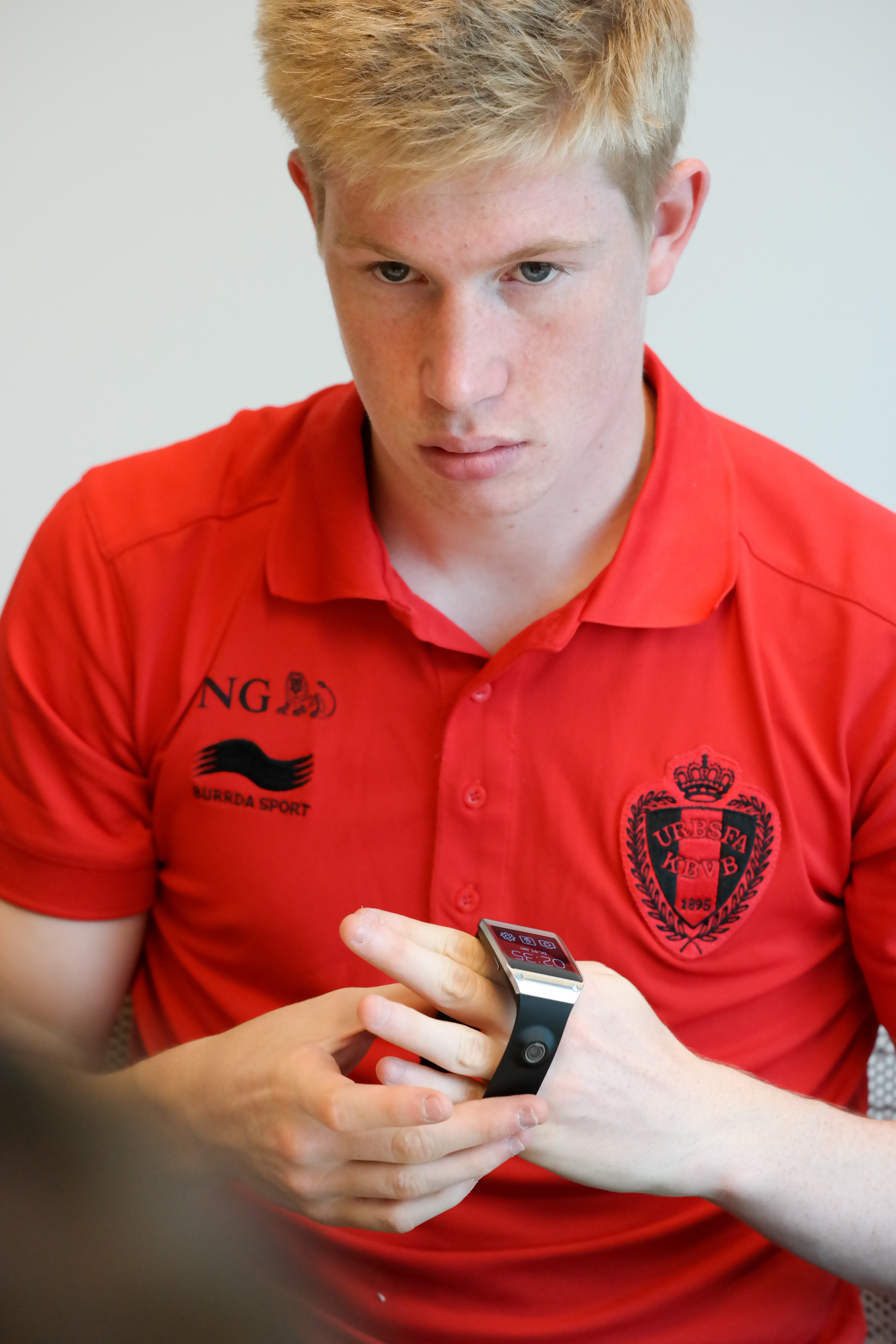
De Bruyne in 2012

=== Family and relationships ===
De Bruyne's mother is Belgian. She was born in Burundi and has also lived in the Ivory Coast. She grew up in London, after her Flemish parents moved to England for work reasons. Only when she met Kevin's father, Herwig, she returned to Belgium.

De Bruyne's parents settled in Drongen, a sub-municipality of the city of Ghent, in Flanders, the Dutch-speaking part of Belgium. Aside from Dutch, his mother tongue, De Bruyne also speaks English, French and German.

As a child, De Bruyne and his parents regularly visited his grandparents in London. At the time of his move to Chelsea in 2012, De Bruyne stated: "We used to go every year at Christmas and during school holidays. It's my second home."

De Bruyne has been in a relationship with Michèle Lacroix since 2014. The couple married in June 2017 and have three children together.

De Bruyne's autobiography, titled Keep It Simple, was published by Borgerhoff & Lamberigts in October 2014, following an incident between De Bruyne and his compatriot, footballer Thibaut Courtois, in which De Bruyne's then-girlfriend left him for Courtois. De Bruyne wrote in his autobiography, "Although I still cannot believe what Courtois has done, we continue to work together professionally."

=== Philanthropy ===
De Bruyne was an ambassador for the 2014 Special Olympics, which took place in Antwerp, and was involved in a controversial advertisement campaign via his personal Instagram account. Employing the slogan (in Dutch): "Would you still be my fan if I looked like this?", De Bruyne was depicted resembling a person with Down's syndrome. Since 2016 the Kevin De Bruyne Cup, an international youth football tournament, has been organised in Drongen, Belgium. De Bruyne was chosen by UEFA as ambassador for 2018. He presented a check worth 100,000 euros to the International Committee of the Red Cross. In 2019, De Bruyne and Romelu Lukaku handed out shoes to needy children in regional hospitals for a special campaign 'Kicks for Kids' organised by Roc Nation Sports. De Bruyne has also been involved in other charitable initiatives, including the "Common Goal" campaign, which encourages professional footballers to donate 1% of their wages to support various global social causes. In addition, he has donated money to support cancer research and has been involved in charity matches to raise money for various causes.

In 2023, De Bruyne and his wife were named as ‘godparents’ of the Ronald McDonald Children's Fund, which ensures that parents with hospitalised children will be able to stay nearby.

== Career statistics ==
=== Club ===
As of match played 21 November 2026

Appearances and goals by club, season and competition
Club	Season	League			National cup (Note: Includes Belgian Cup, DFB-Pokal, FA Cup, Coppa Italia)		League cup (Note: Includes Football League Cup/EFL Cup)		Europe		Other		Total	
Club	Season	Division	Apps	Goals	Apps	Goals	Apps	Goals	Apps	Goals	Apps	Goals	Apps	Goals
Genk	2008–09	Belgian First Division	2	0	0	0	—		—		—		2	0
Genk	2009–10	Belgian Pro League	35	3	2	0	—		2 (Note: Appearances in UEFA Europa League)	0	1 (Note: Appearance in Belgian Super Cup)	0	40	3
Genk	2010–11	Belgian Pro League	32	5	0	0	—		3	1	0	0	35	6
Genk	2011–12	Belgian Pro League	28	8	1	0	—		6 (Note: Appearances in UEFA Champions League)	0	1	0	36	8
Genk	Total		97	16	3	0	—		11	1	2	0	113	17
Chelsea	2012–13	Premier League	0	0	0	0	0	0	0	0	—		0	0
Chelsea	2013–14	Premier League	3	0	0	0	3	0	3	0	—		9	0
Chelsea	Total		3	0	0	0	3	0	3	0	0	0	9	0
Werder Bremen (loan)	2012–13	Bundesliga	33	10	1	0	—		—		—		34	10
VfL Wolfsburg	2013–14	Bundesliga	16	3	2	0	—		—		—		18	3
VfL Wolfsburg	2014–15	Bundesliga	34	10	6	1	—		11	5	—		51	16
VfL Wolfsburg	2015–16	Bundesliga	2	0	1	1	—		—		1 (Note: Appearance in DFL-Supercup)	0	4	1
VfL Wolfsburg	Total		52	13	9	2	—		11	5	1	0	73	20
Manchester City	2015–16	Premier League	25	7	1	1	5	5	10	3	—		41	16
Manchester City	2016–17	Premier League	36	6	5	0	1	0	7	1	—		49	7
Manchester City	2017–18	Premier League	37	8	3	1	4	2	8	1	—		52	12
Manchester City	2018–19	Premier League	19	2	4	2	5	2	4	0	0	0	32	6
Manchester City	2019–20	Premier League	35	13	2	1	3	0	7	2	1 (Note: Appearance in FA Community Shield)	0	48	16
Manchester City	2020–21	Premier League	25	6	3	1	4	0	8	3	—		40	10
Manchester City	2021–22	Premier League	30	15	3	1	2	1	10	2	0	0	44	19
Manchester City	2022–23	Premier League	32	7	4	1	2	0	10	2	1	0	49	10
Manchester City	2023–24	Premier League	18	4	5	0	0	0	2	2	1	0	26	6
Manchester City	2024–25	Premier League	28	4	4	2	0	0	7	0	1	0	40	6
Manchester City	Total		285	72	34	10	26	10	73	16	4	0	422	108
Napoli	2025–26	Serie A	18	5	0	0	—		3	0	0	0	21	5
Napoli	2026–27	Serie A	12	4	0	0	—		4	0	—		16	4
Napoli	Total		30	9	0	0	—		7	0	0	0	37	9
Career total			500	120	47	12	29	10	105	22	7	0	688	164

=== International ===
As of match played 15 November 2026

Appearances and goals by national team and year
National team	Year	Apps	Goals
Belgium	2010	1	0
Belgium	2011	1	0
Belgium	2012	6	1
Belgium	2013	11	3
Belgium	2014	11	4
Belgium	2015	8	4
Belgium	2016	12	1
Belgium	2017	8	0
Belgium	2018	10	2
Belgium	2019	6	4
Belgium	2020	4	1
Belgium	2021	10	3
Belgium	2022	9	2
Belgium	2023	2	1
Belgium	2024	8	4
Belgium	2025	8	6
Belgium	2026	14	5
Total		129	41

As of match played 15 November 2026
Belgium score listed first, score column indicates score after each De Bruyne goal

List of international goals scored by Kevin De Bruyne
No.	Date	Venue	Cap	Opponent	Score	Result	Competition
1	12 October 2012	Red Star Stadium, Belgrade, Serbia	6	Serbia	2–0	3–0	2014 FIFA World Cup qualification
2	22 March 2013	Arena Philip II, Skopje, Macedonia	10	Macedonia	1–0	2–0	2014 FIFA World Cup qualification
3	7 June 2013	King Baudouin Stadium, Brussels, Belgium	13	Serbia	1–0	2–1	2014 FIFA World Cup qualification
4	15 October 2013	King Baudouin Stadium, Brussels, Belgium	17	Wales	1–0	1–1	2014 FIFA World Cup qualification
5	26 May 2014	Cristal Arena, Genk, Belgium	21	Luxembourg	5–1	5–1	Friendly
6	1 July 2014	Arena Fonte Nova, Salvador, Brazil	25	United States	1–0	2–1	2014 FIFA World Cup
7	10 October 2014	King Baudouin Stadium, Brussels, Belgium	28	Andorra	1–0	6–0	UEFA Euro 2016 qualifying
8	10 October 2014	King Baudouin Stadium, Brussels, Belgium	28	Andorra	2–0	6–0	UEFA Euro 2016 qualifying
9	3 September 2015	King Baudouin Stadium, Brussels, Belgium	34	Bosnia and Herzegovina	2–1	3–1	UEFA Euro 2016 qualifying
10	10 October 2015	Estadi Nacional, Andorra la Vella, Andorra	36	Andorra	2–0	4–1	UEFA Euro 2016 qualifying
11	13 October 2015	King Baudouin Stadium, Brussels, Belgium	37	Israel	2–0	3–1	UEFA Euro 2016 qualifying
12	13 November 2015	King Baudouin Stadium, Brussels, Belgium	38	Italy	2–1	3–1	Friendly
13	28 May 2016	Stade de Genève, Lancy, Switzerland	39	Switzerland	2–1	2–1	Friendly
14	27 March 2018	King Baudouin Stadium, Brussels, Belgium	59	Saudi Arabia	4–0	4–0	Friendly
15	6 July 2018	Kazan Arena, Kazan, Russia	66	Brazil	2–0	2–1	2018 FIFA World Cup
16	11 June 2019	King Baudouin Stadium, Brussels, Belgium	70	Scotland	3–0	3–0	UEFA Euro 2020 qualifying
17	9 September 2019	Hampden Park, Glasgow, Scotland	72	Scotland	4–0	4–0	UEFA Euro 2020 qualifying
18	19 November 2019	King Baudouin Stadium, Brussels, Belgium	74	Cyprus	2–1	6–1	UEFA Euro 2020 qualifying
19	19 November 2019	King Baudouin Stadium, Brussels, Belgium	74	Cyprus	3–1	6–1	UEFA Euro 2020 qualifying
20	18 November 2020	Den Dreef, Leuven, Belgium	78	Denmark	4–2	4–2	2020–21 UEFA Nations League A
21	24 March 2021	Den Dreef, Leuven, Belgium	79	Wales	1–1	3–1	2022 FIFA World Cup qualification
22	17 June 2021	Parken Stadium, Copenhagen, Denmark	81	Denmark	2–1	2–1	UEFA Euro 2020
23	16 November 2021	Cardiff City Stadium, Cardiff, Wales	88	Wales	1–0	1–1	2022 FIFA World Cup qualification
24	8 June 2022	King Baudouin Stadium, Brussels, Belgium	90	Poland	2–1	6–1	2022–23 UEFA Nations League A
25	22 September 2022	King Baudouin Stadium, Brussels, Belgium	92	Wales	1–0	2–1	2022–23 UEFA Nations League A
26	28 March 2023	RheinEnergieStadion, Cologne, Germany	99	Germany	3–1	3–2	Friendly
27	5 June 2024	King Baudouin Stadium, Brussels, Belgium	100	Montenegro	1–0	2–0	Friendly
28	22 June 2024	RheinEnergieStadion, Cologne, Germany	103	Romania	2–0	2–0	UEFA Euro 2024
29	6 September 2024	Nagyerdei Stadion, Debrecen, Hungary	106	Israel	1–0	3–1	2024–25 UEFA Nations League A
30	6 September 2024	Nagyerdei Stadion, Debrecen, Hungary	106	Israel	3–1	3–1	2024–25 UEFA Nations League A
31	9 June 2025	King Baudouin Stadium, Brussels, Belgium	111	Wales	4–3	4–3	2026 FIFA World Cup qualification
32	4 September 2025	Rheinpark Stadion, Vaduz, Liechtenstein	112	Liechtenstein	4–0	6–0	2026 FIFA World Cup qualification
33	7 September 2025	Constant Vanden Stock Stadium, Brussels, Belgium	113	Kazakhstan	1–0	6–0	2026 FIFA World Cup qualification
34	7 September 2025	Constant Vanden Stock Stadium, Brussels, Belgium	113	Kazakhstan	5–0	6–0	2026 FIFA World Cup qualification
35	13 October 2025	Cardiff City Stadium, Cardiff, Wales	115	Wales	1–1	4–2	2026 FIFA World Cup qualification
36	13 October 2025	Cardiff City Stadium, Cardiff, Wales	115	Wales	3–1	4–2	2026 FIFA World Cup qualification
37	6 June 2026	King Baudouin Stadium, Brussels, Belgium	119	Tunisia	3–0	5–0	Friendly
38	26 June 2026	BC Place, Vancouver, Canada	122	New Zealand	3–0	5–1	2026 FIFA World Cup
39	2 October 2026	Stade Maurice Dufrasne, Liège, Belgium	127	Turkey	1–0	3–0	2026–27 UEFA Nations League A
40	2 October 2026	Stade Maurice Dufrasne, Liège, Belgium	127	Turkey	2–0	3–0	2026–27 UEFA Nations League A
41	12 November 2026	Gürsel Aksel Stadium, İzmir, Turkey	128	Turkey	1–1	2–1	2026–27 UEFA Nations League A

== Honours ==
Genk

- Belgian Pro League: 2010–11
- Belgian Cup: 2008–09
- Belgian Super Cup: 2011

VfL Wolfsburg

- DFB-Pokal: 2014–15
- DFL-Supercup: 2015

Manchester City

- Premier League: 2017–18, 2018–19, 2020–21, 2021–22, 2022–23, 2023–24
- FA Cup: 2018–19, 2022–23; runner-up: 2023–24, 2024–25
- Football League/EFL Cup: 2015–16, 2017–18, 2018–19, 2019–20, 2020–21
- FA Community Shield: 2018, 2019, 2024
- UEFA Champions League: 2022–23; runner-up: 2020–21
- UEFA Super Cup: 2023
- FIFA Club World Cup: 2023

Napoli

- Supercoppa Italiana: 2025–26

Belgium

- FIFA World Cup third place: 2018

Individual

- Bundesliga Young Player of the Year: 2012–13
- Bundesliga Player of the Year: 2014–15
- Bundesliga Team of the Year: 2014–15
- UEFA Europa League Squad of the Season: 2014–15
- Goal of the Month (Germany): October 2014
- Footballer of the Year (Germany): 2015
- France Football World XI: 2015
- Belgian Sportsman of the year: 2015
- Best Belgian Player Abroad: 2015, 2016, 2022 2023
- Manchester City Player of the Season: 2015–16, 2017–18, 2019–20, 2021–22
- IFFHS Men's World Team: 2017, 2019, 2020, 2021, 2022, 2023
- UEFA Team of the Year: 2017, 2019, 2020
- ESM Team of the Year: 2017–18, 2019–20, 2020–21, 2021–22 2022–23
- PFA Premier League Team of the Year: 2017–18, 2019–20, 2020–21, 2021–22, 2022–23
- Premier League Playmaker of the Season: 2017–18, 2019–20, 2022–23
- UEFA Champions League Squad of the Season: 2017–18, 2018–19, 2019–20, 2020–21
- FIFA World Cup Dream Team: 2018
- Premier League Goal of the Month: November 2019, July 2020
- Premier League Player of the Season: 2019–20, 2021–22
- PFA Players' Player of the Year: 2019–20, 2020–21
- Manchester City Goal of the Season: 2019–20
- UEFA Champions League Midfielder of the Season: 2019–20
- Sports Illustrated Premier League Team of the Decade: 2010–2019
- IFFHS World's Best Playmaker: 2020, 2021, 2023
- Premier League Player of the Year by Northwest Football Awards: 2020, 2022
- IFFHS UEFA Team of the Decade: 2011–2020
- RBFA 125 Years Icons Team: 2020
- FIFPRO Men's World 11: 2020, 2021, 2022, 2023, 2024
- UEFA Champions League Team of the Season: 2021–22, 2022–23
- IFFHS All Time Belgium XI
- FSA Player of the Year: 2022
- Ballon d'Or 3rd place: 2022
- Premier League Fan Team of the Season: 2023–24
- Belgian Golden Shoe Hall of Fame: 2025

== See also ==
- List of men's footballers with 100 or more international caps

== Notes ==
1. While several sources indicate that De Bruyne recorded 21 assists during the season, this number has been disputed and in 2020, the official Bundesliga website credited him with 19 assists.
2. De Bruyne caps against Romania on 14 November 2012, against Luxembourg (included his one goal) on 26 May 2014 and against Czech Republic on 5 June 2017 were counted by RBFA but not officially recognised by FIFA due to an excessive number of substitutions according to the Laws of the Game.

== Bibliography ==
- Keep It Simple (2014) (autobiography, co-authored with Raoul de Groote), Amsterdam: Borgerhoff & Lamberigts, ISBN 978-9089-31-482-6.
