= CE Sallent =

Football team

Sallent
- Full name: Centre d'Esports Sallent
- Founded: 1913
- Ground: Municipal, Sallent, Catalonia, Spain
- Capacity: 3,800
- President: Daniel Tarradellas
- Manager: Alex Sánchez
- League: Segona Catalana – Group 5
- 2024–25: Tercera Catalana – Group 8, 2nd of 16 (promoted)
Home colours	Away colours

Centre d'Esports Sallent is a football team based in Sallent, in the autonomous community of Catalonia. Founded in 1913, they play in Segona Catalana – Group 5, holding home matches at the Estadi Municipal de Sallent, which has a capacity of 3,800 spectators.

== History ==
Founded in 1913 by Valentí Morral Puig, Sallent Foot-Ball Club played in a Catalan football championship in that year. In 1920, the club was renamed Unió Esportiva Sallent.

Club Esportiu Sallent was a direct continuation of Unió in 1927, but due to the outcome of the Spanish Civil War which determined all institutions should have Spanish (not Catalan) names, the club was renamed Centro de Deportes Sallent in 1939. In 1956, Sallent achieved a first-ever promotion to Tercera División, and played four consecutive seasons in the category before suffering relegation.

In 1980, the club returned to the previous name of "Club Esportiu", and was renamed Centre d'Esports Sallent in 1990.

=== Club background ===
- Sallent Foot-Ball Club (1913–1920)
- Unió Esportiva Sallent (1920–1927)
- Club Esportiu Sallent (1927–1939; 1980–1990)
- Centre d'Esports Sallent (1990–present)

== Season to season ==
Season	Tier	Division	Place	Copa del Rey
1943–44	6	2ª Reg.	4th	
1944–45	7	2ª Reg.	1st	
1945–46	6	2ª Reg. P.	1st	
1946–47	6	3ª Reg.	7th	
1947–48	6	2ª Reg.	3rd	
1948–49	5	1ª Reg. B	5th	
1949–50	5	1ª Reg. B	9th	
1950–51	5	1ª Reg. B	1st	
1951–52	5	1ª Reg. B	3rd	
1952–53	5	1ª Reg. B	8th	
1953–54	5	2ª Reg.	3rd	
1954–55	4	1ª Reg.	10th	
1955–56	4	1ª Reg.	1st	
1956–57	3	3ª	8th	
1957–58	3	3ª	9th	
1958–59	3	3ª	9th	
1959–60	3	3ª	15th	
1960–61	4	1ª Reg.	12th	
1961–62	4	1ª Reg.	11th	
1962–63	4	1ª Reg.	16th	

Season	Tier	Division	Place	Copa del Rey
1963–64	5	2ª Reg.	8th	
1964–65	5	2ª Reg.	1st	
1965–66	4	1ª Reg.	20th	
1966–67	4	1ª Reg.	21st	
1967–68	5	2ª Reg.	7th	
1968–69	5	1ª Reg.	2nd	
1969–70	5	1ª Reg.	3rd	
1970–71	5	1ª Reg.	6th	
1971–72	5	1ª Reg.	2nd	
1972–73	5	1ª Reg.	20th	
1973–74	6	2ª Reg.	1st	
1974–75	5	1ª Reg.	13th	
1975–76	5	1ª Reg.	15th	
1976–77	6	2ª Reg.	13th	
1977–78	7	2ª Reg.	18th	
1978–79	8	3ª Reg.	2nd	
1979–80	8	3ª Reg.	1st	
1980–81	7	2ª Reg.	1st	
1981–82	6	1ª Reg.	9th	
1982–83	6	1ª Reg.	9th	

Season	Tier	Division	Place	Copa del Rey
1983–84	6	1ª Reg.	12th	
1984–85	6	1ª Reg.	3rd	
1985–86	6	1ª Reg.	5th	
1986–87	6	1ª Reg.	4th	
1987–88	6	1ª Reg.	2nd	
1988–89	6	1ª Reg.	3rd	
1989–90	6	1ª Reg.	3rd	
1990–91	6	1ª Reg.	5th	
1991–92	7	1ª Terr.	4th	
1992–93	7	1ª Terr.	10th	
1993–94	7	1ª Terr.	11th	
1994–95	7	1ª Terr.	8th	
1995–96	7	1ª Terr.	13th	
1996–97	7	1ª Terr.	13th	
1997–98	7	1ª Terr.	16th	
1998–99	8	2ª Terr.	1st	
1999–2000	7	1ª Terr.	12th	
2000–01	7	1ª Terr.	9th	
2001–02	7	1ª Terr.	5th	
2002–03	7	1ª Terr.	5th	

Season	Tier	Division	Place	Copa del Rey
2003–04	7	1ª Terr.	2nd	
2004–05	6	Pref. Terr.	18th	
2005–06	7	1ª Terr.	15th	
2006–07	8	2ª Terr.	15th	
2007–08	8	2ª Terr.	10th	
2008–09	8	2ª Terr.	3rd	
2009–10	8	2ª Terr.	1st	
2010–11	7	1ª Terr.	8th	
2011–12	6	2ª Cat.	6th	
2012–13	6	2ª Cat.	14th	
2012–13	7	3ª Cat.	1st	
2014–15	6	2ª Cat.	4th	
2015–16	6	2ª Cat.	6th	
2016–17	6	2ª Cat.	12th	
2017–18	6	2ª Cat.	11th	
2018–19	6	2ª Cat.	12th	
2019–20	6	2ª Cat.	16th	
2020–21	6	2ª Cat.	6th	
2021–22	7	2ª Cat.	13th	
2022–23	8	3ª Cat.	13th	

Season	Tier	Division	Place	Copa del Rey
2023–24	9	3ª Cat.	11th	
2024–25	9	3ª Cat.	2nd	
2025–26	8	2ª Cat.		

- 4 seasons in Tercera División
