= Sallent =

- Municipality
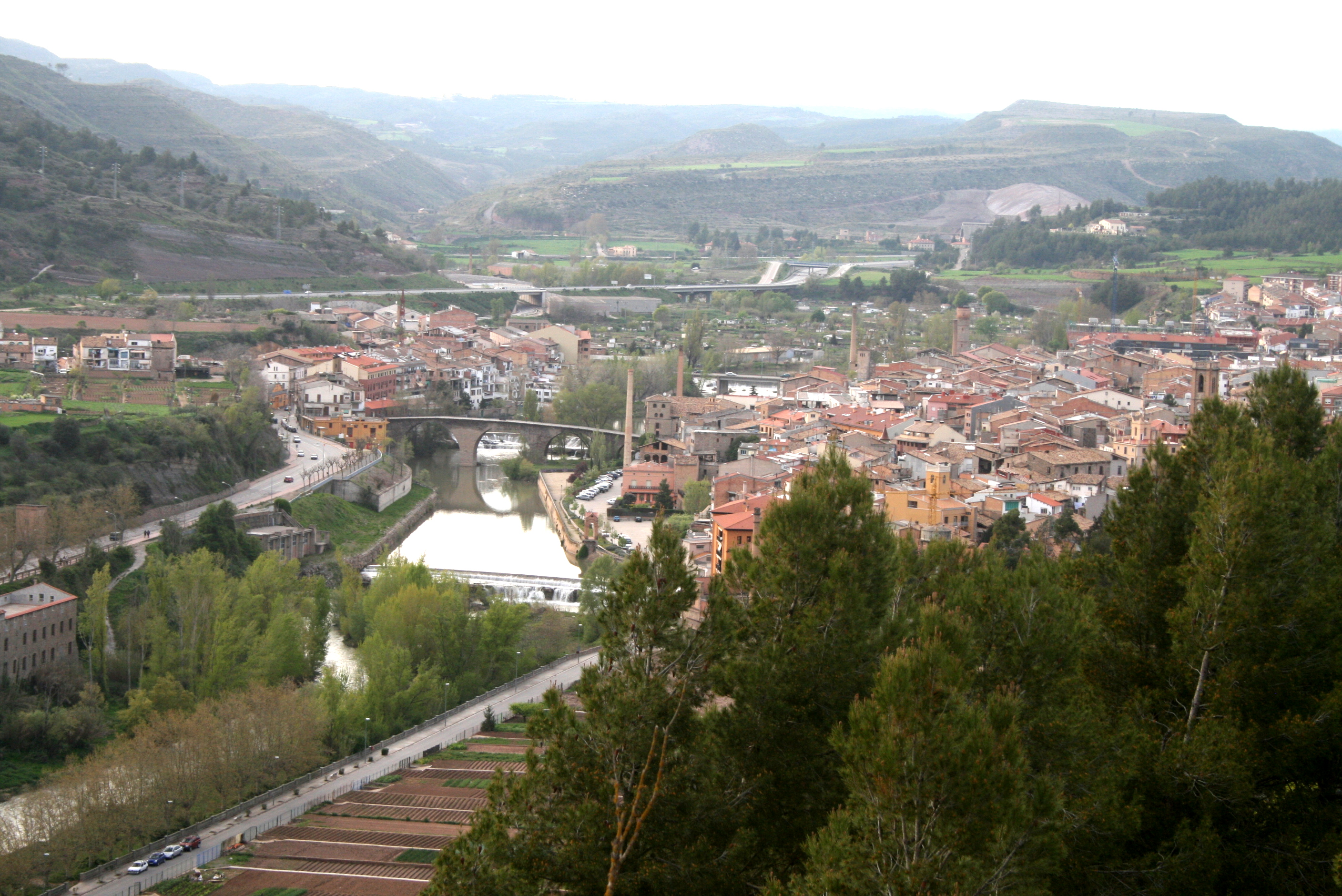
- View of Sallent

- Coat of arms

- Location within Spain Location within Catalonia Location within Province of Barcelona
- Coordinates: 41°49′27.0″N 1°53′40.2″E
- Country: Spain
- Community: Catalonia
- Province: Barcelona
- Comarca: Bages

Government
  - Mayor: Oriol Ribalta (2019)

Area
  - Total: 65.2 km^{2} (25.2 sq mi)
- Elevation: 278 m (912 ft)

Population (2025-01-01)
  - Total: 7,030
  - Density: 108/km^{2} (279/sq mi)
- Demonym: Sallentins
- Website: Official website

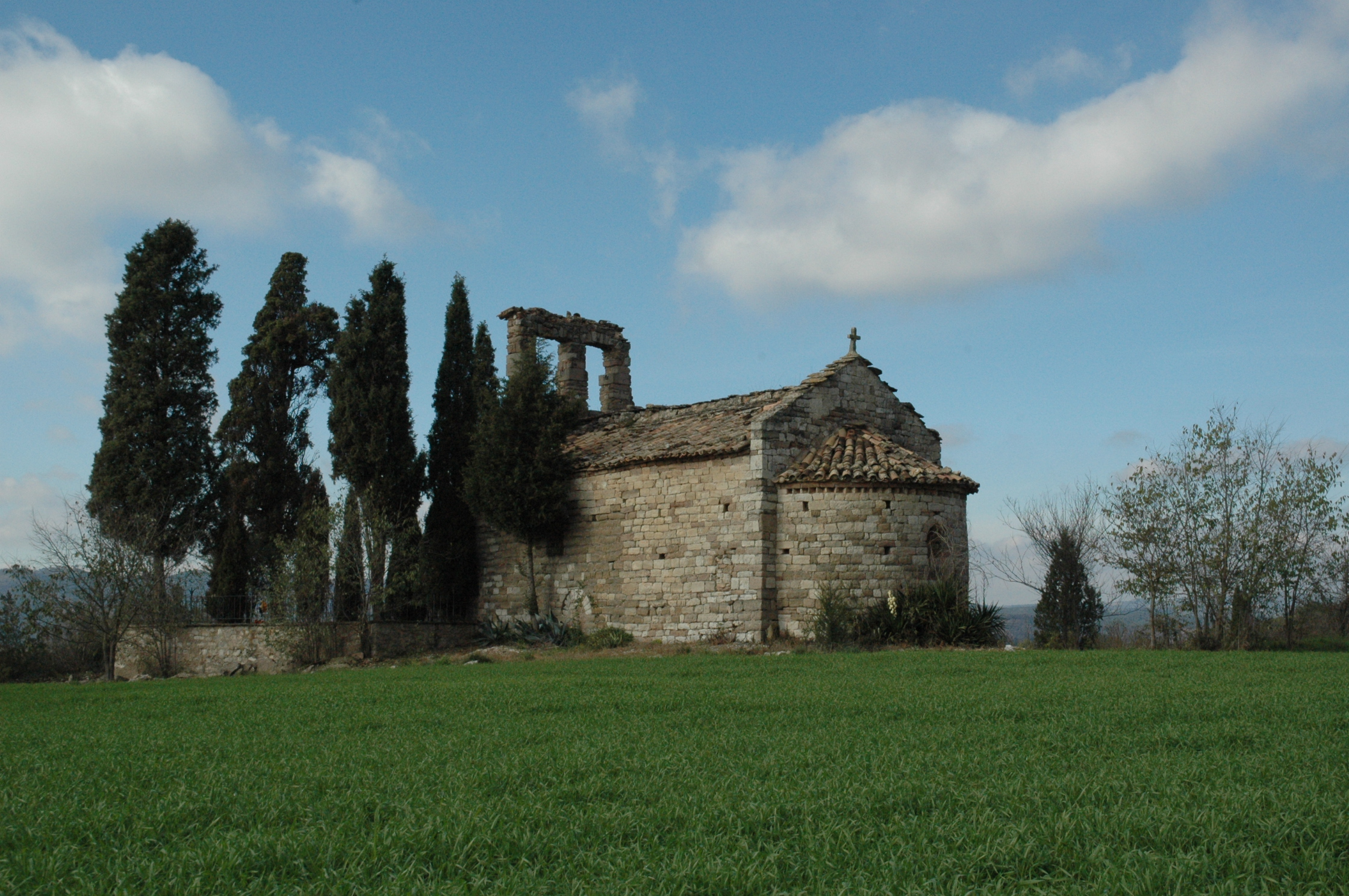
Sant Miquel de Serra-sanç in Sallent, Bages.

Sallent de Llobregat (Catalan pronunciation: [səˈʎen də ʎuβɾəˈɣat]) or Sallent is a municipality in the comarca of Bages, Province of Barcelona, in the Autonomous Community of Catalonia, Spain. The river Llobregat divides the municipality into two halves. Its main resources are mining and industry. It was the birthplace of Saint Anthony Mary Claret (1807–1870) and goalkeeper Joan Garcia (2001).

== Demography ==
According to Spanish census data, this is the population of Sallent in recent years.

1981	1991	2001	2011	2021
8,213	7,686	7,004	6,866	6,713
