= Albert de Quintana =

Albert de Quintana may refer to:

- Albert de Quintana y Combis (1834–1907), Spanish landowner
- Albert de Quintana de León (1890–1932), Spanish lawyer and politician

== See also ==
- Alberto Quintana
