= 2013–14 Segunda División =

83rd season of the second-tier football league in Spain

Segunda División
- Season: 2013–2014
- Champions: Eibar
- Promoted: Eibar; Deportivo La Coruña; Córdoba
- Relegated: Murcia; RM Castilla; Jaén; Hércules
- Matches: 468
- Goals: 1,085 (2.32 per match)
- Top goalscorer: (Spain) Borja Viguera (25 goals)
- Biggest home win: Eibar 6–0 RM Castilla (17 November 2013); Girona 6–0 Lugo (16 February 2014)
- Biggest away win: Tenerife 0–4 Alcorcón (18 January 2014); Sabadell 0–4 Alavés (8 February 2014)
- Highest scoring: 6 goals (17 games)
- Highest attendance: 33,639; Deportivo 1–0 Jaén (31 May 2014)
- Lowest attendance: 1,136; RM Castilla 3–2 Girona (4 December 2013)
- Average attendance: 7,787

The 2013–14 Segunda División season (known as the Liga Adelante for sponsorship reasons) was the 83rd since its establishment. The season started on 17 August 2013 and the league phase of 42 rounds ended on 8 June 2014. The entire season ended on 22 June 2014 with the promotion play-off finals.

== Teams ==
=== Promotion and relegation (pre-season) ===
A total of 22 teams contested the league, including 15 sides from the 2012–13 season, four promoted from the 2012–13 Segunda División B and three relegated from the 2012–13 La Liga.

RCD Mallorca, Deportivo de La Coruña and Real Zaragoza were the teams relegated from La Liga the previous season. Mallorca was relegated after sixteen years in La Liga, the longest period in its history and ending their golden era, Zaragoza returned to the Segunda División after a four-year tenure in La Liga, while Deportivo de La Coruña made an immediate return to the Segunda División after being promoted the previous year. All three teams were relegated in the last matchday. Elche CF was promoted the previous season to La Liga after 14 consecutive seasons in the Segunda División. Villarreal made an immediate return to La Liga after a win over Almería in the decisive match of the last matchday where the winner would be directly promoted to La Liga. Almería was promoted on 22 June 2013 as winner of play-off games after two years of absence in La Liga.

The teams which had been relegated from the Segunda División the previous season were Guadalajara, Racing Santander, Huesca and Xerez. Xerez was relegated after twelve years in the division some weeks before the end of season. On 2 June 2013, after the penultimate matchday, Racing, Huesca and Murcia were relegated after Mirandés' win, however on 4 June 2013 LaLiga relegated Guadalajara and the three teams had their last opportunity to stay in Segunda División in the last matchday. Finally, Huesca was relegated after five years in the second level, while Racing de Santander returned to the third level after twenty years and nineteen of them in La Liga. Murcia was the team saved from the relegation after the administrative relegation of Guadalajara.

The four teams relegated were replaced by four Segunda División B teams: Deportivo Alavés (group 2 champions and overall champions) and CD Tenerife (group 1 champions and overall runners-up), both from the champions play-offs and two from the third round play-offs: Eibar and Jaén. Alavés and Tenerife returned to the second level respectively after 4 and 2 years, while Eibar and Jaén returned to the second level respectively after 4 and 11 years.

==== Guadalajara case ====
Guadalajara was relegated to Segunda División B administratively after irregularities detected in the capital increase made the previous summer for conversion to a Sociedad Anónima Deportiva. Murcia remained in Segunda after the relegation administratively of Guadalajara, however RFEF didn't recognize the unilateral sanction by LFP and the relegated or saved team was disputed between Guadalajara and Murcia until Spanish sports jurisdictional body, the CEDD (part of CSD), would make a resolution. CEDD ruled refusing the precautionary suspension of Guadalajara relegation, whereby Murcia remained in Segunda.

=== Stadia and locations ===
Location of teams in 2013–14 Segunda División
Canary Islands

Team	Home city	Stadium	Capacity
Alavés	Vitoria	Mendizorroza	19,840
Alcorcón	Alcorcón	Santo Domingo	5,880
Barcelona B	Barcelona	Mini Estadi	15,276
Córdoba	Córdoba	El Arcángel	18,280
Deportivo La Coruña	A Coruña	Riazor	34,600
Eibar	Eibar	Ipurua	5,250
Girona	Girona	Estadi Municipal Montilivi	9,286
Hércules	Alicante	José Rico Pérez	30,000
Jaén	Jaén	Estadio de La Victoria	12,569
Las Palmas	Las Palmas de Gran Canaria	Estadio Gran Canaria	31,250
Lugo	Lugo	Anxo Carro	7,840
Mallorca	Palma	Iberostar Estadio	23,142
Mirandés	Miranda de Ebro	Municipal de Anduva	6,000
Murcia	Murcia	Nueva Condomina	31,179
Numancia	Soria	Estadio Los Pajaritos	9,025
Ponferradina	Ponferrada	El Toralín	8,800
Real Madrid Castilla	Madrid	Alfredo Di Stéfano	6,000
Recreativo	Huelva	Nuevo Colombino	21,670
Sabadell	Sabadell	Nova Creu Alta	11,981
Sporting de Gijón	Gijón	El Molinón	30,000
Tenerife	Santa Cruz de Tenerife	Heliodoro Rodríguez López	24,000
Zaragoza	Zaragoza	La Romareda	34,596

=== Personnel and sponsorship ===
Team	Chairman	Head coach	Captain	Kit manufacturer	Shirt sponsor
Alavés	(Spain) Avelino Fernández	(Spain) Alberto López		Hummel	Euskaltel
Alcorcón	(Spain) Julián Villena	(Spain) José Bordalás	(Spain) Rubén Sanz	Erreà	
Barcelona B	(Spain) Josep Maria Bartomeu	(Spain) Eusebio Sacristán	(Spain) Ilie Sánchez	Nike	Qatar Airways, Unicef
Córdoba	(Spain) Carlos González	(Spain) Albert Ferrer	(Spain) Abel Gómez	Nike	RD Impagos
Deportivo La Coruña	(Spain) Constantino Fernández Pico	(Spain) Fernando Vázquez	(Spain) Manuel Pablo	Lotto	Estrella Galicia
Eibar	(Spain) Alex Aranzabal	(Spain) Gaizka Garitano	(Spain)	Astore	Hierros Servando
Girona	(Spain) Pablo Machín	(Spain) Ricardo Rodríguez		Kedeké	Tamesol
Hércules	(Spain) Carlos Parodi	(Serbia) Slaviša Jokanović	(Spain) Paco Peña	Nike	Comunitat Valenciana
Jaén	(Spain) Rafael Teruel	(Spain) Manolo Herrero	(Spain) Fran Machado	M2A	Jaén Paraíso Interior
Las Palmas	(Spain) Miguel Ángel Ramírez	(Spain) Josico	(Spain) David García	Hummel	Gran Canaria
Lugo	(Spain) José Bouso	(Spain) Quique Setién	(Spain) Manu	CDLU	Estrella Galicia
Mallorca	(Spain) Lorenzo Serra Ferrer	(Spain) Javier Olaizola	(Portugal) Nunes	Macron	Riviera Maya
Mirandés	(Spain) Ramiro Revuelta	(Spain) Carlos Terrazas	(Spain) Iván Agustín	Erreà	Province of Burgos
Murcia	(Spain) Jesús Samper	(Spain) Julio Velázquez	(Spain) Richi	Joma	
Numancia	(Spain) Francisco Rubio	(Spain) Juan Antonio Anquela	(Spain) Txomin Nagore	Erreà	Solarig
Ponferradina	(Spain) José Fernández Nieto	(Spain) Claudio Barragán	(Spain) Máyor	Adidas	Bio3
Real Madrid Castilla	(Spain) Nicolás Martín-Sanz	(Spain) José Manuel Díaz	(Spain) Jorge Casado	Adidas	Fly Emirates
Recreativo	(Spain) Pablo Comas-Mata	(Spain) Sergi Barjuán	(Spain) David Córcoles	Adidas	Cajasol
Sabadell	(Spain) Joan Soteras	(Spain) Miquel Olmo	(Spain) Agustín Fernández	Kelme	
Sporting de Gijón	(Spain) Antonio Veiga	(Spain) Abelardo Fernández	(Spain) Iván Hernández	Kappa	Gijón, Ternera Asturiana, Huawei, Telecable and Air Europa
Tenerife	(Spain) Miguel Concepción	(Spain) Álvaro Cervera	(Spain) Suso	Hummel	Tenerife
Zaragoza	(Spain) Fernando Molinos	(Spain) Víctor Muñoz	(Spain) Javier Paredes	Mercury	

=== Managerial changes ===
Team	Outgoing manager	Manner of departure	Date of vacancy	Replaced by	Date of appointment	Position in table
Mallorca	(Spain) Gregorio Manzano	End of contract	5 June 2013	(Spain) José Luis Oltra	9 June 2013	18th (in La Liga)
Murcia	(Spain) Onésimo Sánchez	End of contract	11 June 2013	(Spain) Julio Velázquez	10 July 2013	19th (in 2012–13)
Zaragoza	(Spain) Manolo Jiménez	Mutual consent	18 June 2013	(Spain) Paco Herrera	20 June 2013	20th (in La Liga)
Córdoba	(Argentina) Juan Eduardo Esnáider	Sacked	11 June 2013	(Spain) Pablo Villa	27 June 2013	14th (in 2012–13)
Mirandés	(Spain) Carlos Pouso	End of contract	29 June 2013	(Spain) Gonzalo Arconada	30 June 2013	15th (in 2012–13)
Sabadell	(Spain) Lluís Carreras	End of contract	9 June 2013	(Spain) Javi Salamero	3 July 2013	16th (in 2012–13)
Alcorcón	(Spain) José Bordalás	End of contract	19 June 2013	(Spain) Miguel Álvarez	3 July 2013	5th (in 2012–13)
Girona	(Spain) Rubi	End of contract	26 June 2013	(Spain) Ricardo Rodríguez	3 July 2013	4th (in 2012–13)
Real Madrid Castilla	(Spain) Alberto Toril	Sacked	19 November 2013	(Spain) José Manuel Díaz	19 November 2013	22nd
Sabadell	(Spain) Javi Salamero	Sacked	28 November 2013	(Spain) Miquel Olmo (as caretaker)	28 November 2013	20th
Alavés	(Spain) Natxo González	Sacked	3 December 2013	(Spain) Juan Carlos Mandiá	3 December 2013	21st
Mirandés	(Spain) Gonzalo Arconada	Sacked	17 December 2013	(Spain) Carlos Terrazas		16th
Girona	(Spain) Ricardo Rodríguez	Sacked	18 December 2013	(Spain) Javi López	18 December 2013	18th
Alcorcón	(Spain) Miguel Álvarez	Sacked	5 February 2014	(Spain) José Bordalás	5 February 2014	17th
Córdoba	(Spain) Pablo Villa	Sacked		(Spain) Albert Ferrer		12th
Mallorca	(Spain) José Luis Oltra	Sacked	24 February 2014	(Spain) Lluís Carreras	24 February 2014	11th
Girona	(Spain) Javi López	Sacked	9 March 2014	(Spain) Pablo Machín	9 March 2014	22nd
Zaragoza	(Spain) Paco Herrera	Sacked	17 March 2014	(Spain) Víctor Muñoz	18 March 2014	12th
Alavés	(Spain) Juan Carlos Mandiá	Sacked	24 March 2014	(Spain) Alberto López	24 March 2014	21st
Sporting de Gijón	(Spain) José Ramón Sandoval	Sacked	4 May 2014	(Spain) Abelardo	4 May 2014	7th
Hércules	(Spain) Quique Hernández	Sacked	5 May 2014	(Serbia) Slaviša Jokanović	5 May 2014	22nd
Mallorca	(Spain) Lluís Carreras	Sacked	20 May 2014	(Spain) Javier Olaizola	20 May 2014	18th
Las Palmas	(Spain) Sergio Lobera	Sacked	26 May 2014	(Spain) Josico	26 May 2014	3rd

== League table ==
Pos	Team	Pld	W	D	L	GF	GA	GD	Pts	Promotion, qualification or relegation
1	Eibar (C, P)	42	19	14	9	49	28	+21	71	Promotion to La Liga
2	Deportivo La Coruña (P)	42	19	12	11	48	36	+12	69	Promotion to La Liga
3	Barcelona B (Note: Barcelona B could not participate in the play-offs as they are Barcelona's reserve team, so the seventh positioned team qualified for the play-offs.)	42	20	6	16	60	46	+14	66	
4	Murcia (R)	42	16	17	9	55	44	+11	65	Qualification to the promotion play offs and relegation to Segunda División B (Note: Murcia failed to obtain a professional license and were relegated to the Segunda División B by the LFP while Mirandés was re-instated.)
5	Sporting Gijón	42	16	16	10	63	51	+12	64	Qualification to promotion play-offs
6	Las Palmas	42	18	9	15	51	50	+1	63	Qualification to promotion play-offs
7	Córdoba (O, P)	42	16	13	13	47	43	+4	61 (Note: COR 2–0 REC; REC 1–1 COR)	Qualification to promotion play-offs
8	Recreativo	42	16	13	13	53	53	0	61	
9	Alcorcón	42	16	11	15	46	40	+6	59 (Note: SAB 1–2 ALC; ALC 3–1 SAB)	
10	Sabadell	42	17	8	17	52	58	−6	59	
11	Tenerife	42	15	9	18	46	49	−3	54 (Note: TEN: 7 pts → TEN 0–1 LUGO; LUGO: 7 pts → LUGO 1–3 TEN; NUM: 2 pts)	
12	Lugo	42	14	12	16	41	48	−7	54	
13	Numancia	42	11	21	10	42	41	+1	54	
14	Zaragoza	42	13	14	15	49	53	−4	53	
15	Girona	42	12	15	15	52	50	+2	51 (Note: GIR: 9 pts → GIR 1–1 PON; PON: 9 pts → PON 1–2 GIR; MAL: 8 pts; ALA: 5 pts)	
16	Ponferradina	42	13	12	17	46	49	−3	51	
17	Mallorca	42	12	15	15	46	57	−11	51	
18	Alavés	42	13	12	17	57	57	0	51	
19	Mirandés	42	13	11	18	38	56	−18	50	Spared from relegation
20	Real Madrid Castilla (R)	42	13	10	19	49	56	−7	49	Relegation to Segunda División B
21	Jaén (R)	42	12	12	18	43	49	−6	48	Relegation to Segunda División B
22	Hércules (R)	42	11	12	19	45	62	−17	45	Relegation to Segunda División B

Source: LFP - Liga Adelante
Rules for classification: 1st points; 2nd head-to-head points; 3rd head-to-head goal difference; 4th goal difference; 5th number of goals scored.
(C) Champions; (O) Play-off winners; (P) Promoted; (R) Relegated

=== Positions by round ===
The table lists the positions of teams after completion of each round.

Team ╲ Round	1	2	3	4	5	6	7	8	9	10	11	12	13	14	15	16	17	18	19	20	21	22	23	24	25	26	27	28	29	30	31	32	33	34	35	36	37	38	39	40	41	42
Eibar	3	13	14	10	12	15	17	18	18	16	9	7	11	6	4	6	6	4	4	3	3	3	3	3	1	1	1	1	1	1	1	1	2	2	2	2	2	2	2	1	1	1
Deportivo	8	12	6	12	14	13	8	9	5	4	6	3	2	2	1	2	1	1	1	1	1	2	1	1	2	2	2	2	2	2	2	2	1	1	1	1	1	1	1	2	2	2
Barcelona B	16	11	7	7	5	8	12	15	17	15	18	19	20	18	18	18	16	17	19	18	15	15	17	13	10	12	14	12	9	8	6	6	6	5	3	3	3	5	3	5	3	3
Murcia	14	9	10	4	2	3	3	4	2	2	3	5	6	9	9	10	12	6	8	11	11	12	12	15	13	8	7	11	8	6	9	8	8	7	7	8	5	4	5	6	4	4
Sporting	6	6	3	3	1	4	4	2	3	6	8	11	5	8	6	5	3	3	2	2	2	1	2	2	3	4	4	4	4	4	3	4	5	8	8	6	7	6	6	4	5	5
Las Palmas	17	18	17	16	15	12	15	10	12	11	5	4	8	5	3	4	5	9	5	5	7	4	6	8	7	9	6	6	6	5	4	3	4	3	5	5	4	3	4	3	6	6
Córdoba	7	2	5	8	6	5	2	5	8	5	4	6	7	4	8	9	13	8	12	7	8	7	8	6	11	13	13	9	12	13	15	16	15	11	10	9	8	9	7	7	7	7
Recreativo	2	5	13	9	3	1	1	1	1	1	1	1	1	1	2	1	2	2	3	4	5	6	5	4	4	3	3	3	3	3	5	5	3	4	6	7	9	10	8	8	8	8
Alcorcón	9	3	1	2	8	11	7	7	10	14	15	17	16	13	14	14	11	14	13	16	19	13	16	17	19	16	18	20	20	20	19	20	18	18	16	16	13	11	11	10	10	9
Sabadell	1	8	15	15	11	16	10	12	15	18	19	15	17	20	20	19	19	19	15	13	9	11	11	14	16	17	19	15	13	17	12	10	12	9	12	10	10	8	9	9	9	10
Tenerife	21	19	19	21	21	21	20	21	21	20	20	20	18	17	17	17	14	15	17	15	16	19	13	11	14	14	9	8	7	9	7	7	7	6	4	4	6	7	10	11	11	11
Lugo	12	16	11	6	10	6	5	8	4	3	2	2	3	3	5	3	4	7	10	12	14	10	9	7	5	7	10	10	10	11	11	11	9	10	9	11	11	13	14	14	14	12
Numancia	13	4	8	11	13	10	14	14	11	10	12	9	4	7	7	8	9	5	6	9	6	9	10	10	9	5	5	5	5	7	8	12	13	12	14	14	16	16	13	12	12	13
Zaragoza	10	14	18	20	17	14	16	11	7	8	7	13	15	16	15	11	7	10	11	6	4	5	4	5	6	6	8	7	11	12	14	15	14	13	11	13	15	12	12	13	13	14
Ponferradina	20	10	12	13	9	2	9	3	6	9	11	8	9	11	13	13	10	13	9	10	12	14	14	12	12	15	16	16	19	19	20	19	20	16	17	15	14	15	16	15	15	15
Girona	8	1	2	5	4	7	11	13	16	12	13	14	10	12	16	16	18	18	20	21	20	20	21	22	21	20	21	22	22	22	22	22	21	21	22	22	19	19	21	20	19	16
Mallorca	22	22	22	19	18	17	13	16	13	7	10	12	13	15	11	7	8	11	7	8	10	8	7	9	8	10	11	13	15	10	10	9	10	14	15	17	18	18	18	18	16	17
Alavés	19	17	16	17	19	18	18	17	14	17	17	16	19	19	19	21	21	21	22	20	21	21	20	19	17	19	22	19	21	21	21	21	22	22	21	21	21	21	20	21	20	18
Mirandés	4	7	4	1	7	9	6	6	9	13	14	10	12	14	10	12	15	16	18	19	18	18	19	21	18	22	20	21	18	16	17	13	11	15	13	12	12	14	15	16	17	19
R.M.Castilla	18	20	20	22	22	22	22	22	22	22	22	22	22	22	22	22	22	22	21	22	22	22	22	20	22	21	17	17	17	15	18	18	19	19	19	19	20	20	19	19	18	20
Jaén	15	21	21	18	20	20	21	19	19	19	16	18	14	10	12	15	17	12	14	17	13	16	15	16	15	11	12	14	16	14	13	14	17	20	20	18	17	17	17	17	21	21
Hércules	11	15	9	14	16	19	19	20	20	21	21	21	21	21	21	20	20	20	16	14	17	17	18	18	20	18	15	18	14	18	16	17	16	17	18	20	22	22	22	22	22	22

Leader
2014–15 La Liga
2014 Promotion Play-off
Relegation to 2014–15 Segunda División B

Source: LFP Liga AdelanteSoccerway Summary SEGUNDA DIVISIÓN

== Results ==
The draw of the matchdays calendar was on 9 July 2013.

Home \ Away	ALV	ALC	BAR	CÓR	DCO	EIB	GIR	HÉR	JAÉ	LPA	LUG	MLL	MIR	MUR	NUM	PNF	RMC	REC	SAB	RSG	TEN	ZAR
Alavés	—	1–0	2–3	1–1	1–1	0–2	1–1	3–1	1–2	1–1	2–1	1–0	0–2	0–1	3–1	2–2	2–2	3–3	1–1	3–0	2–2	2–2
Alcorcón	2–0	—	2–2	0–0	1–2	0–0	0–0	0–2	0–0	2–0	1–0	1–1	2–0	0–0	0–1	0–1	0–2	3–0	3–1	1–0	1–0	1–0
Barcelona B	2–1	4–3	—	0–1	0–1	0–2	2–1	5–0	0–3	1–2	2–1	0–1	1–1	4–0	3–0	1–0	2–0	0–1	2–0	2–2	2–0	1–0
Córdoba	1–1	3–1	1–2	—	0–1	0–2	2–0	4–2	0–0	0–1	1–1	0–0	1–1	1–1	3–1	1–0	2–0	2–0	1–0	2–2	1–0	1–2
Deportivo La Coruña	2–1	1–0	0–0	0–1	—	1–1	0–0	3–2	1–0	1–2	0–0	3–1	0–0	0–1	3–3	0–3	2–0	2–0	2–1	1–1	1–1	1–1
Eibar	1–0	0–0	0–0	1–0	2–1	—	0–3	1–1	2–0	1–0	1–0	0–1	1–0	0–0	1–2	0–0	6–0	0–0	1–0	3–0	1–2	3–2
Girona	1–0	3–1	1–2	0–1	3–1	1–1	—	2–2	1–1	0–2	6–0	1–1	4–0	0–1	2–2	1–1	1–1	1–1	1–1	2–1	2–2	2–0
Hércules	2–0	1–2	1–2	0–1	0–2	0–0	0–0	—	0–1	2–1	1–1	2–2	1–0	2–3	0–0	1–0	2–1	1–2	3–0	0–1	2–3	1–1
Jaén	2–3	1–0	0–3	0–0	0–0	1–2	3–1	1–1	—	3–0	0–0	2–1	1–2	3–2	0–0	0–1	0–1	3–1	0–1	3–2	1–0	3–0
Las Palmas	0–2	1–0	0–2	2–0	0–1	1–1	2–1	2–1	1–0	—	0–0	2–2	3–1	0–0	0–0	3–2	0–2	2–3	5–0	2–1	1–0	0–1
Lugo	0–1	1–2	1–0	1–0	2–2	0–0	1–2	1–3	4–2	3–0	—	2–1	1–0	1–1	0–0	3–0	1–1	2–0	1–0	1–3	1–3	1–0
Mallorca	2–1	2–1	1–2	2–2	0–3	0–2	2–0	0–1	0–0	2–0	0–0	—	1–0	2–4	0–0	2–2	2–0	0–0	4–1	1–3	2–0	2–4
Mirandés	2–3	1–1	2–1	3–1	1–0	1–4	1–2	0–1	2–1	2–1	2–0	0–0	—	1–1	0–0	1–0	2–1	0–3	2–2	1–1	2–0	0–1
Murcia	2–1	1–1	3–1	2–2	1–0	0–0	1–0	1–2	2–0	1–3	3–1	2–2	5–0	—	2–1	2–2	1–0	2–3	2–0	1–1	1–2	1–1
Numancia	0–2	0–1	1–0	3–0	2–1	1–1	0–0	1–1	4–2	1–1	0–1	1–1	0–1	1–0	—	2–0	0–0	2–3	3–1	0–0	0–0	2–2
Ponferradina	2–1	0–2	1–0	0–1	0–1	2–1	1–2	5–1	1–0	0–0	0–2	2–0	1–1	2–0	0–1	—	0–0	3–1	2–0	2–2	0–1	4–2
Real Madrid Castilla	1–0	0–1	3–1	3–1	0–2	0–1	3–2	4–0	1–1	3–2	2–0	1–2	0–1	2–2	0–0	1–1	—	1–2	2–1	1–2	2–2	1–2
Recreativo	0–2	2–1	3–0	1–1	0–1	1–2	1–0	2–0	1–1	1–3	3–3	3–1	1–0	0–0	0–0	1–0	2–3	—	1–2	1–1	2–1	2–2
Sabadell	0–4	1–2	2–1	3–2	0–3	1–0	4–0	2–1	3–0	0–0	1–0	4–0	3–1	2–1	0–0	1–1	3–2	0–0	—	2–0	1–0	1–0
Sporting Gijón	2–0	2–2	1–0	1–2	2–0	3–2	3–1	2–1	1–1	2–3	2–0	3–0	3–2	0–0	2–2	1–1	1–0	0–0	3–1	—	3–0	2–3
Tenerife	2–0	0–4	2–2	0–1	2–0	2–0	0–1	0–0	2–1	3–0	0–1	0–1	3–0	0–1	3–2	5–0	1–0	1–0	0–3	0–0	—	1–1
Zaragoza	2–2	3–1	0–2	2–1	0–1	1–0	1–0	0–0	1–0	1–2	0–1	1–1	0–0	0–0	1–2	2–1	0–2	1–2	2–2	1–1	3–0	—

Source: BDFutbol
Legend: Blue = home team win; Yellow = draw; Red = away team win.

== Promotion play-offs ==
This promotion phase (known as Promoción de ascenso) is to determine the third team which will be promoted to 2014–15 La Liga. Teams placed between 3rd and 6th position (excluding reserve teams) take part in the promotion play-offs. Fifth placed faces against the fourth, while the sixth positioned team faces against the third. The first leg of the semi-finals will be played on 11 June, the best positioned team plays at home the second leg on 15 June. The final will also be two-legged, with the first leg on 19 June and the second leg on 22 June, with the best positioned team also playing at home the second leg.

In case of a draw after the overtime in the second leg, there will not be a penalty shoot-out, and the best positioned team in the league table directly passes to the next round.

=== Play-offs ===
Semi-finals
6	Las Palmas	1	1	2
5	Sporting de Gijón	0	0	0
7	Córdoba	0	2	2
4	Murcia	0	1	1

Final
7	Córdoba	0	1	1
6	Las Palmas	0	1	1

==== Semifinals ====
===== First leg =====
11 June 2014	Córdoba	0 – 0	Murcia	Córdoba
20:00 CEST		Report		Stadium: Nuevo Arcángel; Attendance: 14,000; Referee: Dámaso Arcediano Monescillo

11 June 2014	Las Palmas	1 – 0	Sporting de Gijón	Las Palmas de Gran Canaria
21:00 WEST	Aranda 21'	Report		Stadium: Gran Canaria; Attendance: 12,440; Referee: Daniel Ocón Arraiz

===== Second leg =====
15 June 2014	Sporting de Gijón	0 – 1 (0–2 agg.)	Las Palmas	Gijón
19:00 CEST		Report	Asdrúbal 90+4'	Stadium: El Molinón; Attendance: 20,073; Referee: David Medié Jiménez

15 June 2014	Murcia	1 – 2 (1–2 agg.)	Córdoba	Murcia
21:00 CEST	Wellington 52'	Report	Pedro 7'; Raúl Bravo 57'	Stadium: Nueva Condomina; Attendance: 16,794; Referee: Santiago Jaime Latre

==== Final ====
19 June 2014 First leg	Córdoba	0 – 0	Las Palmas	Córdoba
20:00 CEST		Report		Stadium: Nuevo Arcángel; Attendance: 19,000; Referee: Iñaki Vicandi Garrido

22 June 2014 Second leg	Las Palmas	1 − 1 (1–1 agg.)	Córdoba	Las Palmas de Gran Canaria
18:00 CEST	Apoño 48'		Ulises Dávila 90+3'	Stadium: Gran Canaria; Attendance: 31,240; Referee: José María Sánchez Martínez

Promoted to La Liga
Córdoba
(42 years later)

== Season statistics ==
=== Top goalscorers ===
Rank	Player	Club	Goals
1	(Spain) Borja Viguera	Alavés	25
2	(Spain) Kike	Murcia	23
2	(Serbia) Stefan Šćepović	Sporting	23
4	(Mexico) Aníbal	Sabadell	18
5	(Spain) Ayoze Pérez	Tenerife	16
5	(Honduras) Jona	Jaén	16
7	(Italy) Vincenzo Rennella	Lugo	13
7	(Brazil) Yuri	Ponferradina	13
9	(Spain) Roger	Zaragoza	12
9	(Serbia) Dejan Lekić	Sporting	12

=== Zamora Trophy ===
The Zamora Trophy is awarded by newspaper Marca to the goalkeeper with least goals-to-games ratio. Keepers must play at least 28 games of 60 or more minutes to be eligible for the trophy.

In the table, only goalkeepers with at least the 70% of the games played are included.

Rank	Name	Club	Goals Against	Matches	Average
1	(Spain) Xabi Iruretagoiena	Eibar	26	39	0.67
2	(Argentina) Germán Lux	Deportivo	29	36	0.81
3	(Spain) René	Jaén	31	33	0.94
4	(Spain) Dani Giménez	Alcorcón	40	42	0.95
5	(Spain) Casto	Murcia	42	41	1.02
6	(Spain) Jordi Masip	Barcelona B	37	34	1.09
7	(Argentina) Mariano Barbosa	Las Palmas	45	40	1.13
7	(Spain) Isaac Becerra	Girona	45	40	1.13
9	(Spain) Iván Cuéllar	Sporting	47	40	1.18
10	(Spain) Roberto Santamaría	Ponferradina	45	37	1.22

== Attendances ==
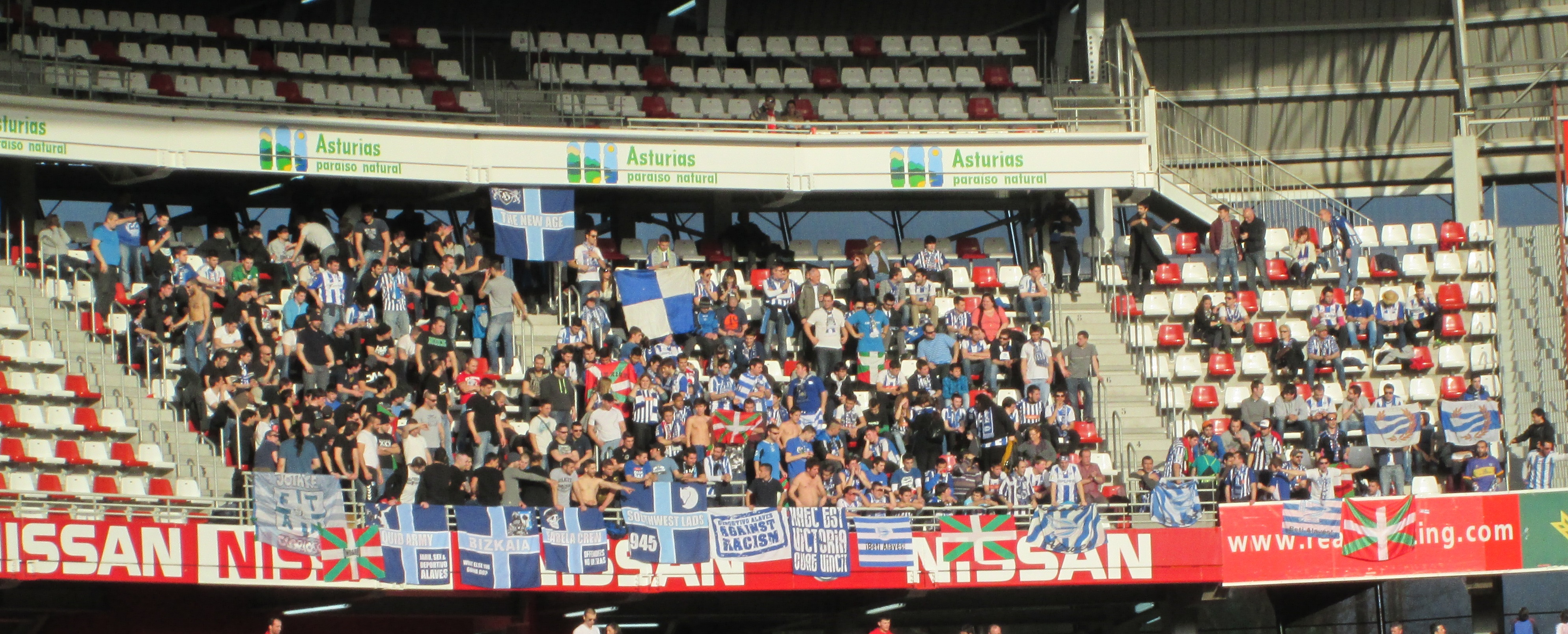
Alavés fans attending at El Molinón in February 2014.

Pos	Team	Total	High	Low	Average	Change
1	Deportivo La Coruña	465,146	33,639	15,672	22,150	−19.5%^{1}
2	Sporting Gijón	377,307	22,315	13,265	17,150	+8.0%
3	Las Palmas	274,194	31,240	6,697	11,921	−1.2%
4	Córdoba	253,990	20,848	4,600	11,221	+17.4%
5	Tenerife	218,202	18,040	7,180	10,391	+17.7%^{2}
6	Alavés	207,310	14,356	6,724	9,872	+42.3%^{2}
7	Zaragoza	207,000	18,000	5,000	9,857	−5.2%^{1}
8	Mallorca	195,325	15,252	5,475	9,301	−25.7%^{1}
9	Murcia	186,765	16,794	5,964	8,489	+17.5%
10	Jaén	158,103	12,100	4,749	7,529	+115.1%^{2}
11	Hércules	153,997	10,334	3,375	7,333	+1.4%
12	Recreativo	148,885	12,418	5,005	7,090	+43.8%
13	Ponferradina	106,191	8,000	2,562	5,057	−19.6%
14	Girona	101,166	8,846	2,231	4,817	−18.4%
15	Sabadell	87,387	10,182	1,645	4,161	+19.0%
16	Mirandés	84,583	5,473	2,812	4,028	−14.0%
17	Barcelona B	77,784	9,003	1,205	3,704	−27.6%
18	Lugo	77,233	7,564	2,500	3,678	−7.0%
19	Alcorcón	66,138	4,900	1,700	3,149	−6.5%
20	Numancia	65,113	6,207	1,702	3,101	+3.9%
21	Real Madrid Castilla	64,825	4,049	1,136	3,087	+7.8%
22	Eibar	63,441	5,129	1,807	3,021	+140.0%^{2}
	League total	3,644,185	33,639	1,136	7,787	+15.0%

Updated to games played on 22 June 2014
Source: Official websites and other Spanish media
Notes:
Attendance numbers of the 2012–13 season without playoff matches.
1: Team played last season in La Liga
2: Team played last season in Segunda División B

== Awards ==
=== Monthly awards ===
Month	Manager of the Month		Player of the Month		Reference
Month	Manager	Club	Player	Club	Reference
September	(Spain) Sergi Barjuán	Recreativo	(Serbia) Stefan Šćepović	Sporting	
October	(Spain) Quique Setién	Lugo	(Spain) Manuel Arana	Recreativo	
November	(Spain) Gaizka Garitano	Eibar	(Spain) Borja Viguera	Alavés	
December	(Spain) Gaizka Garitano	Eibar	(Spain) José Luis Morales	Eibar	
January	(Spain) Paco Herrera	Zaragoza	(Spain) Roger	Zaragoza	
February	(Spain) Gaizka Garitano	Eibar	(Spain) Jota	Eibar	
March	(Spain) Sergio Lobera	Las Palmas	(Spain) Ayoze Pérez	Tenerife	
April	(Spain) Álvaro Cervera	Tenerife	(Spain) Ayoze Pérez	Tenerife	
May	(Spain) José Bordalás	Alcorcón	(Spain) Kike	Murcia	

== Teams by autonomous community ==
	Autonomous community	Number of teams	Teams
1	Andalusia	3	Córdoba, Jaén and Recreativo
1	Castile and León	3	Mirandés, Numancia and Ponferradina
1	Catalonia	3	Barcelona B, Girona and Sabadell
4	(Basque Country (autonomous community)) Basque Country	2	Alavés and Eibar
4	Canary Islands	2	Las Palmas and Tenerife
4	Community of Madrid	2	Alcorcón and Real Madrid Castilla
4	(Galicia (Spain)) Galicia	2	Deportivo La Coruña and Lugo
8	Aragon	1	Zaragoza
8	Asturias	1	Sporting Gijón
8	Balearic Islands	1	Mallorca
8	Region of Murcia	1	Murcia
8	Valencian Community	1	Hércules

== See also ==
- List of Spanish football transfers summer 2013
- 2013–14 La Liga
- 2013–14 Segunda División B
- 2013–14 Copa del Rey
