= FC L'Escala =

L'Escala
- Full name: Fútbol Club L'Escala
- Nickname: FCL'E
- Founded: 1912
- Ground: Estadi Municipal; L'Escala, Catalonia, Spain
- Capacity: 700
- President: Josep Costa 'Pipa'
- Head coach: Arnau Sala
- League: Tercera Federación – Group 5
- 2025–26: Tercera Federación – Group 5, 7th of 18
Home colours	Away colours

Futbol Club L'Escala is a Catalan Spanish football club based in L'Escala in the comarca of the Alt Empordà in Catalonia, Spain. Founded in 1912, they play in the Tercera Federación – Group 5, holding home matches at the Estadi Municipal de L'Escala.

== Season to season ==
Season	Tier	Division	Place	Copa del Rey
1939–40	7	2ª Reg.	4th	
1940–41	DNP			
1941–42	DNP			
1942–43	DNP			
1943–44	6	2ª Reg.	6th	
1944–45	8	3ª Reg.	6th	
1945–46	6	2ª Reg.	3rd	
1946–1964	DNP			
1964–65	5	2ª Reg.	10th	
1965–66	5	2ª Reg.	10th	
1966–67	5	2ª Reg.	13th	
1967–68	5	2ª Reg.	3rd	
1968–69	5	2ª Reg.	13th	
1969–70	5	1ª Reg.	14th	
1970–71	5	1ª Reg.	20th	
1971–72	6	2ª Reg.	2nd	
1972–73	5	1ª Reg.	20th	
1973–74	6	2ª Reg.	15th	
1974–75	6	2ª Reg.	6th	
1975–76	6	2ª Reg.	2nd	

Season	Tier	Division	Place	Copa del Rey
1976–77	6	2ª Reg.	4th	
1977–78	7	2ª Reg.	16th	
1978–79	7	2ª Reg.	5th	
1979–80	7	2ª Reg.	7th	
1980–81	7	2ª Reg.	20th	
1981–82	8	3ª Reg.	1st	
1982–83	7	2ª Reg.	13th	
1983–84	7	2ª Reg.	2nd	
1984–85	6	1ª Reg.	12th	
1985–86	6	1ª Reg.	4th	
1986–87	6	1ª Reg.	8th	
1987–88	6	1ª Reg.	2nd	
1988–89	6	1ª Reg.	2nd	
1989–90	6	1ª Reg.	7th	
1990–91	6	1ª Reg.	5th	
1991–92	7	1ª Terr.	8th	
1992–93	7	1ª Terr.	4th	
1993–94	7	1ª Terr.	5th	
1994–95	7	1ª Terr.	12th	
1995–96	7	1ª Terr.	14th	

Season	Tier	Division	Place	Copa del Rey
1996–97	8	2ª Terr.	2nd	
1997–98	7	1ª Terr.	4th	
1998–99	7	1ª Terr.	10th	
1999–2000	7	1ª Terr.	7th	
2000–01	7	1ª Terr.	4th	
2001–02	7	1ª Terr.	1st	
2002–03	6	Pref. Terr.	2nd	
2003–04	6	Pref. Terr.	2nd	
2004–05	6	Pref. Terr.	5th	
2005–06	6	Pref. Terr.	3rd	
2006–07	6	Pref. Terr.	11th	
2007–08	6	Pref. Terr.	15th	
2008–09	7	1ª Terr.	7th	
2009–10	7	1ª Terr.	4th	
2010–11	7	1ª Terr.	8th	
2011–12	6	2ª Cat.	15th	
2012–13	7	3ª Cat.	1st	
2013–14	6	2ª Cat.	1st	
2014–15	5	1ª Cat.	5th	
2015–16	5	1ª Cat.	16th	

Season	Tier	Division	Place	Copa del Rey
2016–17	6	2ª Cat.	4th	
2017–18	6	2ª Cat.	5th	
2018–19	6	2ª Cat.	1st	
2019–20	5	1ª Cat.	11th	
2020–21	5	1ª Cat.	4th	
2021–22	6	1ª Cat.	3rd	
2022–23	6	1ª Cat.	1st	
2023–24	5	3ª Fed.	7th	
2024–25	5	3ª Fed.	11th	
2025–26	5	3ª Fed.	7th	
2026–27	5	3ª Fed.		

- 4 seasons in Tercera Federación
