= Strong FC =

Football club in Spain active between 1909 and 1916

- Full name: Strong Football Club
- Founded: 1909
- Dissolved: 1916
- Ground: Camp de Mart de la Devesa
Home colours

The Strong Football Club was a football team based in Girona, Catalonia, Spain, which existed from 1909 until its dissolution in 1916. It was one of the most prominent teams in Girona in the early 1910s. In 1916, the club merged with Centre Gironenc to form UD Gerona, which later became Girona FC.

== History ==
Strong FC was founded in 1909 by the Surribas brothers, whose father gave the entity a name of English origin, together with some young students from well-off families, including Carles Bellsolà, Salvador Hormeu, and Josep Espona i Puig, with the latter being the son of the professor and mayor of Girona Joaquim Espona i de Nuix, and being elected as the club's first president. After two years of lethargy, these students began spreading their love of football with the yellow and blue colors of Strong, playing its first official match on 3 September 1911, against Sport Club Empordanès from Figueres at the Camp de Mart de la Devesa, currently Parc de la Devesa, which ended in a 3–3 draw; the first line-up was formed by Planells; Oliver, Bellsolà; Peña, Surribas, Boada; Coll, Plaja, Hormeu, Saguer and Rosillo.

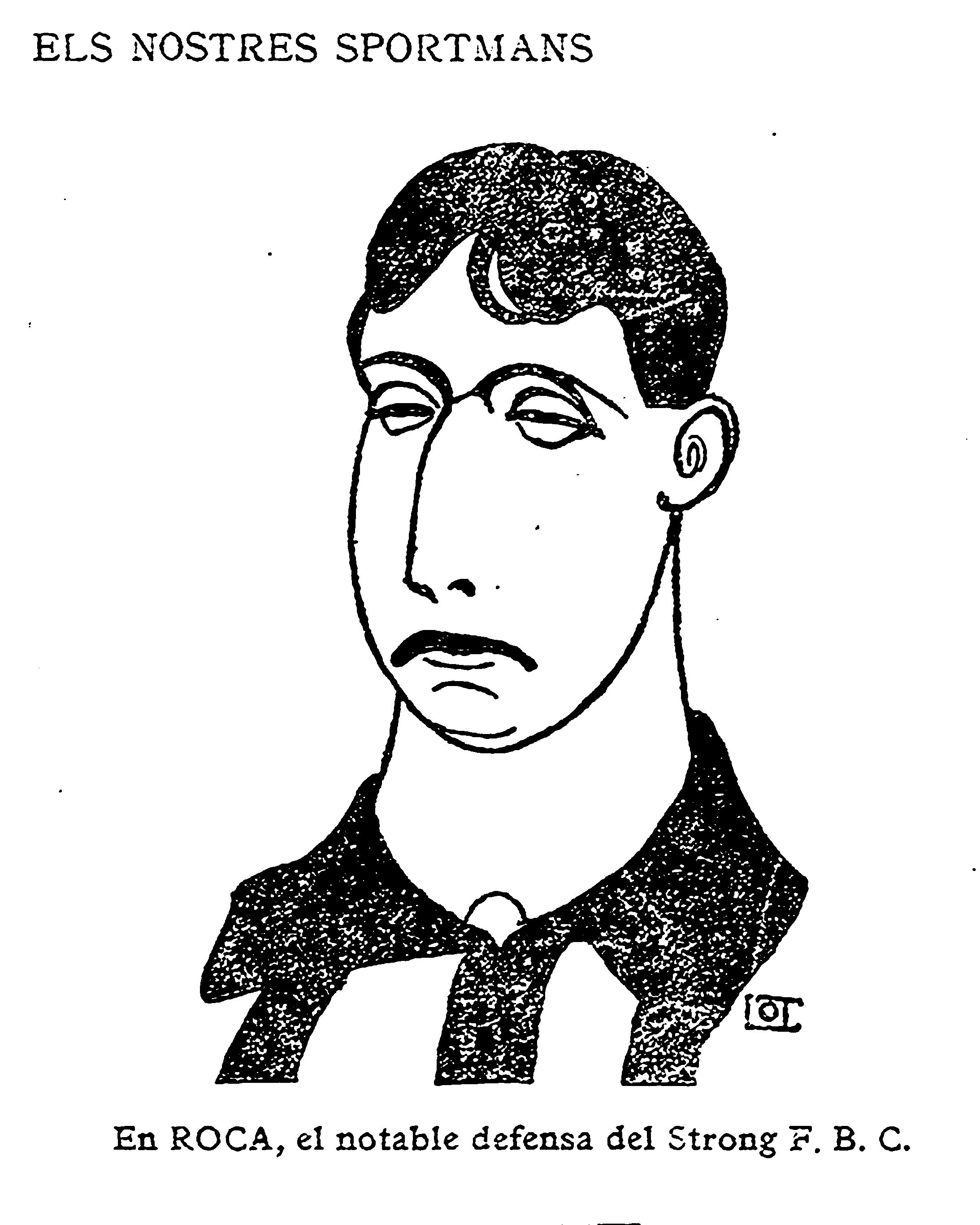
Francesc Roca

Strong had its first real test on the occasion of the Sant Narcís Fairs of 1912, with the visit of the Universitary of Barcelona (2–6). It was also around this time that Strong developed a rivalry with SC Gironí. This period also coincided with the emergence of a historical figure of Girona football, Francesc Roca, who, together with Bellsolà, Hormeu, and Narciso Callicó, attracted the masses to the Devesa. Its success inspired the creation of more local teams, most notably Sport FC, whose matches with Strong served as the basis of the local football fan base.

The entity, which had different sections and grassroots teams, remained active until the summer of 1916, when a confrontation between internal factions led to a split and the subsequent departure of the club's most important players (Roca and Bellsolà), so the club ended up merging with Centre Gironenc to form UD Gerona, which later became Girona FC.

== Notable players ==
- Francesc Roca
- Carles Bellsolà
- Salvador Hormeu
- Narciso Callicó
