= 2001–02 CA Osasuna season =

CA Osasuna
2001–02 season
- President: Javier Miranda Martínez
- Head coach: Miguel Ángel Lotina
- Stadium: El Sadar
- La Liga: 17th
- Copa del Rey: Round of 322
- Top goalscorer: League: John Aloisi (9); All: John Aloisi (9)
- Average home league attendance: 16,861
- Biggest win: Osasuna 4–0 Mallorca
- Biggest defeat: Deportivo La Coruña 5–1 Osasuna

The 2001–02 Club Atlético Osasuna season was the club's 82nd season in existence and the club's second consecutive season in the top flight of Spanish football. In addition to the domestic league, Osasuna participated in this season's edition of the Copa del Rey.

== Competitions ==
=== Overview ===
Competition	First match	Last match	Starting round	Final position	Record							
Competition	First match	Last match	Starting round	Final position	Pld	W	D	L	GF	GA	GD	Win %
La Liga	26 August 2001	11 May 2002	Matchday 1	17th	38	10	12	16	36	49	−13	26.32
Copa del Rey	7 November 2001	27 November 2001	First round	Round of 32	2	1	1	0	2	1	+1	50.00
Total					40	11	13	16	38	50	−12	27.50

Source: Competitions

=== La Liga ===
==== League table ====
Pos	Team	Pld	W	D	L	GF	GA	GD	Pts	Qualification or relegation
15	Villarreal	38	11	10	17	46	55	−9	43 (Note: MLL 0–1 VIL; VIL 2–1 MLL)	Qualification for the Intertoto Cup second round
16	Mallorca	38	11	10	17	40	52	−12	43	
17	Osasuna	38	10	12	16	36	49	−13	42	
18	Las Palmas (R)	38	9	13	16	40	50	−10	40	Relegation to the Segunda División
19	Tenerife (R)	38	10	8	20	32	58	−26	38	Relegation to the Segunda División

Source: LFP
Rules for classification: 1st points; 2nd head-to-head points; 3rd head-to-head goal difference; 4th head-to-head goals scored; 5th goal difference; 6th number of goals scored; 7th Fair-play points
(R) Relegated

==== Results summary ====
Overall								Home						Away					
Pld	W	D	L	GF	GA	GD	Pts	W	D	L	GF	GA	GD	W	D	L	GF	GA	GD
0	0	0	0	0	0	0	0	0	0	0	0	0	0	0	0	0	0	0	0

==== Results by round ====
Round	1	2	3	4	5	6	7	8	9	10	11	12	13	14	15	16	17	18	19	20	21	22	23	24	25	26	27	28
Ground	H	A	H	A	H	A	A	H	A	H	A	H	A	H	A	H	A	H	A	A	H	A	H	A	H	H	A	H
Result	L	L	D	W	W	W	D	L	L	W	L	D	L	L	L	W	D	L	W	D	D	W	D	D	W	D	L	D
Position																												

A = Away; H = Home; W = Win; D = Draw; L = Loss

==== Matches ====
26 August 2001 1	Osasuna	0–3	Celta Vigo	Pamplona
CEST (UTC+2)				Stadium: El Sadar

8 September 2001 2	Villarreal	3–0	Osasuna	Villarreal
CEST (UTC+2)

15 September 2001 3	Osasuna	0–0	Barcelona	Pamplona
CEST (UTC+2)				Stadium: El Sadar

23 September 2001 4	Zaragoza	0–1	Osasuna	Zaragoza
CEST (UTC+2)

30 September 2001 5	Osasuna	1–0	Sevilla	Pamplona
CEST (UTC+2)				Stadium: El Sadar

3 October 2001 6	Rayo Vallecano	0–1	Osasuna	Madrid
CEST (UTC+2)

7 October 2001 7	Espanyol	1–1	Osasuna	Barcelona
CEST (UTC+2)

14 October 2001 8	Osasuna	0–2	Tenerife	Pamplona
CEST (UTC+2)				Stadium: El Sadar

20 October 2001 9	Real Sociedad	2–1	Osasuna	San Sebastián
CEST (UTC+2)

27 October 2001 10	Osasuna	4–0	Mallorca	Pamplona
CEST (UTC+2)				Stadium: El Sadar

4 November 2001 11	Deportivo La Coruña	5–1	Osasuna	A Coruña
CET (UTC+1)

11 November 2001 12	Osasuna	0–0	Valencia	Pamplona
CET (UTC+1)				Stadium: El Sadar

18 November 2001 13	Málaga	2–1	Osasuna	Málaga
CET (UTC+1)

25 November 2001 14	Osasuna	1–2	Real Betis	Pamplona
CET (UTC+1)				Stadium: El Sadar

1 December 2001 15	Real Madrid	2–1	Osasuna	Madrid
CET (UTC+1)

9 December 2001 16	Osasuna	1–0	Valladolid	Pamplona
CET (UTC+1)				Stadium: El Sadar

15 December 2001 17	Las Palmas	1–1	Osasuna	Las Palmas
CET (UTC+1)

23 December 2001 18	Osasuna	0–1	Athletic Bilbao	Pamplona
CET (UTC+1)				Stadium: El Sadar

6 January 2002 19	Alavés	0–2	Osasuna	Vitoria-Gasteiz
CET (UTC+1)

13 January 2002 20	Celta Vigo	1–1	Osasuna	Vigo
CET (UTC+1)

20 January 2002 21	Osasuna	2–2	Villarreal	Pamplona
CET (UTC+1)				Stadium: El Sadar

27 January 2002 22	Barcelona	0–1	Osasuna	Barcelona
CET (UTC+1)

3 February 2002 23	Osasuna	0–0	Zaragoza	Pamplona
CET (UTC+1)				Stadium: El Sadar

6 February 2002 24	Sevilla	0–0	Osasuna	Seville
CET (UTC+1)

10 February 2002 25	Osasuna	1–0	Rayo Vallecano	Pamplona
CET (UTC+1)				Stadium: El Sadar

17 February 2002 26	Osasuna	1–1	Espanyol	Pamplona
CET (UTC+1)				Stadium: El Sadar

24 February 2002 27	Tenerife	3–1	Osasuna	Santa Cruz de Tenerife
CET (UTC+1)

3 March 2002 28	Osasuna	1–1	Real Sociedad	Pamplona
CET (UTC+1)				Stadium: El Sadar

=== Copa del Rey ===
7 November 2001 Round of 32	UDA Gramenet	1–2	Osasuna
CET (UTC+1)

27 November 2001 Round of 32	UE Figueres	0–0 (4–2 p)	Osasuna	Santa Cruz de Tenerife
CET (UTC+1)
