= 2001–02 Copa del Rey =

100th Copa del Rey

Tournament details
- Country: Spain
- Teams: 80

Final positions
- Champions: Deportivo de La Coruña
- Runners-up: Real Madrid

Tournament statistics
- Matches played: 108
- Goals scored: 261 (2.42 per match)
- Top goal scorer(s): Guti (6); Raúl (6)

The 2001–02 Copa del Rey was the 100th staging of the Copa del Rey.

The competition started on 6 September 2001 and concluded on 6 March 2002 with the final, held at the Santiago Bernabéu Stadium in Madrid, in which Deportivo de La Coruña lifted the trophy with a 2–1 victory over Real Madrid.

== Preliminary round ==
Team 1	Agg.	Team 2	1st leg	2nd leg
SD Lemona	4–1	Zamora CF	3–0	1–1
CF Palencia	1–4	Marino	0–2	1–2
SD Noja	2–4	CD Ourense	1–0	1–4
C.D. Endesa As Pontes	0–2	Amurrio Club	0–0	0–2
CF Gavà	1–2	CE L'Hospitalet	1–1	0–1
CD Teruel	1–10	UE Figueres	1–2	0–8
CE Sabadell FC	1–2	CD Logroñés	0–0	1–2
UDA Gramenet	2–1	SD Beasain	1–0	1–1
CF Rayo Majadahonda	0–2	UD Vecindario	0–0	0–2
CD Quintanar del Rey	1–3	Pájara Playas	1–1	0–2
CD Castellón	1–2	Novelda CF	0–2	1–0
UD Lanzarote	2–1	Alicante CF	2–0	0–1
CD Toledo	4–0	CD Calahorra	2–0	2–0
Atlético Lucentino Industrial	2–2 (a)	Ciudad de Murcia	2–1	0–1
UD Marbella	0–1	CD Díter Zafra	0–1	0–0
Granada CF	1–6	Cádiz CF	0–2	1–4
Atlético Baleares	2–6	AD Ceuta	2–1	0–5

== Round of 64 ==
Team 1	Score	Team 2
SD Lemona	2–3 (aet)	Celta Vigo
Amurrio Club	1–3	Athletic Bilbao
Pajara Playas	0–4	Real Madrid
Atlético Madrid	1–3	Rayo Vallecano
UE Figueres	1–0 (aet)	FC Barcelona
Novelda CF	0–1	Valencia CF
SD Compostela	1–2	CD Alavés
CD Ourense	1–1 (3–5 p.)	Real Valladolid
Marino	1–4	Deportivo La Coruña
CD Díter Zafra	0–1	RCD Mallorca
UE Lleida	1–0	RCD Espanyol
CD Logroñés	0–0 (5–4 p.)	Real Zaragoza
CE L'Hospitalet	2–1	Real Sociedad
Cádiz CF	1–2	Málaga CF
Ciudad de Murcia	2–1	Sevilla FC
UD Vecindario	1–2	UD Las Palmas
Getafe CF	1–2	Villarreal CF
UDA Gramenet	1–2	CA Osasuna
UD Lanzarote	5–1	CD Tenerife
Sporting Gijón	4–2	Real Oviedo
Cultural Leonesa	1–0	Racing Santander
UD Salamanca	2–0	CD Numancia
Racing Ferrol	1–0	Burgos CF
Gimnàstic de Tarragona	1–0	SD Eibar
Albacete Balompié	1–0	Elche CF
Levante UD	2–1	CD Leganés
Córdoba CF	1–0	Real Murcia
Real Jaén	2–0	Xerez CD
CP Ejido	1–2	Recreativo de Huelva
CF Extremadura	1–1 (2–4 p.)	CD Badajoz
AD Ceuta	4–1 (aet)	Real Betis

== Round of 32 ==
Team 1	Score	Team 2
UE Figueres	0–0 (4–2 pen)	CA Osasuna
Novelda CF	1–0	UD Las Palmas
Cultural Leonesa	1–2	Deportivo La Coruña
UD Salamanca	1–0 (aet)	Celta Vigo
Racing Ferrol	1–2	Real Valladolid
Sporting Gijón	2–0	Deportivo Alavés
UD Lanzarote	1–3	Real Madrid
CD Logroñés	0–3	CE L'Hospitalet
CD Toledo	2–3 (aet)	Athletic Bilbao
Albacete Balompié	1–3	Rayo Vallecano
Córdoba CF	1–0	Real Jaén
CD Badajoz	0–0 (5–3 pen)	Recreativo de Huelva
AD Ceuta	0–0 (4–5 pen)	RCD Mallorca
UE Lleida	1–2	Gimnàstic de Tarragona
Levante UD	1–1 (4–5 pen)	Villarreal CF
Ciudad de Murcia	1–1 (4–2 pen)	Málaga CF

== Round of 16 ==
Team 1	Agg.	Team 2	1st leg	2nd leg
Badajoz	1–6	Real Valladolid	1–3	0–3
Ciudad de Murcia	0–1	Rayo Vallecano	0–0	0–1
Córdoba	3–2	Mallorca	2–1	1–1
Figueres	2–1	Novelda	2–1	0–0
Gimnàstic de Tarragona	3–4	Real Madrid	1–0	2–4
Salamanca	2–4	Athletic Bilbao	2–2	0–2
Sporting Gijón	3–7	Villarreal	2–4	1–3
L'Hospitalet		Deportivo La Coruña		

=== First leg ===
12 December 2001	Badajoz	1–3	Real Valladolid	Badajoz
20:30 CET	Rodri 31'	Report (in Spanish)	Flores 21'; García 47'; Tote 71'	Stadium: Nuevo Vivero; Attendance: 5,000; Referee: Luis Medina Cantalejo (Andalusia)

12 December 2001	Ciudad de Murcia	0–0	Rayo Vallecano	Murcia
21:30 CET		Report (in Spanish)		Stadium: La Condomina; Attendance: 8,000; Referee: Bernardino González Vázquez (Galicia (Spain))

12 December 2001	Córdoba	2–1	Mallorca	Córdoba
21:00 CET	Platero 22'; Lawal 70'	Report (in Spanish)	Riera 68'	Stadium: Nuevo Arcángel; Attendance: 6,000; Referee: Javier Turienzo Álvarez (Castile and León)

12 December 2001	Figueres	2–1	Novelda	Figueres
21:00 CET	Arnau 48'; Eloi 84'	Report (in Spanish)	Madrigal 74'	Stadium: Vilatenim; Attendance: 2,000; Referee: Juan Carlos Jaso Delgado (Navarre)

12 December 2001	Gimnàstic de Tarragona	1–0	Real Madrid	Tarragona
20:30 CET	Karanka 83' (o.g.)	Report (in Spanish)		Stadium: Nou Estadi; Attendance: 13,000; Referee: Arturo Daudén Ibáñez (Aragon)

12 December 2001	Salamanca	2–2	Athletic Bilbao	Villares de la Reina
20:45 CET	Rogerio 55'; Robert 73'	Report (in Spanish)	Ezquerro 22', 44'	Stadium: Helmántico; Attendance: 6,000; Referee: Evaristo Puentes Leira (Galicia (Spain))

12 December 2001	Sporting Gijón	2–4	Villarreal	Gijón
20:45 CET	Álvarez 28', 90'	Report (in Spanish)	Craioveanu 45'; López 61', 76'; Martín 72'	Stadium: El Molinón; Attendance: 4,500; Referee: Alfonso Pérez Burrull (Cantabria)

=== Second leg ===
18 December 2001	Real Madrid	4–2	Gimnàstic de Tarragona	Madrid
21:30 CET	Raúl 4', 45', 48'; Guti 30'	Report (in Spanish)	Cuéllar 1'; Herrero 15'	Stadium: Santiago Bernabéu; Attendance: 5,000; Referee: Fernando Carmona Méndez (Extremadura)

19 December 2001	Real Valladolid	3–0	Badajoz	Valladolid
21:30 CET	Óscar 46'; García 57'; Sales 81'	Report (in Spanish)		Stadium: Nuevo José Zorrilla; Attendance: 4,500; Referee: Víctor José Esquinas Torres (Community of Madrid)

19 December 2001	Rayo Vallecano	1–0	Ciudad de Murcia	Madrid
21:30 CET	Bolo 88'	Report (in Spanish)		Stadium: Teresa Rivero; Attendance: 6,000; Referee: Juan Ansuátegui Roca (Valencian Community)

19 December 2001	Mallorca	1–1	Córdoba	Palma de Mallorca
21:30 CET	Eto'o 8'	Report (in Spanish)	Cámara 56'	Stadium: Son Moix; Attendance: 6,000; Referee: Miguel Ángel Pérez Lasa (Basque Country (autonomous community))

19 December 2001	Novelda	0–0	Figueres	Novelda
21:30 CET		Report (in Spanish)		Stadium: La Magdalena; Attendance: 4,000; Referee: Juan Pereñíguez Pérez (Region of Murcia)

19 December 2001	Athletic Bilbao	2–0	Salamanca	Bilbao
21:30 CET	Guerrero 46'; Yeste 71'	Report (in Spanish)		Stadium: San Mamés; Attendance: 32,000; Referee: Alberto Undiano Mallenco (Navarre)

19 December 2001	Villarreal	3–1	Sporting Gijón	Vila-real
21:30 CET	Cagna 25'; Martín 79', 85'	Report (in Spanish)	Brasi 15'	Stadium: El Madrigal; Attendance: 4,000; Referee: Jesús Téllez Sánchez (Catalonia)

== Quarter-finals ==
Team 1	Agg.	Team 2	1st leg	2nd leg
Real Madrid	4–1	Rayo Vallecano	4–0	0–1
Villarreal	0–3	Athletic Bilbao	0–2	0–1
Deportivo La Coruña	3–2	Real Valladolid	2–0	1–2 (aet)
Córdoba	0–2	Figueres	0–2	0–0

=== First leg ===
8 January 2002	Real Madrid	4–0	Rayo Vallecano	Madrid
21:30 CET	Roberto Carlos 33'; Raúl 78'; Zidane 81'; Figo 84'	Report (in Spanish)		Stadium: Santiago Bernabéu; Attendance: 42,000; Referee: Eduardo Iturralde González (Basque Country (autonomous community))

9 January 2002	Villarreal	0–2	Athletic Bilbao	Vilarreal
21:00 CET		Report (in Spanish)	Tiko 16', 20'	Stadium: El Madrigal; Attendance: 8,000; Referee: Alfonso Pino Zamorano (Castilla–La Mancha)

9 January 2002	Córdoba	0–2	Figueres	Córdoba
21:00 CET		Report (in Spanish)	Peña 52'; Eloi 84'	Stadium: Nuevo Arcángel; Attendance: 5,000; Referee: Fernando Teixeira Vitienes (Cantabria)

9 January 2002	Deportivo La Coruña	2–0	Real Valladolid	A Coruña
20:45 CET	Capdevila 46'; Makaay 61'	Report (in Spanish)		Stadium: Riazor; Attendance: 14,000; Referee: Manuel Mejuto González (Asturias)

=== Second leg ===
15 January 2002	Athletic Bilbao	1–0	Villarreal	Bilbao
20:45 CET	Guerrero 13'	Report (in Spanish)		Stadium: San Mamés; Attendance: 22,000; Referee: Alexis Manuel Pérez Pérez (Canary Islands)

16 January 2002	Figueres	0–0	Córdoba	Figueres
21:30 CET		Report (in Spanish)		Stadium: Vilatenim; Attendance: 7,500; Referee: Miguel Ángel Ayza Gámez (Valencian Community)

16 January 2002	Rayo Vallecano	1–0	Real Madrid	Madrid
21:00 CET	Peragón 90'	Report (in Spanish)		Stadium: Teresa Rivero; Attendance: 5,000; Referee: Luis Medina Cantalejo (Andalusia)

16 January 2002	Real Valladolid	2–1 (a.e.t.)	Deportivo La Coruña	Valladolid
21:45 CET	Fernando 3'; Mario 34'	Report (in Spanish)	Tristán 110' (pen.)	Stadium: Nuevo José Zorrilla; Attendance: 5,000; Referee: Juan Fernández Marin (Valencian Community)

== Semi-finals ==
Team 1	Agg.	Team 2	1st leg	2nd leg
Athletic Bilbao	2–4	Real Madrid	2–1	0–3
Figueres	1–2	Deportivo La Coruña	0–1	1–1

=== First leg ===
23 January 2002	Athletic Bilbao	2–1	Real Madrid	Bilbao
20:15 CET	Etxeberria 64'; Urzaiz 85'	Report (in Spanish)	Zidane 4'	Stadium: San Mamés; Attendance: 42,000; Referee: Juan Fernández Marin (Valencian Community)

24 January 2002	Figueres	0–1	Deportivo La Coruña	Figueres
21:30 CET		Report (in Spanish)	Tristán 5'	Stadium: Vilatenim; Attendance: 7,500; Referee: Eduardo Iturralde González (Basque Country (autonomous community))

=== Second leg ===
30 January 2002	Deportivo La Coruña	1–1	Figueres	A Coruña
21:15 CET	José Manuel 6'	Report (in Spanish)	Piti 90+2' (pen.)	Stadium: Riazor; Attendance: 20,000; Referee: Alfonso Pérez Burrull (Cantabria)

30 January 2002	Real Madrid	3–0	Athletic Bilbao	Madrid
21:30 CET	Larrainzar 51' (o.g.); Raúl 58'; Guti 75'	Report (in Spanish)		Stadium: Santiago Bernabéu; Attendance: 75,000; Referee: Julián Rodríguez Santiago (Castile and León)

== Final ==
6 March 2002
21:00 CET

Real Madrid	1–2	Deportivo La Coruña
Raúl 58'	Report	Sergio 6'; Tristán 37'

Santiago Bernabéu, Madrid
Attendance: 75,000
Referee: Manuel Mejuto González

== Top goalscorers ==
Goalscorers	Goals	Team
(Spain) Guti	6	Real Madrid
(Spain) Raúl	6	Real Madrid
(Spain) Diego Tristán	5	Deportivo La Coruña
(Spain) Roberto Peragón	4	Rayo Vallecano
(Spain) Tiko	4	Athletic Bilbao
(Spain) Maciot	4	Lanzarote
(Spain) Santi Ezquerro	4	Athletic Bilbao
(Spain) José Luis Peña	4	Figueres
(Spain) Quique Martín	3	Villarreal
(Spain) Javi García	3	Hospitalet
