= Narciso Callicó =

Spanish footballer and motorsport people

Personal information
- Full name: Narciso Callicó Tomàs
- Birth name: Narcís Callicó i Tomàs
- Date of birth: 16 September 1891
- Place of birth: Gironès, Spain
- Date of death: 27 March 1927 (aged 35)
- Place of death: Gironès, Spain
- Position(s): Forward

Senior career*
Years	Team	Apps	(Gls)
1909	Girona Sport Club	2	(0)
1910	FC Barcelona III		
1912–1913	Strong FC		
- *Club domestic league appearances and goals

Narciso Callicó Tomàs (16 September 1891 – 27 March 1927) was a Spanish footballer and motorsport pioneer in Girona.

== Football career ==
Narciso Callicó was born on 16 September 1891 in Girona, but spent his childhood in Barcelona. He studied at Escola d'Arts i Oficis de Barcelona (Barcelona Arts and Crafts School), being subsidized to broaden his knowledge abroad.

When he returned to his native city, he joined the Girona Sport Club in 1909, at the age of 18, with which he played two matches against Sport Empordanès de Figueres. Frustrated with the continuity of that team due to the lack of resources and the effects of the Tragic Week, he left the club in 1910 to join the ranks of the third team of FC Barcelona. Back in Girona to do his military service, he was a center forward for Strong FBC in the 1912–13 season, a club in which he captured the popular fans with his goals, a strong personality and his physical display alongside other figures younger than him, like Francesc Roca, Carles Bellsolà and Salvador Hormeu.

On 29 June 1922, at the inaugural ceremony of the Vista Alegre sports field, in recognition of his role in the introduction of football to the city, Callicó presented a symbolic token in the form of a mascot to the then UD Girona goalkeeper, Joseph Prats.

== Motorsport ==
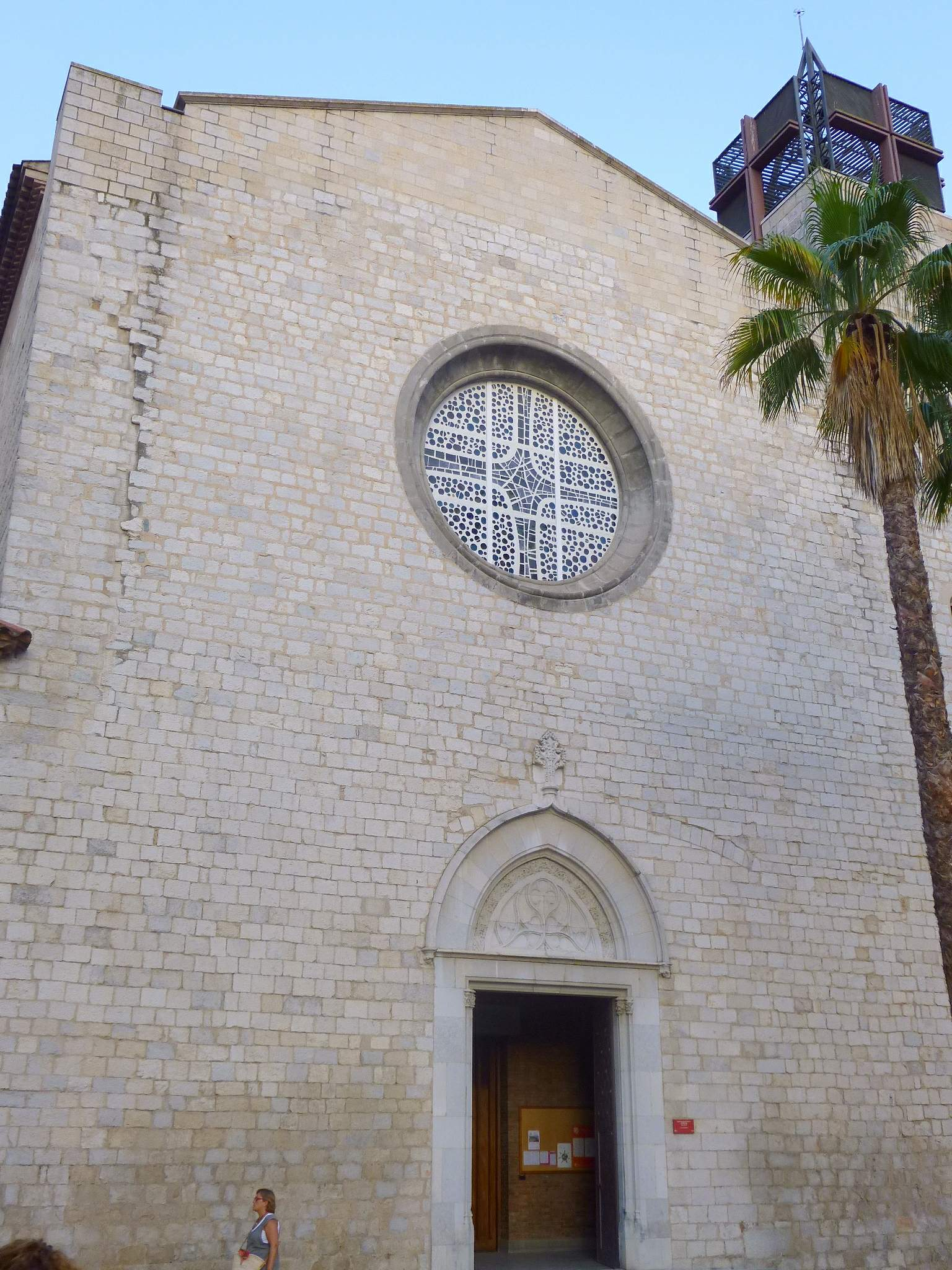
Santa Susanna del Mercadal de Girona, the church in which his funeral took place.

In the summer of 1913, Callicó retired from football and switched to motorsport. A member of the Royal Motor Club of Catalonia, he belonged to the organizing committee of the first laps in Catalonia, where he participated as a pilot or co-pilot of Buick vehicles. Together with Joaquim Cuatrecases, he won a gold medal in the IV Tour of Catalonia in 1920. Despite his modesty, his prestige was recognized among the sportsmen of that time.

In 1914, Callicó achieved the construction of the "Callicó garage" with its workshops, one of the most important in Catalonia, which was domiciled in the avenue of Jaume I in Girona. In November 1918, the "industrial accredited" Callicó was authorized to establish a public rental car service for tourism.

== Death ==
Callicó died in Girona on 27 March 1927, at the age of 35. In his obituary published two days later in the Diario de Gerona, it was stated that Callicó was "endowed with great intelligence, desire to the test, and enthusiastic about his profession" and also that he was "one of the most solid prestige of motoring in our regions". The following week, on 9 April, his funeral was held at Santa Susanna del Mercadal de Girona.
