= Albert de Quintana de León =

Spanish lawyer, politician, and sports leader

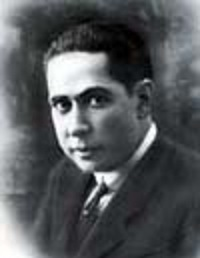
- Albert de Quintana de León
- Born: Albert de Quintana de León; 5 October 1890; Torroella de Montgrí, Girona, Spain
- Died: 18 June 1932 (aged 41); Madrid, Spain
- Citizenship: Spanish
- Occupations: Lawyer; Sports leader
- Known for: President of Girona FC

1st president of the Girona FC
- In office 23 July 1930 – 18 June 1932
- Succeeded by: Luis Ribas Crehuet

Civil Governor of Gerona
- In office 22 April 1931 – 24 April 1931
- Preceded by: Enrique Izquierdo
- Succeeded by: Jaime Simó

Albert de Quintana de León (5 October 1890 – 18 June 1932) was a Spanish lawyer, politician, and sports leader. Politically, he was the provincial deputy for Gerona in 1918 and 1921, and during the Second Spanish Republic, he was civil governor of Girona and deputy of ERC in the parliament in 1931 and 1932. He is best known, however, for being the first president of Girona FC from 1930 until he died in 1932.

== Early life and education ==
Albert de Quintana de León was born on 5 October 1890 in Girona into a family of agricultural owners from Torroella de Montgrí, which had several prominent members in politics, literature, and law, such as his grandfather Alberto de Quintana Combis and cousin Alberto de Quintana Vergés, also politicians, this last linked to the CEDA. During his grandfather's last term as overseas minister, he went to Cuba, where his eldest son, Pompeyo de Quintana y Serra (1858–1939), married in 1889 Flora de León y Dorticós, niece of the island's captain general and when the Quintanas returned to the Empordà, this couple had an only child: Albert.

In 1892, when he had just turned two years old, his mother died. Albert maintained a certain relationship with his maternal family, which included the Dukes of Hornachuelos and the Marquises of Marín, although during his childhood he rather received the political influences and literary interests of his paternal family. A family friend said years later that Albert inherited "the finesse, culture and talent" of the Quintanas, but that he was also "more open, more democratic and more liberal".

In 1897, his father and uncle moved to Girona to practice as lawyers. In this city, young Albert was a student at the municipal school, run by the well-known teacher and publisher Josep Dalmau i Carles, and then at the Provincial Institute. In 1907, the 17-year-old Quintana de León obtained his bachelor's degree and also in the same year, his father remarried Elisa Alemán i Cabrera. Between 1907 and 1912, he studied law at the University of Barcelona, and in 1912–13, he completed and obtained his degree at the University of Granada, taking possession of the corresponding title in April 1914.

== Politic career ==
=== First steps ===
During his time in Barcelona, Quintana de León came into contact with republican Catalanism and particularly with Pere Coromines i Montanya, who strongly influenced him: he was a passerby in his law office, followed him at the Republican Nationalist Centre and then in the Republican Nationalist Federal Union (UFNR) and collaborated in its organ, El Poble Català during the period in which Coromines directed it. From 1910 he began to stand out for his interventions as a lecturer in political events, and in 1912, he momentarily supported the reformism of Melquíades Álvarez.

In 1914, Quintana de León began an intense activity as a lawyer. He often met at the Girona Court with his father and uncle, who were also practicing lawyers, and soon showed his skills as a brilliant orator. In 1916, he married Josefina Cuenca Pérez in Barcelona, with Pere Coromines as godfather. The couple, who could not have children, lived in a central apartment in Girona, which also served as a law firm.

=== Deputy ===
In March 1914, Quintana de León presented himself as a republican candidate in the elections for deputies for the district of Torroella de Montgrí, which his grandfather and father had also represented years ago. In his declaration of political principles, he still presented himself as close to the reformism led by Álvarez, but he distanced himself from it by affirming his republicanism and Catalanism. Despite getting good results, he did not get the seat.

Quintana de León later joined the Catalan Republican Party, and with this party, he was elected provincial deputy for Girona in 1918 and 1921. Between his presentation as a candidate for Courts in 1914 and his election as a provincial deputy in 1918, a political evolution followed that definitively moved him away from reformism to get close for a time to the Radical Republican Party and finally to the Catalan Republican Party, around 1918. During these years, he participated in political events with Lluís Companys, Marcelino Domingo, Francesc Layret, and Alejandro Lerroux. In the summer of 1918, he presented himself as a republican candidate in the partial provincial election that was called to fill a vacancy in La Bisbal d'Empordà district and won the election. In the provincial elections of June 1921, he repeated the election for the same district and won again, holding the position of provincial deputy of Girona until the beginning of 1924, with the governmental cessation of all deputies ordered by the Dictatorship of Primo de Rivera. He was a member of the Provincial Commission in the mandates of 1920–21 and 1923–24 (this one, interrupted), the second deputy secretary (1919–20) and first (1922–23) and, as such, a member of the Central Commission. As a deputy of Girona, he was also a member of the Assembly of the Commonwealth of Catalonia, in both institutions as a member of the republican minority, then the Catalanist republican, doing so in close collaboration with Josep Irla, who was also a deputy for the Bisbal d'Empordà.

In the Commonwealth, Quintana de León was part of several commissions, among them the one for Agriculture in 1918, as well as Culture from 1919 to 1924, and he was also a member of the governing board of the Girona Charities. As a member of the Commonwealth's Assembly, he was very active and intervened in a multitude of issues: project of the Statute of Autonomy, replacement of the provincial contingent, budgets, rejection of government repression in Barcelona, organization of the Catalan notary, creation of educational facilities, extension of sport, reorganization of charity services, tribute to Catalan volunteers in the First World War, support for Irish during its War of Independence (1919–1921), request to end the Rif War in Morocco (1920–1927).

In April 1923, Quintana de León presented himself as a Catalan republican candidate in the general elections for the district of Figueres, in a controversial election since he denounced before the Provincial Court the serious irregularities committed by the monarchist candidate and by the civil governor himself, but the seat was awarded to his opponent. In the same summer of 1923, he was one of the drivers of the union between various local groups of republican Catalanism, which culminated in the creation of the Partit Republicana Federal Nacionalista de les Comarques Gironines (PRFN). Quintana, Irla, and also Miquel Santaló appeared there as deputies of the Commonwealth and became part of the directory of the new party, together with other personalities of Girona's republicanism. The new party, however, soon saw its action interrupted by the arrival of the Primo de Rivera Dictatorship.

=== Performance during the Dictatorship and the Republic ===
During the Dictatorship of Primo de Rivera, Quintana de León had to limit his political activity and concentrate on his professional activity as a lawyer, holding the position of first deputy (vice dean) of the Girona Bar Association in 1930. In mid-1930 and taking advantage of a certain openness of the dictatorial regime, the PRFN began its reorganization, with Quintana as one of the members of the directory. He collaborated with the newspaper El Autonomista, the spokesperson for Republicanism in Girona, and when the Second Spanish Republic was proclaimed on 22 April 1931, he took part in the proclamation of the Republic in Girona, becoming the new civil governor of the province. However, he occupied the position for only two days, intending to contribute to a peaceful transition to the new republican regime and, once this objective was achieved, he ceased to be in office.

Quintana de León also participated in the founding of Republican Left of Catalonia, a party with which he was elected deputy for the province of Girona in the 1931 Spanish general election. In those elections, he was part of the Republican Left Candidacy, representing the PRFN affiliated with ERC, which won an important victory. As a deputy, he was a very active member of the Left parliamentary group, making numerous parliamentary interventions and showing the constituents his skills as a speaker. He intervened in matters of interest to the constituency, such as the tariff duties established by France on the import of manufactured corks, but also in the major political reforms promoted by the Republic, which he faced from his position as a jurist. As a member of the Justice Commission, he worked thoroughly on the parliamentary processing of the Divorce Law and submitted two separate votes in this regard, which better defined the role of lawyers and the judicial process, which with nuances were incorporated into the final text.

== Writing career ==
Throughout his life, Quintana de León collaborated in El Poble Català, La Publicitat and El Día Gráfico in Barcelona, El Autonomista in Girona, and El Sol in Madrid.

== Social life ==
Following the family path, Quintana de León intervened thoroughly in Girona's cultural life. He had several initiatives in the fields of education and culture, especially concerning the creation of new equipment and the restoration of monuments in the regions of Girona. With his wife, they attended theatrical performances, literary evenings, and musical performances. He had some literary productions, such as the theatrical arrangement of a play by Miquel de Palol. He promoted the popular auditions of Sardanas in Girona, was honorary president of the province's Orchestra Union, and had an intense activity as a lecturer in the associative network of Girona's counties.

In 1920 the Banc de Catalunya, which included his personal friend Pere Coromines on its board of directors, opened its branch in Girona, and Quintana went on to occupy the position of secretary of the governing council of this delegation, which was to serve as a base for him to actively intervene in its expansion in the regions of Girona between 1929 and 1930.

== Sporting life ==
Quintana de León was also interested in the extension of sport in Catalonia, especially from organizations with a Catalan profile; for instance, he was linked from a very young age to both the Empordà Games and the Girona Floral Games, being a member of the jury in the latter's 1920 edition and president of its council the following year.

On 23 July 1930, Quintana de León was one of the members of the group of enthusiasts that founded the Girona Futbol Club at the historic meeting in Cafè Norat de la Rambla, from the dissolved Unió Deportiva Girona, and he was elected as its first president. On 1 August, the City Council of Girona authorized the club to make use of the city's emblem on its badges. Under his leadership, the board agreed with the Catalan Football Federation to include Girona in the planned expansion of the second division of the Catalan championship, playing its first match against Colónia Artigas.

The board of directors was determined to carry out "a sporting work from Girona, scrupulously democratic and clean of all mercantilism". The fans, who were asked to pay an extraordinary and voluntary fee of at least 2 pesetas to "cover the considerable expenses arising from the competition", made it their own, which led to the renaissance of football in the city. Girona's first squad was built with the footballers linked to the old UD Girona, and three-quarters of the dressing room was from the youth team to reduce the import of players, who received neither salaries nor fixed bonuses, with the club only allocated a modest percentage to them at the end of each match that, according to the local press, "were kept exemplary in a collective book of the Caixa d'Estalvis.

== Death ==
In June 1932, when he was only 41 years old and in full parliamentary activity, Quintana de León fell seriously ill, due to sepsis from meningitis. Settled in Madrid's Clínica del Rosario, he was assisted by his wife and the deputy Margarita Nelken, who were joined by his father, Pompeu de Quintana, and numerous personalities and friends, such as Miquel Santaló, Pere Coromines, and many others. Despite the efforts of the medical team, he died suddenly. At the time of his untimely death, he was preparing the defense of the Statute of Catalonia.

His body was transferred to Barcelona, where he received the first expressions of condolence. A car caravan was then formed, with the president Francesc Macià, the councilor Ventura Gassol, and numerous authorities and friends, which accompanied him to Girona. In his city, a procession was formed on foot, which traveled through the streets amid popular commotion, with town halls and republican houses showing their flags at half-mast. The caravan then accompanied him to Torroella de Montgrí. He was buried in the family cemetery, in the middle of persistent rain, with the assistance of Macià, Gassol, and hundreds of friends at all times.
