= Miquel Olmo =

Spanish footballer and manager

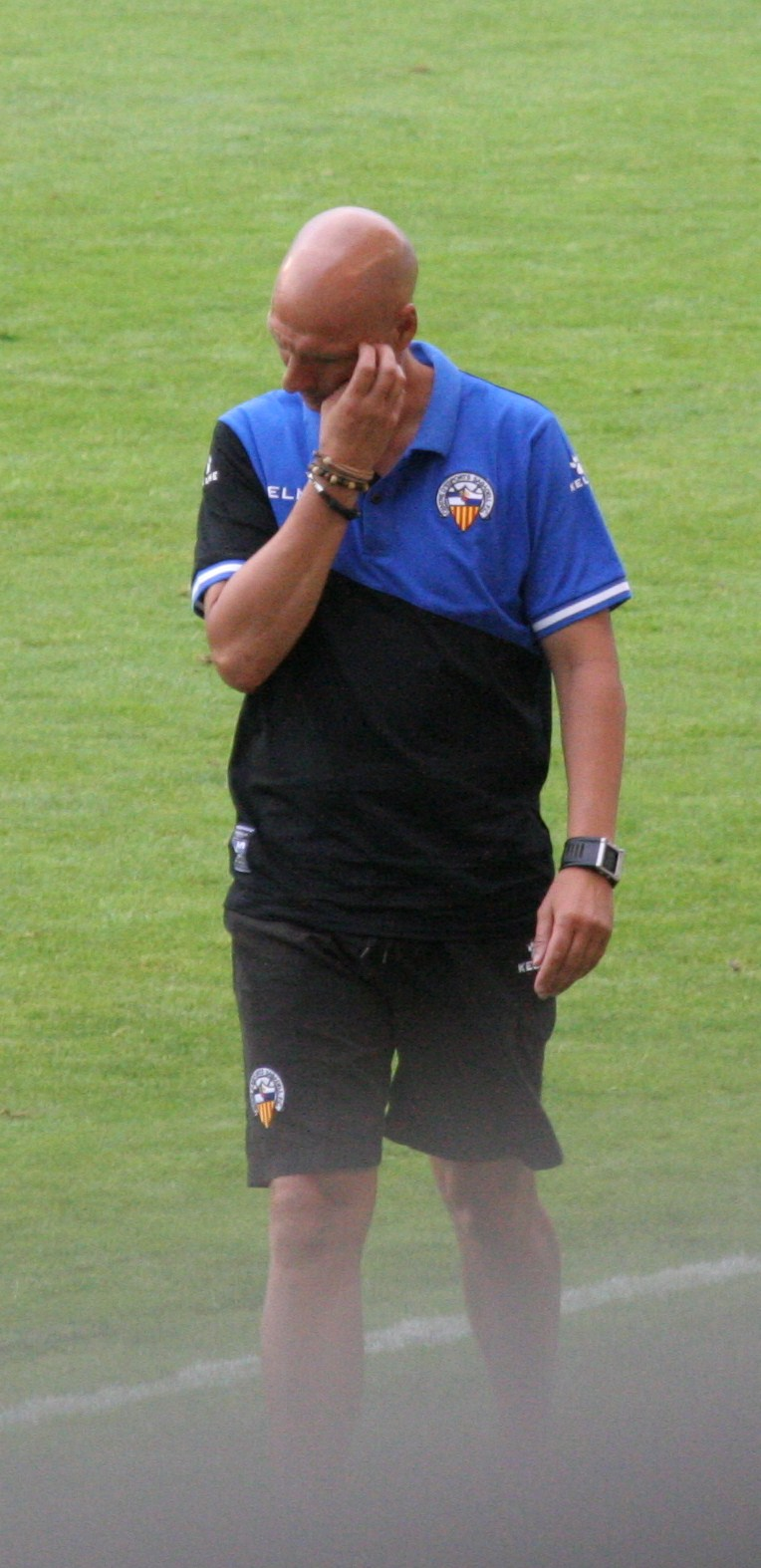
- Olmo in August 2014.

Personal information
- Full name: Miquel Olmo Forte
- Date of birth: 20 January 1966 (age 60)
- Place of birth: Terrassa, Spain
- Position: Forward

Youth career
- Terrassa

Senior career*
Years	Team	Apps	(Gls)
1984–1988	Terrassa		
1986–1987	→ Sariñena (loan)	14	(3)
1988–1989	Vilafranca		
1989–1990	Gavà	8	(0)
1990–1992	Premià		
1992–1994	Calafell		
1994–1995	Júpiter	26	(6)
1995–1996	Rubí		
1996–1997	Granollers		
1997	Sant Cugat		
1997–1998	Poble Sec		

Managerial career
- 2001–2003: Can Perellada
- 2003–2004: Montcada
- 2004–2005: Vilassar Mar
- 2005–2006: Figueres
- 2006–2008: Castelldefels
- 2009: Girona
- 2009–2012: Terrassa
- 2013: Sabadell (assistant)
- 2013–2014: Sabadell
- 2015: Manama Club
- * Club domestic league appearances and goals

Miquel Olmo Forte (born 20 January 1966) is a Spanish retired footballer who played as a forward, and a current manager.

== Club career ==
Born in Terrassa, Barcelona, Catalonia, Olmo played for lower league teams always in his native region, most notably representing Terrassa FC and CF Gavà. He retired in 1998, aged 32, playing for UE Poble Sec.

== Manager career ==
Olmo began his managerial career at lowly CD Can Perallada and subsequently managed neighbours CD Montcada and UE Vilassar de Mar, before moving to Segunda División B's UE Figueres in the 2005 summer. He helped the Unió to narrowly avoid relegation, finishing 14th.

On 4 June 2009, after a stint at UE Castelldefels, Olmo replaced Javi Salamero at the helm of Girona FC. He remained in charge for the last three matches of the campaign, helping the Albirrojos retain their Segunda División status.

On 25 September 2009 Olmo was appointed Terrassa FC's manager, replacing fired José Luis García. However, he finished the season as dead last, being relegated to Tercera División. He remained on the bench in the following years, leaving the club in May 2012.

On 5 July 2013, Olmo was named Salamero's assistant at CE Sabadell FC. On 28 November, after Salamero's dismissal, Olmo was appointed caretaker manager.

After taking the Arlequinats out of the relegation places, Olmo renewed his deal with the club on 8 May 2014. He was dismissed on 23 November.

On 24 July 2015 Olmo was appointed manager of Bahrain's Manama Club. He was relieved from his duties on 29 October.

== Personal life ==
Olmo's sons, Carlos and Dani, also became footballers. Carlos played in the lower leagues of Croatia for teams including GNK Dinamo Zagreb's reserves, while Dani played for their first team, currently plays for FC Barcelona and has been capped internationally for Spain, playing a key role in Spain’s Euro 2024 and FIFA World Cup 2026 title-winning runs.
