= Vicenç Sasot =

Spanish footballer and manager

Personal information
- Full name: Vicenç Sasot Fraucà
- Date of birth: 21 January 1918
- Place of birth: Peñalba, Spain
- Date of death: 12 April 1985 (aged 67)
- Position: Defender

Youth career
- Barcelona

Senior career*
Years	Team	Apps	(Gls)
1939–1942	Valladolid	41	(1)
1942–1944	Sabadell	11	(0)
1944–1952	Sans		

Managerial career
- 1956–1957: Lleida
- 1961–1962: Condal
- 1964–1965: Barcelona
- 1966–1967: Condal
- 1968–1969: Mallorca
- 1969–1970: Calvo Sotelo
- 1970–1971: Calella
- 1972–1974: Girona
- 1974–1975: Lleida
- 1975–1976: Atlético Baleares
- 1979–1980: Girona
- * Club domestic league appearances and goals

Vicenç Sasot Fraucà (21 January 1918 – 12 April 1985) was a Spanish football player and manager.

== Career ==
Born in Peñalba, Sasot played as a defender for Sabadell. He also managed Barcelona, Condal, Mallorca and Calvo Sotelo.
