= Pablo Villa =

Spanish footballer and coach

Personal information
- Full name: Pablo Villanueva Fernández
- Date of birth: 12 April 1976 (age 50)
- Place of birth: Alcorcón, Spain
- Height: 1.83 m (6 ft 0 in)
- Position: Forward

Team information
- Current team: Aston Villa (assistant)

Youth career
- Trival Valderas
- Real Madrid

Senior career*
| Years | Team | Apps | (Gls) |
| 1995–1997 | Real Madrid C | 60 | (20) |
| 1997–2001 | Real Madrid B | 71 | (20) |
| 2000–2001 | → Racing Ferrol (loan) | 27 | (3) |
| 2001–2003 | Leganés | 80 | (9) |
| 2003–2007 | Córdoba | 95 | (15) |
| 2007–2009 | Guadalajara | 72 | (10) |
| Total | | 405 | (77) |

Managerial career
- 2010–2012: Trival Valderas (youth)
- 2012–2013: Córdoba B
- 2013–2014: Córdoba
- * Club domestic league appearances and goals

Pablo Villanueva Fernández (born 12 April 1976), known as Villa, is a Spanish former professional footballer who played as a forward. He is currently assistant manager of Premier League club Aston Villa.

== Playing career ==
Born in Alcorcón, Community of Madrid, Villa finished his development with Real Madrid, making his senior debut with the C team in the Segunda División B after being recruited to the academy by Vicente del Bosque. Also during the 1996–97 campaign, he was promoted to the reserves who competed in the Segunda División, his first professional appearance occurring on 2 March 1997 in a 0–2 home loss against Las Palmas where he played the full 90 minutes.

Villa spent the following five seasons in the second division, starting out with a loan at Racing de Ferrol. Subsequently, he represented Leganés and Córdoba, scoring a career-best eight goals (with the professionals) in 2004–05 for the latter side but being relegated.

Villa retired in 2009 at the age of 33 after a spell with Guadalajara, due to knee problems.

== Coaching career ==
Villa started working as a manager at amateurs Trival Valderas, being in charge of its youth squads. In June 2012, he was appointed manager of Córdoba B, replacing Rafael Berges who took the reins of the first team. He finished the season in second place in the Tercera División, being ousted in the play-offs by Granada B who were eventually promoted.

Villa was named coach of Córdoba on 27 June 2013, with the club still in the second tier. He was relieved of his duties on 9 February of the following year, due to poor results.

Starting in the summer of 2014, Villa worked with compatriot Unai Emery at several teams. His first one was Sevilla, followed by Paris Saint-Germain, Arsenal, Villarreal and Aston Villa.

== Managerial statistics ==
As of match played 25 October 2016

Managerial record by team and tenure
| Team | Nat | From | To | Record | | | | | | | |
| Team | Nat | From | To | G | W | D | L | GF | GA | GD | Win % |
|---|---|---|---|---|---|---|---|---|---|---|---|
| Córdoba B | (Spain) | 22 June 2012 | 27 June 2013 | 42 | 23 | 13 | 6 | 63 | 24 | +39 | 54.76 |
| Córdoba | (Spain) | 27 June 2013 | 9 February 2014 | 26 | 9 | 8 | 9 | 30 | 30 | +0 | 34.62 |
| Total | | | | 68 | 32 | 21 | 15 | 93 | 54 | +39 | 47.06 |
