= Paco Bonachera =

Spanish football manager

Personal information
- Full name: Francisco Martínez Bonachera
- Date of birth: 9 January 1950 (age 76)
- Place of birth: Almería, Spain

Managerial career
- Years: Team
- 1981–1984: Manresa
- 1984–1985: Europa
- 1985–1986: Vilafranca
- 1986–1987: Vic
- 1987–1991: Blanes
- 1991–1993: Gramenet
- 1993: Girona
- 1993–1995: Gramenet
- 1995–1996: Castellón
- 1996–1997: Andorra
- 1997: Lleida
- 1997–1998: Gimnàstic
- 1999–2000: Gramenet
- 2002–2003: Lleida

Francisco "Paco" Martínez Bonachera (born 9 January 1950), is a Spanish football coach.

== Managerial career ==
Born in Almería, Andalusia, Bonachera spent his whole career in Catalonia. After starting out at CE Manresa, he enjoyed short spells at Tercera División sides CE Europa and FC Vilafranca before taking charge of CD Blanes in 1987.

In 1993 Bonachera first arrived in Segunda División B, after being appointed at the helm of Girona FC. He continued to manage in the category in the following years, with UDA Gramenet, CD Castellón and FC Andorra.

In January 1997 Bonachera was named UE Lleida manager in Segunda División, until the end of the season. He subsequently returned to the third tier after his contract expired, being appointed at Gimnàstic de Tarragona.

In the 1999 summer Bonachera returned to Gramenet. He was sacked by the club in the following year, and was appointed manager of former club Lleida in April 2002.
