= Pere Guardiola =

Spanish football agent

Pere Guardiola Sala (born 16 July 1976) is a Spanish businessman and agent who is the President of the Board of Director of Girona and younger brother of the former Manchester City manager Pep Guardiola. Both of these clubs are owned and members of City Football Group.

== Agent career ==
In 2009, Guardiola founded football agency Media Base Sports. The agency has focused on representing Portuguese and Spanish prospects. He has worked as an agent for Uruguay international Jacob Nunez and Spain international Andrés Iniesta.

He has been regarded as one of the most powerful football agents.

== Girona ==
In 2017, he acquired sixteen percent of shares of Spanish side Girona, before becoming the club's president board of director in 2020. He has combined this position with a position at football agency Sports Entertainment Group. Under him, Girona achieved promotion to the Spanish La Liga.
