= Salvador Hormeu =

Spanish footballer and motorsport people

Personal information
- Birth name: Salvador Hormeu i Gardella
- Date of birth: 18 September 1894
- Place of birth: Girona, Spain
- Date of death: 28 August 1992 (aged 97)
- Place of death: Barcelona, Catalonia, Spain
- Position: Forward

Senior career*
Years	Team	Apps	(Gls)
1909	Sport Empordanès de Figueres	2	(0)
1910–1914	Strong FC		
1914–1918	FC Barcelona		
1919	Canadiense FC		
- * Club domestic league appearances and goals

Salvador Hormeu Gardella (18 September 1894 – 28 August 1992) was a Spanish footballer who played as a forward for some of the earliest Girona clubs and later for FC Barcelona.

== Football career ==
Born in Girona on 18 September 1894, Hormeu began his football career at the newly established Sport Empordanès de Figueres before becoming an active member of the group that founded the first major football club in his hometown Strong FC in 1910. He stood out for his technical quality, the speed to recover balls, and a great long-distance shot, playing in midfield and more advanced positions. He was part of the golden age of Strong, with Francesc Roca, Carles Bellsolà, and Narciso Callicó.

In 1914, Hormeu moved to Barcelona to study medicine and joined the ranks of FC Barcelona, where he began playing for the club's second team. He soon became part of the first team squad, thus becoming the first-ever player from the Girona region to play for the club. At the Blaugrana club, he played inside left, forming the left wing next to Paulino Alcántara. On 17 May 1917, he started for Barça in a friendly against the Catalan national team, helping his side to a 2–1 victory.

In total, he scored 7 goals in 16 official matches, helping his side win the Catalan Championship in the 1915–16 season. He also scored a further 23 goals in 51 friendly matches for Barça, one of which against Madrid FC on 4 November 1917, to help his side to a 4–1 win. During this period, he continued to play and referee matches for the Girona club.

In 1919, Hormeu played with the Canadenca team. After retiring, he became a medical analyst.

== Death ==
Callicó died in Girona on 28 August 1992, at the age of 97.

== Honours ==
FC Barcelona

- Catalan championship
  - Champions (1): 1915–16
