= Girona FC =

Association football club in Spain

Girona
- Full name: Girona Futbol Club, S.A.D.
- Nicknames: Blanquivermells (White and Reds); Gironistes; Tossuts
- Founded: 23 July 1930; 96 years ago
- Stadium: Estadi Montilivi
- Capacity: 14,624
- Owner(s): City Football Group (47%); Marcelo Claure (35%); Girona Football Group (16%); Others (2%)
- President: Delfí Geli
- Head coach: Quique Álvarez
- League: Segunda División
- 2025–26: La Liga, 19th of 20 (relegated)
- Website: gironafc.cat
Home colours	Away colours	Third colours

Clubs owned by CFG Listed in order of acquisition/foundation. Bold indicates the club was founded by CFG. * indicates the club was acquired by CFG. § indicates the club is co-owned. † indicates the club is no longer owned by CFG.
2008	(England) Manchester City*
2009–2012
2013	(United States) **New York City FC**^{§}
2014	(Australia) Melbourne City*
2014	(Japan) Yokohama F. Marinos*^{†}
2015–2016
2017	(Uruguay) Montevideo City*
2017	(Spain) Girona*^{§}
2018
2019	(China) Shenzhen Peng City*^{§}
2019	(India) Mumbai City^{†}
2020	(Belgium) Lommel*
2020	(France) Troyes*
2021
2022	(Italy) Palermo*^{§}
2023	(Brazil) Bahia*^{§}

Girona Futbol Club, S.A.D. (Catalan: [ʒiˈɾonə] zhi-RO-nuh) is a Spanish professional football club based in Girona, Catalonia, Spain. Founded on 23 July 1930, the team plays in the Segunda División, following relegation from the 2025–26 La Liga season.

Girona holds its home matches at the 14,624-capacity Estadi Montilivi. It is a part of City Football Group Limited. The club also has youth and amateur women's teams for competition.

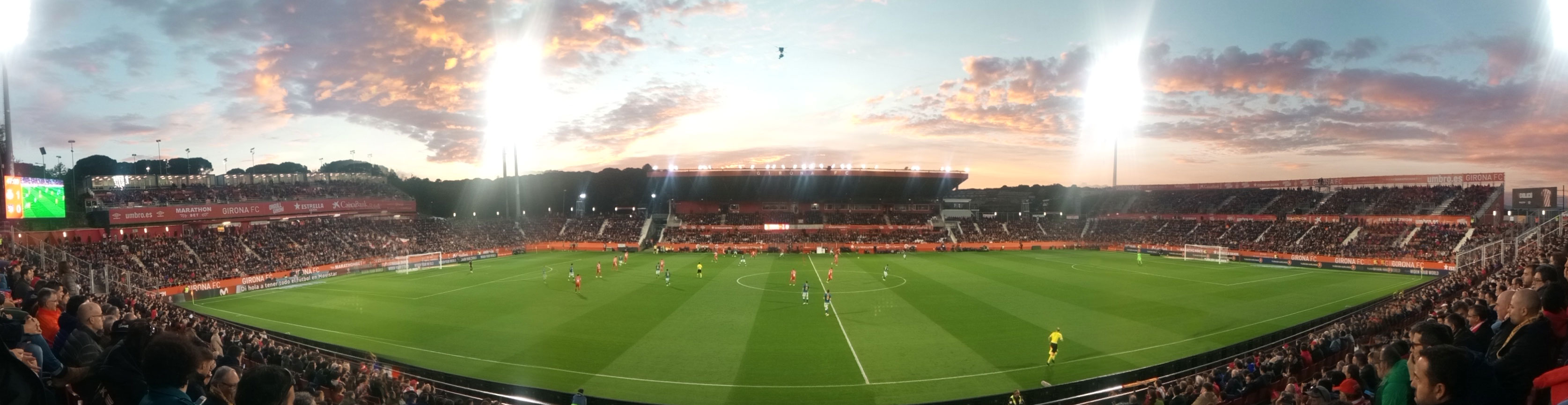
Girona FC home stadium Estadi Montilivi.

== History ==
Football became of particular interest in Girona at the beginning of the 20th century. The first major club in the city was Strong Esport (founded in 1902 under the original name of FC Gerundense). Some of the team's first players were Narciso Callicó and Salvador Hormeu, both of whom went on to play for FC Barcelona. In the 1920s, football gained strength with clubs such as CE Gironí, founded in 1921, but above all by Unió Deportiva Girona, founded on 13 February of the same year, when the elements united of the Sports Center Gironenc, heirs of the dissolved Strong, with other sports enthusiasts. The club soon became the strongest in the city. UD Girona, however, disappeared in 1929 due to financial problems, following a debt of around 200,000 pesetas (a real fortune for those times). After the disappearance of the UD Girona it was decided to create a new football team in the city.

On 23 July 1930, in the café Norat in La Rambla of Girona, Girona Futbol Club was founded upon the dissolution of Unió Esportiva Girona for economic reasons. On 1 August 1930, the city council authorized the club so that it could use the city's emblem on its badges. It was achieved thanks to the efforts of enthusiasts led by the club's first president Albert de Quintana de León. The team subsequently entered in the second division of the Catalan Championships. Its first official match was against Colònia Artigas with the lineup: Florenza, Teixidor, Farró, Flavià, Comas, Corradi, Ferrer, Escuder, Clara, Torrellas and Taradellas.

1935–36 was the first season Girona played in Segunda División, and the club finished in top position in its group, subsequently appearing in the playoff stage against Celta de Vigo, Real Zaragoza, Arenas Club, Real Murcia and Xerez, but finishing second from bottom, thus out of the La Liga promotion zone.

Chart of Girona FC league performance 1929–present

After the Spanish Civil War, the club fluctuated between the second level and Tercera División, falling into the latter category in 1959 and being further demoted in 1980 – Segunda División B was created as the new division three in 1977, and the club lasted three years in the competition. In 1968, construction of the Estadi Montilivi began, with home matches being held there on a permanent basis from 1970 onwards after nearly five decades at the Vista Alegre stadium.

In the following decades, Girona alternated between the third and the fourth divisions, even spending three seasons in the regional championships, in 1982–83 and 1997–99. On 16 June 2008, after defeating Ceuta 1–0 in the play-offs, the Raül Agné-led side achieved a second consecutive promotion, returning to the second tier after a 49-year absence.

On 22 July 2010, a group of local businessmen led by Ramon Vilaró, Joaquim Boadas and Josep Slim purchased 72% of the club's shares, previously held by former club president Josep Gusó and Josep Rofes, thus becoming the new owners of Girona. Vilaró was elected the new president while Agné, after a spell with Recreativo, returned as manager for the upcoming second division campaign, lasting in the position until 14 January 2012 when he was sacked following a 0–3 loss at Recreativo.

In 2011, Girona created a reserve team, having previously grown a natural grass pitch in Palau. On 9 May 2013, the club's board of directors, under the slogan "El Girona FC també és meu" ("Girona FC is mine too"), approved an increase of the club's capital in €300,000 to be distributed in €10 shares, aiming to balance its estate.

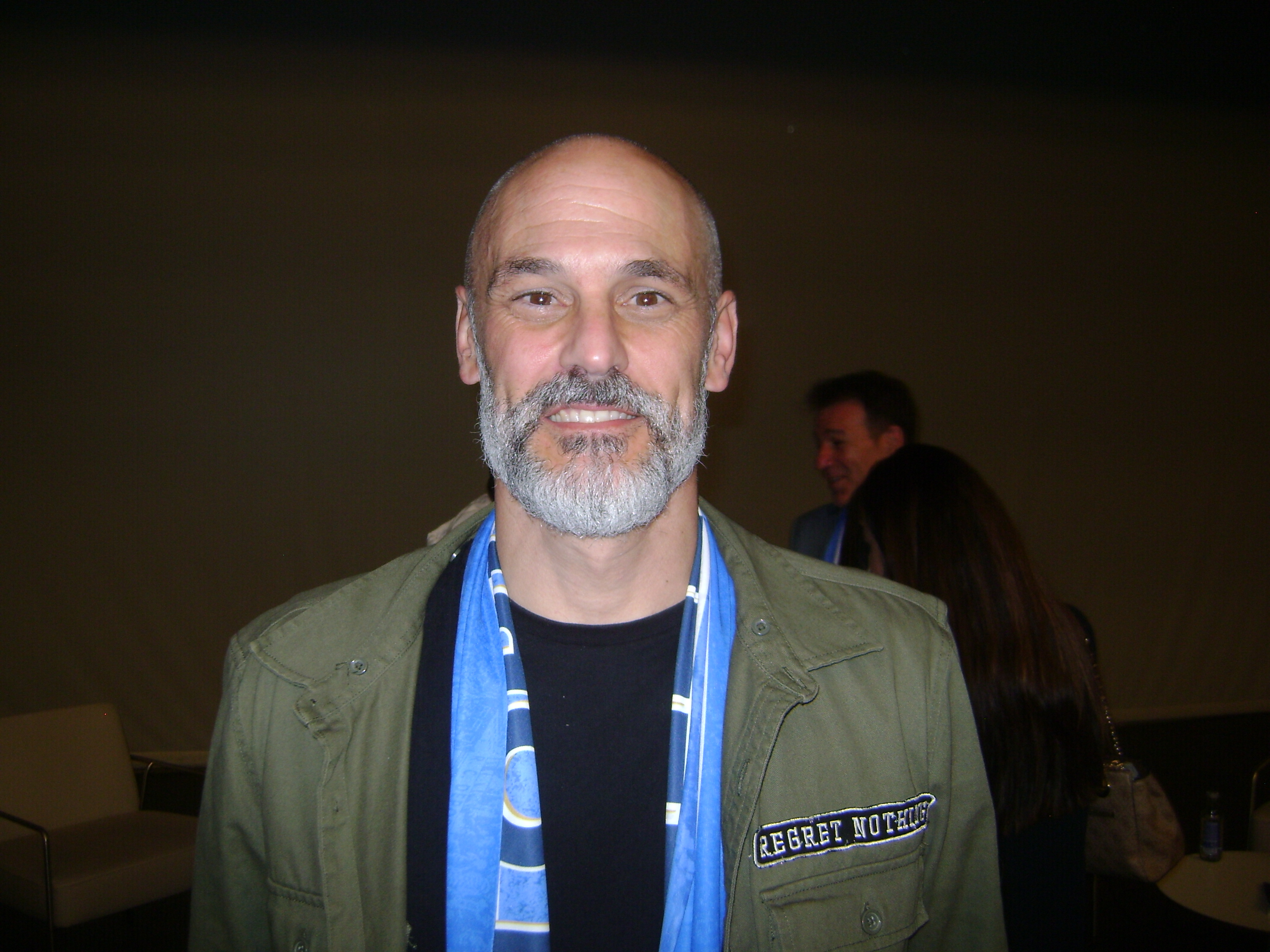
Goalkeeper Dani Mallo played in Girona between 2009 and 2013.

On the last matchday of the 2014–15 season, Girona needed to beat Lugo at home to earn promotion to La Liga, but were denied by a last-minute goal by the visitors. Girona had to settle for a play-off place, but were eliminated in the semi-finals by Real Zaragoza, despite winning the first leg 3–0. The next season, they reached the play-off final but were defeated by Osasuna. Girona finally earned promotion to La Liga after the 2016–17 season as they finished runners-up to Levante. This was the first time that Girona had ever been promoted to La Liga in their 87-year history.

On 23 August 2017, it was announced City Football Group (CFG), a subsidiary of Abu Dhabi United Group, had purchased 44.3% ownership in Girona. Another 44.3% was held by Girona Football Group, led by Pere Guardiola, the brother of CFG-owned Manchester City manager Pep Guardiola. On 29 October 2017, Girona recorded a memorable victory, defeating reigning Champions League winners Real Madrid 2–1.

On the last match day of the 2018–19 La Liga season, Girona were relegated to Segunda Division, after losing 2–1 against Deportivo Alavés, ending their two-year spell in the Spanish top tier. In the 2021–22 season Girona finished sixth in the Segunda Division and were promoted to La Liga in the play-offs, beating Tenerife 3–1 on aggregate in the final. In the 2022–23 season they finished 10th with 49 points, four points away from a UEFA Europa Conference League play-off spot.

In the 2023–24 season, Girona reached the top four of La Liga for the first time after two matches, soon reaching the top of the La Liga table after seven matches with 19 points, the club's best-ever start in top flight football. On 10 December 2023, they defeated FC Barcelona in the league for the first time, a 2–4 away victory taking them to the top of the table with 41 points and just one defeat, their best ever record in La Liga after just 16 rounds. On 5 February 2024, they sat second in the La Liga table, with 56 points from 23 games, and with only a single loss, placing them two points behind Real Madrid. On 4 May 2024, Girona achieved a 4–2 victory over Barcelona, securing their first qualification to the UEFA Champions League and its first European qualification and finished the season in third place with 81 points.

In the 2024–25 season, Girona played their first competitive international match against French side Paris Saint-Germain in a 1–0 loss at the Parc des Princes on 18 September. David López converted Girona's first international goal when he scored the opening goal of a 2–3 loss against Dutch-side Feyenoord on 2 October.

In the 2025–26 season, Girona were relegated to the second division after failing to win a match against Elche on the last matchday, ending a four-year stay in top tier.

== Training centre ==
The club's new training facilities have been under construction since December 2017, located at the PGA Catalunya Golf Course complex to the south of Girona. Occupying an area of 20,000 m^{2} (220,000 sq ft), the new complex will serve as the exclusive training centre of the club for the next 3 1/2 years. It will be home to a 110 m × 72 m (361 ft × 236 ft) training pitch of hybrid grass as well as a 160 m × 72 m (525 ft × 236 ft) pitch of natural grass, in addition to indoor training facilities.

== Season to season ==
Season	Tier	Division	Place	Copa del Rey
1933–34	3	3ª	1st	
1934–35	2	2ª	4th	Third round
1935–36	2	2ª	1st	Round of 16
1939–40	2	2ª	3rd	First round
1940–41	2	2ª	4th	Third round
1941–42	2	2ª	5th	
1942–43	2	2ª	6th	
1943–44	3	3ª	5th	Second round
1944–45	3	3ª	3rd	
1945–46	3	3ª	6th	
1946–47	3	3ª	4th	
1947–48	3	3ª	1st	Third round
1948–49	2	2ª	10th	Round of 16
1949–50	2	2ª	9th	Third round
1950–51	2	2ª	16th	
1951–52	3	3ª	6th	
1952–53	3	3ª	8th	
1953–54	3	3ª	2nd	
1954–55	3	3ª	1st	
1955–56	3	3ª	2nd	

Season	Tier	Division	Place	Copa del Rey
1956–57	2	2ª	9th	
1957–58	2	2ª	9th	
1958–59	2	2ª	15th	First round
1959–60	3	3ª	11th	
1960–61	3	3ª	4th	
1961–62	3	3ª	2nd	
1962–63	3	3ª	4th	
1963–64	3	3ª	6th	
1964–65	3	3ª	7th	
1965–66	3	3ª	7th	
1966–67	3	3ª	3rd	
1967–68	3	3ª	8th	
1968–69	3	3ª	11th	
1969–70	3	3ª	3rd	Second round
1970–71	3	3ª	2nd	First round
1971–72	3	3ª	8th	First round
1972–73	3	3ª	2nd	Second round
1973–74	3	3ª	3rd	First round
1974–75	3	3ª	6th	Second round
1975–76	3	3ª	3rd	First round

Season	Tier	Division	Place	Copa del Rey
1976–77	3	3ª	2nd	Third round
1977–78	3	2ª B	6th	Third round
1978–79	3	2ª B	13th	Third round
1979–80	3	2ª B	19th	First round
1980–81	4	3ª	7th	
1981–82	4	3ª	18th	
1982–83	5	Reg. Pref.	1st	
1983–84	4	3ª	9th	
1984–85	4	3ª	7th	
1985–86	4	3ª	2nd	
1986–87	4	3ª	7th	First round
1987–88	3	2ª B	19th	
1988–89	4	3ª	1st	First round
1989–90	3	2ª B	12th	
1990–91	3	2ª B	7th	Second round
1991–92	3	2ª B	3rd	
1992–93	3	2ª B	15th	Third round
1993–94	3	2ª B	15th	First round
1994–95	3	2ª B	18th	First round
1995–96	4	3ª	13th	

Season	Tier	Division	Place	Copa del Rey
1996–97	4	3ª	19th	
1997–98	5	1ª Cat.	5th	
1998–99	5	1ª Cat.	1st	
1999–2000	4	3ª	7th	
2000–01	4	3ª	8th	
2001–02	4	3ª	9th	
2002–03	4	3ª	2nd	
2003–04	3	2ª B	7th	
2004–05	3	2ª B	17th	Round of 32
2005–06	4	3ª	1st	
2006–07	4	3ª	2nd	First round
2007–08	3	2ª B	1st	
2008–09	2	2ª	16th	Third round
2009–10	2	2ª	14th	Third round
2010–11	2	2ª	11th	Second round
2011–12	2	2ª	15th	Second round
2012–13	2	2ª	4th	Second round
2013–14	2	2ª	15th	Round of 32
2014–15	2	2ª	3rd	Third round
2015–16	2	2ª	4th	Second round

Season	Tier	Division	Place	Copa del Rey
2016–17	2	2ª	2nd	Second round
2017–18	1	1ª	10th	Round of 32
2018–19	1	1ª	18th	Quarter-finals
2019–20	2	2ª	5th	Round of 32
2020–21	2	2ª	5th	Round of 16
2021–22	2	2ª	6th	Round of 16
2022–23	1	1ª	10th	Second round
2023–24	1	1ª	3rd	Quarter-finals
2024–25	1	1ª	16th	Second round
2025–26	1	1ª	19th	Second round
2026–27	2	2ª		TBD

- **6** seasons in La Liga
- **25** seasons in Segunda División
- **13** seasons in Segunda División B
- **44** seasons in Tercera División
- **3** seasons in Categorías Regionales

== European record ==
Season	Competition	Round	Opponent	Home	Away	Aggregate
2024–25	UEFA Champions League	League phase	(France) Paris Saint-Germain	—N/a	0–1	33rd
2024–25	UEFA Champions League	League phase	(Netherlands) Feyenoord	2–3	—N/a	33rd
2024–25	UEFA Champions League	League phase	(Slovakia) Slovan Bratislava	2–0	—N/a	33rd
2024–25	UEFA Champions League	League phase	(Netherlands) PSV Eindhoven	—N/a	0–4	33rd
2024–25	UEFA Champions League	League phase	(Austria) Sturm Graz	—N/a	0–1	33rd
2024–25	UEFA Champions League	League phase	(England) Liverpool	0–1	—N/a	33rd
2024–25	UEFA Champions League	League phase	(Italy) Milan	—N/a	0–1	33rd
2024–25	UEFA Champions League	League phase	(England) Arsenal	1–2	—N/a	33rd

== Players ==
=== First team squad ===
As of 3 September 2026

Note: Flags indicate national team as defined under FIFA eligibility rules; some limited exceptions apply. Players may hold more than one non-FIFA nationality.

No.	Pos.	Nation	Player
1	GK	ESP	Sergi Puig
2	DF	GHA	Abdul Mumin
3	DF	ESP	Mateu Morey
4	DF	ESP	Javier Boñar
5	DF	ESP	David López
6	MF	NED	Donny van de Beek
7	FW	URU	Cristhian Stuani (captain)
8	MF	ESP	Fran Beltrán
9	FW	ESP	Abel Ruiz
10	FW	ESP	Portu (vice-captain)
11	DF	ESP	Àlex Moreno
13	GK	ARG	Paulo Gazzaniga
14	MF	ESP	Iván Morante

No.	Pos.	Nation	Player
15	FW	UKR	Oleksandr Pyshchur
16	DF	ESP	Alejandro Francés
17	FW	ESP	Bryan Gil
19	FW	UKR	Vladyslav Vanat
21	FW	POR	Jastin García
22	FW	COL	Yáser Asprilla
23	FW	ESP	Carles Pérez
24	MF	ESP	Izan González
25	GK	UKR	Vladyslav Krapyvtsov
30	MF	ESP	Unai Hernández (on loan from Al-Ittihad)
33	DF	POR	Mauro Furtado
38	DF	ESP	Holmes Junior

=== Reserve team ===
Note: Flags indicate national team as defined under FIFA eligibility rules; some limited exceptions apply. Players may hold more than one non-FIFA nationality.

No.	Pos.	Nation	Player
28	DF	ESP	Gibi Jordana
29	MF	GUI	Lass Kourouma
32	FW	VEN	Juan Arango
35	FW	MAR	Mohamed Hamony

No.	Pos.	Nation	Player
36	MF	ESP	Javi Sarasa
39	DF	ESP	Guillem Badia
44	GK	ESP	Jordi Danso

=== Out on loan ===
Note: Flags indicate national team as defined under FIFA eligibility rules; some limited exceptions apply. Players may hold more than one non-FIFA nationality.

No.	Pos.	Nation	Player
—	DF	HUN	Antal Yaakobishvili (at Atlético Madrileño until 30 June 2027)
—	MF	NED	Gabriel Misehouy (at NAC Breda until 30 June 2027)
—	FW	ESP	Carles Garrido (at Sant Andreu until 30 June 2027)

No.	Pos.	Nation	Player
—	FW	ESP	Dani Fernández (at Zamora until 30 June 2027)
—	FW	SEN	Papa Dame Ba (at UD Logroñés until 30 June 2027)

== Club officials ==
=== Current technical staff ===
Position	Staff
Head coach	(Spain) Quique Álvarez
Assistant coach	(Spain) Óscar Álvarez
Fitness coach	(Spain) Jordi Balcells
Goalkeeping coach	(Spain) Juan Carlos Balaguer
Video analyst	(Spain) Jordi Melero
Physiotheraphist	(Spain) Dani Garcia Carvajal
Club doctor	(Spain) Gabriel Lupón Escobar

Last updated: 5 July 2026
Source: Girona FC (in English)

=== Board of directors ===
Office	Name
President	(Spain) Delfí Geli
President board of director	(Spain) Pere Guardiola
Board members	(Bolivia) Marcelo Claure
Board members	(Venezuela) Ricardo Sosa
Board members	(Spain) Roger Solé
Board members	(England) Simon Cliff
Board members	(England) John MacBeath
Board members	(Germany) Ingo Bank
Secretary of the board	(Spain) Ricard Capdevila
CEO	(Spain) Ignacio Mas-Bagà
Sporting director	(Spain) Quique Cárcel
Technical secretary	(Spain) Iván Hammouch
Scouting	(Spain) Juan Carlos Moreno
Performance	(Spain) Totó
Football operations	(Spain) Helena San José
Academy	(Spain) Siscu Sànchez
Sporting director Girona B	(Spain) Albert Síria
Sporting director academy	(Spain) Albert Puig
Women's football team	(Spain) Joan Carles Sánchez
Academy residence	(Spain) Gerard Herrera
Finance, HR and IT	(Spain) Albert Sebastià
Operations	(Spain) Carolina Pujol
Communication and CSR	(Spain) David Torras
Infrastructures	(Spain) Alfonso Ferrer
Commercial and marketing	(Spain) Aran Ferri
Strategy & new business	(Spain) Albert Bagó
Legal and compliance	(Spain) Ricard Capdevila

Last updated: 5 April 2026
Source: Girona FC (in English)

== Coaches ==
- (Spain) Francisco Bru (1937–39)
- (Hungary) Károly Plattkó (1948–49)
- (Spain) Hilario (1949–50)
- (Spain) Domènec Balmanya (1952)
- (Spain) Emilio Aldecoa (1955–57), (1959–60)
- (Uruguay) Dagoberto Moll (1965–66)
- (Spain) Emilio Aldecoa (1967–68)
- (Spain) Vicenç Sasot (1972–74)
- (Spain) Emilio Aldecoa (1974–76)
- (Spain) Lluís Coll (1976)
- (Spain) Vicenç Sasot (1979–80)
- (Spain) Pepe Pinto (1980–81), (1981–82)
- (Spain) Luis Costa (1981–82)
- (Spain) Emilio Aldecoa (1982)
- (Spain) Antonio Lagunas (1987)
- (Spain) Alfonso Muñoz Jaso (1987–88), (1993–95)
- (Spain) José Manuel (1988)
- (Spain) Paco Bonachera (1993)
- (Spain) Pere Gratacós (1997–99)
- (Spain) Narcís Julià (2003)
- (Spain) Agustín Abadía (2003–04)
- (Spain) Josep María Nogués (2005)
- (Spain) Joan Carrillo (2006–07)
- (Spain) Ricardo Rodríguez (2007)
- (Spain) Raül Agné (2007–09)
- (Spain) Javi Salamero (2009)
- (Spain) Miquel Olmo (2009)
- (Spain) Cristóbal Parralo (2009)
- (Spain) Narcís Julià (2009–10)
- (Spain) Raül Agné (2010–12)
- (Spain) Josu Uribe (2012)
- (Spain) Javi Salamero (2012)
- (Spain) Rubi (2012–13)
- (Spain) Ricardo Rodríguez (2013)
- (Spain) Javi López (2013–14)
- (Spain) Pablo Machín (2014–18)
- (Spain) Eusebio Sacristán (2018–19)
- (Spain) Juan Carlos Unzué (2019)
- (Spain) José Luis Martí (2019–20)
- (Spain) Francisco (2020–21)
- (Spain) Míchel (2021–2026)
- (Spain) Quique Álvarez (2026–)

== Honours ==
Source: Història del Girona FC

=== Domestic ===
- **Segunda División B**
  - Winners (1): 2007–08
- **Tercera División**
  - Winners (5): 1933–34, 1947–48, 1954–55, 1988–89, 2005–06

=== Regional titles ===
- **Supercopa de Catalunya**
  - Winners (1): 2019
- **Copa Catalunya**
  - Winners (1): 2025

== Player records ==
=== Most appearances ===
Competitive, professional matches only. Up to date as of 24 August 2024

Rank	Player	Years	League	Cup	Europe	Other	Total
1	(Uruguay) **Cristhian Stuani**	2017–present	228	11	0	10	247
2	(Spain) **Juanpe**	2016–present	224	10	0	12	246
3	(Spain) Borja García	2015–2020; 2021–2024	215	9	0	9	233
4	(Spain) Álex Granell	2014–2020	214	8	0	10	232
5	(Spain) Migue	2007–2014	224	7	0	0	231
6	(Spain) Pere Pons	2013–2019	198	7	0	6	211
7	(Spain) Aday Benítez	2014–2021	185	5	0	9	199
8	(Spain) Jonás Ramalho	2013–2021	168	20	0	3	191
9	(Spain) José	2005–2013	167	4	0	4	175
10	(Spain) Jandro	2010–2015	165	7	0	3	175

=== Top goalscorers ===
Competitive, professional matches only. Up to date as of 24 August 2024

Rank	Player	Years	League	Cup	Europe	Matches	Total
1	(Uruguay) **Cristhian Stuani**	2017–present	120	6	0	247	129
2	(Spain) **Portu**	2016–2019; 2023–present	35	2	0	152	37
3	(Spain) Jandro	2010–2015	36	1	0	175	37
4	(Spain) Felipe Sanchón	2005–2006; 2009; 2012–2017	35	1	0	153	36
5	(Spain) Fran Sandaza	2014–2015; 2016–2018	25	0	0	73	25
6	(Ukraine) Artem Dovbyk	2023–2024	24	0	0	39	24
7	(Paraguay) Javier Acuña	2011–2013	21	0	0	57	21
8	(Spain) Jaime Mata	2014–2016	21	0	0	82	21
9	(Spain) Borja García	2015–2020; 2021–2024	21	0	0	233	21
10	(Spain) Roberto Peragón	2009–2011	20	0	0	76	20

== See also ==
- CF Peralada-Girona B
- Girona FC B
- CF Riudellots
