= Raül Agné =

Spanish footballer and manager

Personal information
- Full name: Raül Agné Montull
- Date of birth: 24 May 1970 (age 56)
- Place of birth: Mequinenza, Spain
- Height: 1.84 m (6 ft 1/2 in)
- Position: Centre-back

Youth career
- Mequinenza
- Zaragoza

Senior career*
Years	Team	Apps	(Gls)
1987–1988	Mequinenza	31	(2)
1990–1992	Zaragoza B	43	(0)
1992–1993	Casetas	26	(3)
1993–1995	Girona	46	(0)
1995–1998	Figueres	72	(2)
1998–2000	Binéfar	59	(0)
2000–2002	Palamós		
2002–2003	Girona		
Total		277+	(7+)

Managerial career
- 2004–2006: Peralada
- 2006–2007: Palamós
- 2007–2009: Girona
- 2009–2010: Recreativo
- 2010–2012: Girona
- 2012–2014: Cádiz
- 2015: Tenerife
- 2016–2017: Zaragoza
- 2017–2018: Nei Mongol Zhongyou
- 2019–2020: Córdoba
- 2021–2023: Gimnàstic
- * Club domestic league appearances and goals

Raül Agné Montull (born 24 May 1970) is a Spanish former footballer who played as a central defender. He worked as a manager after retiring, being of charge of Segunda División clubs Girona (two spells), Recreativo, Tenerife and Zaragoza.

== Playing career ==
Born in Mequinenza, Province of Zaragoza, Aragon, Agné never competed in higher than Segunda División B during his 14-year senior career. He represented Mequinenza CD, Deportivo Aragón, UD Casetas, Girona FC (two stints), UE Figueres, CD Binéfar, Palamós CF, retiring in 2004 at the age of 34.

Agné shared teams with his twin brother Vidal whilst with Binéfar, and also acted as manager to the youth sides.

== Coaching career ==
Agné began his coaching career at CF Peralada one year after retiring, missing out on promotion from Tercera División in his first season. In 2006, he was appointed at former club Palamós, leaving the following year.

In June 2007, Agné signed with Girona. He led the team to Segunda División promotion in the play-offs, but was dismissed on 18 May 2009 due to poor results.

Agné moved to Recreativo de Huelva on 1 December 2009, resigning on 14 June of the following year due to "personal reasons". He returned to Girona the following summer, taking them to a comfortable mid-table finish in the second division in his debut campaign and subsequently renewing for two years; he was relieved of his duties, however, on 15 January 2012.

On 10 December 2012, Agné joined Cádiz CF as the club neared the relegation zone in the third tier. He was sacked on 18 March 2014, with the side still in that league.

Agné was named CD Tenerife manager on 3 February 2015, taking over from Álvaro Cervera at the second division club. On 3 November, after 31 competitive games – one in the Copa del Rey – he was dismissed.

After nearly one year of inactivity, Agné replaced the fired Luis Milla at the helm of Real Zaragoza. On 19 March 2017, he too was sacked.

Agné moved abroad for the first time in December 2017, when he took the job at Nei Mongol Zhongyou F.C. of China League One. He and compatriot assistant Arnau Sala left the following August, with the team second-bottom.

In October 2019, Agné replaced Enrique Martín at the helm of third-tier Córdoba CF for the rest of the season with the option of a second. He lasted only until 10 March, when he himself was replaced by Juan Sabas.

On 28 May 2021, Agné was named manager of Gimnàstic de Tarragona of the newly formed Primera División RFEF. They missed out on promotion in the last round of the 2022 play-offs, and he was dismissed on 15 January 2023 as they were placed 12th.

Agné returned to Figueres in February 2024, being named director of football and methodology as the club was now in the regional championships.

== Personal life ==
Whilst at the service of Girona, Agné walked out of a press conference in February 2011 following an away game against SD Huesca after not being allowed to express himself in Catalan. This sparked a wave of solidarity on the internet, and Catalan essayist Quim Monzó wrote an opinion piece on the subject for La Vanguardia under the title "! تحيا كاتالونيا حرة" (Arabic translation of the independentist slogan Visca Catalunya Lliure! – Long Live Free Catalonia!).

== Managerial statistics ==
As of 14 January 2023

Managerial record by team and tenure
Team	Nat	From	To	Record								Ref
Team	Nat	From	To	G	W	D	L	GF	GA	GD	Win %	Ref
Peralada	(Spain)	1 July 2004	30 June 2006	76	33	20	23	111	101	+10	43.42	
Palamós	(Spain)	1 July 2006	28 June 2007	38	13	12	13	41	41	+0	34.21	
Girona	(Spain)	28 June 2007	18 May 2009	81	32	29	20	102	75	+27	39.51	
Recreativo	(Spain)	1 December 2009	14 June 2010	30	9	14	7	30	32	−2	30.00	
Girona	(Spain)	21 July 2010	15 January 2012	64	18	20	26	82	96	−14	28.13	
Cádiz	(Spain)	10 December 2012	18 March 2014	52	24	11	17	77	48	+29	46.15	
Tenerife	(Spain)	3 February 2015	3 November 2015	31	7	13	11	36	41	−5	22.58	
Zaragoza	(Spain)	25 October 2016	19 March 2017	19	6	4	9	23	26	−3	31.58	
Nei Mongol Zhongyou	(China)	21 December 2017	9 August 2018	18	4	1	13	19	37	−18	22.22	
Córdoba	(Spain)	23 October 2019	10 March 2020	20	9	5	6	23	19	+4	45.00	
Gimnàstic	(Spain)	28 May 2021	15 January 2023	63	26	19	18	67	60	+7	41.27	
Total				492	181	148	163	611	576	+35	36.79	—
