= Arnau Sala =

Spanish footballer and manager

Personal information
- Full name: Arnau Sala Descals
- Date of birth: 20 November 1971 (age 54)
- Place of birth: Sant Fruitós de Bages, Spain
- Height: 1.78 m (5 ft 10 in)
- Position: Defender

Team information
- Current team: Girona (assistant)

Youth career
- Manresa

Senior career*
Years	Team	Apps	(Gls)
1989–1993	Manresa	84	(12)
1993	Zaragoza B	16	(1)
1993–1994	Manlleu	34	(2)
1994–1999	Figueres	143	(13)
1999–2001	Córdoba	46	(4)
2001–2002	Figueres	26	(0)
2002–2004	Girona	33	(3)
2004–2006	Peralada		
Total		382	(35)

Managerial career
- 2007–2009: Girona (assistant)
- 2009–2010: Recreativo Huelva (assistant)
- 2010–2013: Figueres
- 2013: Girona B
- 2013–2014: Olot
- 2015–2017: Peralada
- 2017–2018: IM Zhongyou (assistant)
- 2019–: Girona (assistant)
- * Club domestic league appearances and goals

Arnau Sala Descals (born 20 November 1971) is a Spanish retired footballer who played as a defender, and a manager. He is currently the assistant manager of Girona FC.

== Club career ==
Born in Sant Fruitós de Bages, Barcelona, Catalonia, Sala made his senior debuts with CE Manresa in Tercera División. After appearing with Real Zaragoza B and AEC Manlleu in Segunda División B, he joined UE Figueres in the same level in the 1994 summer.

In June 1999 Sala joined Segunda División's Córdoba CF. He played his first match as a professional on 28 August, aged 28, starting in a 0–1 away loss against Recreativo de Huelva.

Sala scored his first professional goal on 2 October, netting his side's first of a 2–1 home win against CA Osasuna. After appearing in 36 matches and scoring four goals during his first campaign, he was sparingly used in his second, and subsequently returned to Figueres in the 2001 summer.

In 2002 Sala joined Girona FC, achieving promotion from the fourth level at first attempt. He retired in 2006, aged 35, with CF Peralada in the same division.

== Manager career ==
On 3 June 2010, after being Raül Agné's assistant at Girona and Recreativo de Huelva, Sala was appointed Figueres manager. He achieved two consecutive promotions with the club, taking them back to the fourth level in the 2012–13 season.

In February 2013 Sala announced he would leave Figueres at the end of the season, and was appointed at the helm of Girona FC B on 4 July. On 29 December he was appointed UE Olot manager, replacing fired Edu Vílchez.

On 10 May 2014, after narrowly avoiding relegation, Sala renewed with Olot. He was dismissed that November, with the team again in the drop zone.

Sala returned to Peralada as manager in 2015, and in his second season won promotion from the fourth tier with a playoff victory over Club Rápido de Bouzas. In December 2017, he left to be Agné's assistant again, this time with Nei Mongol Zhongyou F.C. in China League One. The pair were dismissed the following August, with the team second from bottom.

On 23 October 2019, Sala and Raül Agné returned to Girona FC.

== Managerial statistics ==
As of 17 December 2017

Managerial record by team and tenure
Team	Nat	From	To	Record								Ref
Team	Nat	From	To	G	W	D	L	GF	GA	GD	Win %	Ref
Figueres	(Spain)	3 June 2010	4 July 2013	106	62	22	22	196	102	+94	58.49	
Girona B	(Spain)	4 July 2013	29 December 2013	15	9	5	1	34	17	+17	60.00	
Olot	(Spain)	29 December 2013	24 November 2014	33	10	10	13	37	45	−8	30.30	
Peralada	(Spain)	27 May 2015	21 December 2017	101	42	26	33	144	111	+33	41.58	
Total				255	123	63	69	411	275	+136	48.24	—
