= Javi Salamero =

Spanish footballer and manager

Personal information
- Full name: Javier Salamero Marco
- Date of birth: 26 June 1971 (age 55)
- Place of birth: Zaragoza, Spain
- Position: Defender

Team information
- Current team: Figueres (team manager)

Youth career
- Zaragoza
- Stadium Casablanca

Senior career*
Years	Team	Apps	(Gls)
1989–1993	Lloret		
1993	Calella		
1994	Blanes	16	(2)
1994–1995	Lloret	?	(18)
1995–1996	Premià	37	(11)
1996–1998	Vilobí	44	(9)
1998	Lloret	16	(8)
1998–1999	Vilassar Mar	34	(11)

Managerial career
- 2001–2002: Vilobí (youth)
- 2003–2004: Cassà
- 2004–2005: FE Figueres
- 2007: Girona
- 2009: Girona
- 2011–2012: Farners
- 2012: Girona
- 2012–2013: Gimnàstic
- 2013: Sabadell
- 2017–2018: Llagostera B
- 2018–2019: Palamós
- * Club domestic league appearances and goals

Javier Salamero Marco (born 26 June 1971) is a Spanish retired footballer who played as a defender, and is currently working as a team manager for UE Figueres.

== Managerial career ==
Salamero was a director of football in Girona FC, arriving in 2005, when the Catalans were in the fourth division, and helping the club to achieve two successive promotions. In May 2009, he was appointed the club's new manager, replacing Raül Agné. With only two matches in charge, Salamero saved the club from relegation.

In September 2010, Salamero decided to leave Girona. In summer 2011, he was appointed the new manager of CE Farners, in the fifth division. On 25 March 2012, he was called back to Girona, replacing Josu Uribe. Salamero saved the club again, but rescinded with the club after the end of the season.

On 14 October, Salamero was appointed the Gimnàstic de Tarragona's new manager, replacing fired Kiko Ramírez. Despite leading the club to an impressive improval of form, Salamero's contract was not renewed and he was released at the end of the season.

On 3 July 2013, Salamero was appointed CE Sabadell FC manager. He was relieved from his duties on 28 November, with the club in the relegation places.

At the end of May 2019 it was announced, that UE Figueres had hired Salamero from the upcoming season, as a team manager where he would be the link between the board and the different plots.
