= Alberto Quintana =

Alberto Quintana may refer to:

- Alberto Quintana (footballer, born 1996), Spanish football midfielder
- Alberto Quintana (footballer, born 2001), Spanish football defender

== See also ==
- Albert de Quintana
