= Piti Belmonte =

Spanish footballer and coach

Personal information
- Full name: Pedro Belmonte Rincón
- Date of birth: 13 September 1973 (age 53)
- Place of birth: Barcelona, Spain
- Height: 1.80 m (5 ft 11 in)
- Position: Midfielder

Youth career
- Sabadell

Senior career*
Years	Team	Apps	(Gls)
1991–1993	Sabadell B		
1992–1994	Sabadell		
1994–1995	Valencia B		
1995–1996	Almería		
1996–1998	Sabadell		
1998–2002	Figueres	132	(16)
2002–2003	Hércules	33	(2)
2003–2004	Lleida	34	(2)
2004–2005	Algeciras	17	(2)
2005–2006	Terrassa	32	(4)
2006–2007	Jaén	8	(0)
2007	Badalona	18	(3)
2007–2009	Gavà	61	(4)
2009–2010	Gramenet	13	(1)

Managerial career
- 2010: Gramenet
- 2010–2011: San Cristóbal
- 2011–2013: Sant Andreu
- 2013–2014: Badalona
- 2014–2015: Sant Andreu
- * Club domestic league appearances and goals

Pedro "Piti" Belmonte Rincón (born 13 September 1973) is a Spanish retired professional footballer who played as a midfielder, and a current coach.

== Playing career ==
Born in Barcelona, Catalonia, Piti finished his graduation with CE Sabadell FC, making his professional debut on 6 September 1992, playing the last three minutes of a 0–3 away loss against UE Figueres in the Segunda División. His first goal came on 13 June of the following year, but in a 3–4 home loss against Racing de Santander. However, the Arquelinats dropped two divisions, due to financial problems.

In 1994 Piti joined Valencia CF Mestalla, and a season later he signed with CP Almería. He returned to Sabadell in 1996, and two seasons later joined UE Figueres. He resumed the most of 1his career playing for teams in his native region, and eventually hang up his boots in February 2010, aged 36, with UDA Gramenet.

== Manager career ==
After hanging up his boots Villa was a manager of UDA Gramenet, and had to deal with the club's financial problems during the 2009–10 season. In November 2010, he signed with lowly CP San Cristóbal.

In June 2011, Piti was appointed manager of UE Sant Andreu. He finished his both seasons with two mid-table finishes (10th and 7th, respectively), and was relieved from his duties in May 2013.

On 10 June 2013, Piti was appointed CF Badalona's manager.
