= Albert de Quintana i Combis =

Spanish politician and poet (1834–1907)

Albert de Quintana y Combis
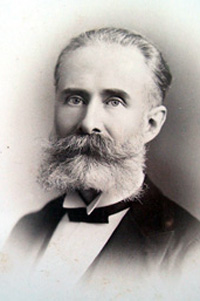
- Albert de Quintana y Combis
- Born: 28 November 1834; Torroella de Montgrí, Catalonia, Spain
- Died: 17 March 1907 (aged 72); Girona, Spain
- Citizenship: Spanish
- Occupations: Landowner; Politician; Poet
- Known for: A deputy for the province of Girona
- Political party: Liberal Party

Albert de Quintana i Combis (11 November 1834 – 17 March 1907) was a Spanish landowner, politician, and poet. Politically, he was the provincial deputy for Girona several times during the 1870s and 1880s.

== Early life and education ==
Albert de Quintana y Combis was born in Torroella de Montgrí, Catalonia, on 11 November 1834, as the son of José Combis y Bertrán, a native of Peratallada, and Antonia de Quintana de Pouplana, from a family of landowners based in Montgrí. Due to a fiduciary arrangement, he initially used his mother's surname.

== Writing career ==
From an early age, Quintana developed a passion for literature, aligning himself with the liberal movement and the political ideals of the Catalan Renaixença, drawing inspiration from Víctor Balaguer. He focused exclusively on poetry, always writing in Catalan, and often about patriotic themes from medieval Catalan history. It was under the pseudonym Lo cantor del Ter ("The singer of Ter") that he began publishing his first works in the 1850s, doing so in the local newspaper El Conceller, and his talent earned him recognition in several literary competitions; for instance, in 1858, the 24-year-old Quintana won a prize in a competition held by the Academy of Good Letters of Barcelona for his epic poem La conquista de Mallorca per don Jaume el Conquistador ("The conquest of Mallorca by Don Jaume the Conqueror"), written in royal octaves.

In the following year, Quintana participated and won a prize in the inaugural edition of the Floral Games of Barcelona, thus becoming a regular participant throughout the years, winning awards in 1860, 1869, and 1870, winning a "golden englantina" in the latter with the work Cansó del compte d'Urgell en Jaume, which was published in La Bisbal by the printing house of J. Gener. His contribution to the Floral Games did not stop at being a contestant, as he later served as a Consistory member in 1873 and even as president in 1874. His not very extensive poetic work, characterized by historicist romanticism, was partially compiled in Lectura Popular; however, some pieces, such as La batalla de Muret (1868), were never published.

Quintana also participated in the works Chanson catalane and Toi!, both written by Manuel Giró in 1878.

== Landowning career ==
Like many of his ancestors, Quintana managed extensive agricultural estates in Torroella de Montgrí and other parts of Empordà, focusing on cork production alongside other crops. He experimented with innovative farming techniques and advocated for developing a domestic cork stopper industry to support the local economy. As a parliamentarian and director of the board for the Defense of the Production and Cork Industries of Catalonia, he championed the introduction of export tariffs. Additionally, he co-owned a farm in Puerto Rico with other business partners.

== Political career ==
Politically, Quintana was part of the Progressive Party's most Catalanist faction, which supported administrative decentralization. At some point in the mid-1860s, he became a provincial deputy for La Bisbal, and thus, in 1868, he participated in festivities held there in honor of Frédéric Mistral. His position at La Bisbal allowed him to participate in the revolutionary movement that culminated in the Glorious Revolution. Its success benefited Quintana, as he then held several political positions in the early 1870s, such as provincial deputy for Girona (1869–1871), civil governor of Huesca (1872), and a member of the Cortes representing Santa Coloma de Farners (1872). After the liberal coalition split, he aligned himself with Práxedes Mateo Sagasta's constitutionalist faction.

Throughout his career, Quintana attended several World's fairs as a delegate, representing Girona at the Exposition Universelle of 1867, and then the Spanish Government at both the 1873 Vienna World's Fair and the Paris Exhibition of 1878, the latter as part of the Royal Commission. He also played a key role in organizing Spain's participation in the Centennial Exposition at Philadelphia in 1876 and also undertook several international missions to promote agricultural and livestock production.

During the early years of the Restoration, Quintana aligned himself with the parliamentary center and renewed his loyalty to Sagasta after the Liberal Fusion of 1880. He was the provincial deputy for Girona on four separate occasions (1876–79, 1881–84, 1884–86, and 1886–88), the last of which ended following his resignation from his parliamentary seat to travel to Cuba, where he held several positions in the Spanish colonial administration, such as Secretary of the General Government of Cuba, and later the island's General Superintendent of Finances, a position that he held in 1888–89. Although elected senator for Girona in 1894, he never formally took office.

== Personal life ==
Quintana was married twice, first to Pompeya Serra y Padrosa, a native of Mataró, where the family lived for a few years, and the couple had four children: Pompeyo, María, Eugenia, and José. Following his wife's premature death, he married her sister Oriola, with whom he had three more children: Carolina, Antonia, and Albert; several of them held political office. During his stint in Cuba, his eldest son, Pompeyo de Quintana y Serra (1858–1939), met his future wife Flora de León y Dorticós, niece of the island's captain-general.

== Death ==
Quintana died in Girona on 17 March 1907, at the age of 72. His work Les idees lliberals en la política española ("Liberal ideas in Spanish politics") was published posthumously in 1910.

== Bibliography ==
- Elías de Molins, Antonio (2010). Diccionario Biográfico Y Bibliográfico De Escritores Y Artistas Catalanes Del Siglo XIX (1889-1895) [Biographical and Bibliographic Dictionary of Catalan Writers and Artists of the 19th Century (1889-1895)] (in Spanish). Barcelona: Nabu Press. p. 716. ISBN 978-2-296-55969-1.
