= Ela =

Ela or ELA may refer to:

== Companies and organizations ==
- Basque Workers' Solidarity (Basque: Euskal Langileen Alkartasuna), a trade union
- Revolutionary People's Struggle (Greek: Επαναστατικός Λαϊκός Αγώνας, ΕΛΑ), a Greek left-wing terrorist organization.
- Earth Liberation Army
- ELA Aviación, a Spanish aircraft manufacturer
- English Lacrosse Association
- Equatorial Launch Australia, owner-operator of Arnhem Space Centre in northern Australia
- European Left Alliance for the People and the Planet, a European political party
- European Lift Association, a trade association
- European Laser Association, see Lasers in Medical Science
- European Labour Authority

== Music ==
- E.L.A. (album), by Elastinen
- "Ela" (Barrice song)
- Ela (Peggy Zina album)
- "Ela" (Andromache song)

== People ==
- Ela (name), given name
- Ela (surname)
- Eḷa, or Elu, ancestor to the Sinhalese and Dhivehi languages

== Places ==
- East Los Angeles, California, United States
- Eastside Los Angeles, United States
- Ela (woreda), now Konta, Ethiopia
- Ela, North Carolina, United States
- Ela Beach, in Port Moresby, Papua New Guinea
- Ela River, in New Hampshire, United States
- Ela Township, Lake County, Illinois, United States
- Parc Ela, a Swiss nature park
  - Piz Ela, a mountain therein
- ELA-1 (Ensemble de Lancement Ariane), a rocket launch pad in French Guiana
- Experimental Lakes Area, in northwestern Ontario, Canada
- Nay Pyi Taw International Airport, formerly Ela Airport, in Myanmar

== Other uses ==
- Elative case, in grammar
- Electronic Journal of Linear Algebra
- Emergency Liquidity Assistance
- English language arts
- Equilibrium line altitude, in an iceberg
- Error level analysis, the analysis of compression artifacts in digital data
- Experimental Lakes Area, in northwestern Ontario, Canada
- Ela (moth), a synonym of the moth genus Euproctis
- Ela, note name, see Guidonian hand
- Ela, the feminine third-person personal pronoun in Portuguese

== See also ==
- Elah (disambiguation)
- Elá (disambiguation)
