= EFLA =

EFLA can mean:

- European Foundation for Landscape Architecture
- Vesivehmaa Airport (IATA code: EFLA), Lahti, Finland
- European Forum of the National Lift Associations, predecessor of the trade association European Lift Association
