= Ela (surname) =

Ela is a surname. Notable people with the surname include:

- Acacio Mañé Ela (c. 1904–1959), Equatoguinean nationalist and politician
- Florencio Mayé Elá (born 1944), Equatoguinean politician
- George Ela (1868–1957), American politician
- Jacob Hart Ela (1820–1884), American politician
- Jacinto Elá (born 1982), Equatoguinean footballer
- Jean-Marc Ela (1936–2008), Cameroonian priest
- Mohamed Aboul Ela (born 1980), Egyptian footballer
- Regina Mañe Ela (1954–2015), Equatoguinean politician
- Ruslan Elá (born 1983), Equatoquinean footballer

== See also ==
- Ela (name)
