= Elá =

Elá may refer to:

- Jacinto Elá (born 1982), Equatoguinean retired professional footballer
- Ruslan Elá (born 1983), Equatoguinean retired footballer
- CD Elá Nguema, Equatoguinean football club based in Malabo
