= Portuguese conjugation =

Grammatical forms of verbs in the Portuguese language

Portuguese verbs display a high degree of inflection. A typical regular verb has over fifty different forms, expressing up to six different grammatical tenses and three moods. Two forms are peculiar to Portuguese within the Romance languages, shared with Galician:

- The personal infinitive, a non-finite form which does not show tense, but is inflected for person and number.
- The future subjunctive, is sometimes archaic in some dialects (including peninsular) of related languages such as Spanish, but still active in Portuguese.

It has also several verbal periphrases.

== Overview ==
Portuguese verbs have the following properties.

1. Two numbers—singular, plural
2. Three persons—first, second, third
3. Three aspects—perfective, imperfective, progressive*
4. Two voices—active, passive*
5. Six morphological forms for tenses, aspects, and/or moods—present, preterite, imperfect, pluperfect, future, and conditional.
6. Three (or four) moods—indicative, subjunctive, imperative (and conditional, according to some authors)

Classes with an asterisk are entirely periphrastic. The passive voice can be constructed in two different ways. The pluperfect and the future of the indicative mood, as well as the conditional form, are often replaced with other verbal constructions or verbal periphrases in the spoken language.

== Basic tenses and moods ==
Conjugation is demonstrated here with the irregular verb fazer, "to do":

number	person	Indicative mood					Conditional (Note: The Portuguese conditional is sometimes replaced with a periphrasis or with the imperfect indicative in the spoken language. Some authors regard it as a mood of its own, others treat it as a tense of the indicative mood.)
number	person	Present	Preterite	Imperfect	Pluperfect (Note: The pluperfect indicative can also be expressed with an equivalent periphrasis.)	Future (Note: The future indicative is usually replaced with a periphrasis or the present indicative in the spoken language.)	Conditional
singular	1st	faço	fiz	fazia	fizera	farei	faria
singular	2nd	fazes	fizeste	fazias	fizeras	farás	farias
singular	3rd	faz	fez	fazia	fizera	fará	faria
plural	1st	fazemos	fizemos	fazíamos	fizéramos	faremos	faríamos
plural	2nd	fazeis	fizestes	fazíeis	fizéreis	fareis	faríeis
plural	3rd	fazem	fizeram	faziam	fizeram	farão	fariam
number	person	Subjunctive mood					Personal infinitive (Note: In regular verbs, the future subjunctive and the personal infinitive are identical.)
number	person	Present	Preterite	Imperfect	Pluperfect	Future	Personal infinitive
singular	1st	faça	tenha feito	fizesse	tivesse feito	fizer	fazer
singular	2nd	faças	tenhas feito	fizesses	tivesses feito	fizeres	fazeres
singular	3rd	faça	tenha feito	fizesse	tivesse feito	fizer	fazer
plural	1st	façamos	tenhamos feito	fizéssemos	tivéssemos feito	fizermos	fazermos
plural	2nd	façais	tenhais feito	fizésseis	tivésseis feito	fizerdes	fazerdes
plural	3rd	façam	tenham feito	fizessem	tivessem feito	fizerem	fazerem
number	person	Imperative mood (Note: See the section on the imperative, below.)		Infinitive		fazer	
number	person	Affirmative imperative	Negative imperative	Infinitive		fazer	
singular	1st	—	—	Past participle		feito	
singular	2nd	faz/faze	faças	Past participle		feito	
singular	3rd	faça	faça	Present participle (Note: Not in common use today except for some adjectives or nouns that are typically replaced by the corresponding agent nouns ("-dor(a)", "-ista", etc.) or the standard gerund. See below.)		faciente	
plural	1st	façamos	façamos	Present participle		faciente	
plural	2nd	fazei	façais	Gerund		fazendo	
plural	3rd	façam	façam	Gerund		fazendo	

Periphrastic forms are as follows:

Tense	Basic	Progressive		Perfect	Perfect progressive	
Tense	Basic	Infinitive	Gerund	Perfect	Infinitive	Gerund
Present	faço	estou a fazer	estou fazendo	tenho feito	tenho estado a fazer	tenho estado fazendo
Past	fiz	estava a fazer	estava fazendo	tinha feito	tinha estado a fazer	tinha estado fazendo
Future	farei	estarei a fazer	estarei fazendo	terei feito	terei estado a fazer	terei estado fazendo

=== Description ===
The tenses correspond to:

- Present (presente): "I do" or "I am doing".
- Preterite (pretérito, or pretérito perfeito): "I did" or "I have done"; referring to past actions, typically but not always completed ones.
- Imperfect (imperfeito, or pretérito imperfeito): "I did", "I used to do", "I was doing"; referring to incomplete actions in the past tense.
- Pluperfect (mais-que-perfeito, or pretérito mais-que-perfeito): "I had done"; referring to a completed actions in the past tense.
- Future (futuro, or futuro do presente in Brazilian Portuguese): "I will do"/ "I am going to do"; used for future actions, but also the immediate future tense.
- Conditional (condicional, or futuro do pretérito in Brazilian Portuguese): "I would do". Used in some types of conditional sentences, as a form of courtesy, or as a future-in-the-past.

The five non-finite forms generally correspond to:

- (Impersonal) infinitive (infinitivo, or infinitivo impessoal): equivalent to English "to do".
- Past participle (particípio, or particípio passado): equivalent to English "done".
- Present participle (particípio presente): Uncommon in modern speech. Somewhat equivalent to English "doer", or used as an adjective relating to an ongoing action, or that action in general. For example, "falante" can mean "talking (+ noun)", "talkative" or "speaker". See notes above.
- Gerund (gerúndio): equivalent to English "(is) doing". Used to actually show/describe ongoing action.
- Personal infinitive (infinitivo pessoal): "(for me) to do", an infinitive which inflects according to its subject; a rare feature that Portuguese shares with Galician.

The moods are used roughly as follows:

- Indicative (indicativo): for factual statements or positive beliefs. Example of an English equivalent: "I have done".
- Subjunctive (subjuntivo, or conjuntivo): mostly used when speaking of unreal, uncertain, or unassumed conditions: "Were I to do".
- Imperative (imperativo): for direct commands or requests; equivalent to the English "Do!"

For the Portuguese personal pronouns (which are omitted whenever they can be inferred from the ending of the conjugated verb or the context), see Portuguese personal pronouns and possessives.

== Conjugations ==
Regular verbs belong to one of three conjugation classes, distinguished by the ending of their infinitive forms (which is also their citation form):

- Those whose infinitive ends in -ar belong to the first conjugation (e.g. lavar, matar, ladrar);
- Those whose infinitive ends in -er belong to the second conjugation (e.g. correr, comer, colher);
- Those whose infinitive ends in -ir belong to the third conjugation (e.g. partir, destruir, urdir);

The verb pôr is conventionally placed in the second conjugation by many authors, since it is derived from Old Portuguese poer (Latin ponere). In any event, this is an irregular verb whose conjugation must be learned on its own. Other verbs with infinitives ending in -or, such as depor, compor, and propor are derivatives of pôr, and are conjugated in the same way.

=== First conjugation (cantar) ===
number	person	Indicative mood					Conditional
number	person	Present	Preterite	Imperfect	Pluperfect	Future	Conditional
singular	1st	canto	cantei	cantava	cantara	cantarei	cantaria
singular	2nd	cantas	cantaste	cantavas	cantaras	cantarás	cantarias
singular	3rd	canta	cantou	cantava	cantara	cantará	cantaria
plural	1st	cantamos	cantámos^{EP} cantamos^{BP}	cantávamos	cantáramos	cantaremos	cantaríamos
plural	2nd	cantais	cantastes	cantáveis	cantáreis	cantareis	cantaríeis
plural	3rd	cantam	cantaram	cantavam	cantaram	cantarão	cantariam
number	person	Subjunctive mood					Personal infinitive
number	person	Present	Preterite	Imperfect	Pluperfect	Future	Personal infinitive
singular	1st	cante	tenha cantado	cantasse	tivesse cantado	cantar	cantar
singular	2nd	cantes	tenhas cantado	cantasses	tivesses cantado	cantares	cantares
singular	3rd	cante	tenha cantado	cantasse	tivesse cantado	cantar	cantar
plural	1st	cantemos	tenhamos cantado	cantássemos	tivéssemos cantado	cantarmos	cantarmos
plural	2nd	canteis	tenhais cantado	cantásseis	tivésseis cantado	cantardes	cantardes
plural	3rd	cantem	tenham cantado	cantassem	tivessem cantado	cantarem	cantarem
number	person	Imperative mood		Infinitive		cantar	
number	person	Affirmative imperative	Negative imperative	Infinitive		cantar	
singular	1st	—	—	Past participle		cantado	
singular	2nd	canta	cantes	Past participle		cantado	
singular	3rd	cante	cante	Present participle		cantante	
plural	1st	cantemos	cantemos	Present participle		cantante	
plural	2nd	cantai	canteis	Gerund		cantando	
plural	3rd	cantem	cantem	Gerund		cantando	

=== Second conjugation (comer) ===
number	person	Indicative mood					Conditional
number	person	Present	Preterite	Imperfect	Pluperfect	Future	Conditional
singular	1st	como	comi	comia	comera	comerei	comeria
singular	2nd	comes	comeste	comias	comeras	comerás	comerias
singular	3rd	come	comeu	comia	comera	comerá	comeria
plural	1st	comemos	comemos	comíamos	comêramos	comeremos	comeríamos
plural	2nd	comeis	comestes	comíeis	comêreis	comereis	comeríeis
plural	3rd	comem	comeram	comiam	comeram	comerão	comeriam
number	person	Subjunctive mood					Personal infinitive
number	person	Present	Preterite	Imperfect	Pluperfect	Future	Personal infinitive
singular	1st	coma	tenha comido	comesse	tivesse comido	comer	comer
singular	2nd	comas	tenhas comido	comesses	tivesses comido	comeres	comeres
singular	3rd	coma	tenha comido	comesse	tivesse comido	comer	comer
plural	1st	comamos	tenhamos comido	comêssemos	tivéssemos comido	comermos	comermos
plural	2nd	comais	tenhais comido	comêsseis	tivésseis comido	comerdes	comerdes
plural	3rd	comam	tenham comido	comessem	tivessem comido	comerem	comerem
number	person	Imperative mood		Infinitive		comer	
number	person	Affirmative imperative	Negative imperative	Infinitive		comer	
singular	1st	—	—	Past participle		comido	
singular	2nd	come	comas	Past participle		comido	
singular	3rd	coma	coma	Present participle		comente	
plural	1st	comamos	comamos	Present participle		comente	
plural	2nd	comei	comais	Gerund		comendo	
plural	3rd	comam	comam	Gerund		comendo	

=== Third conjugation (partir) ===
number	person	Indicative mood					Conditional
number	person	Present	Preterite	Imperfect	Pluperfect	Future	Conditional
singular	1st	parto	parti	partia	partira	partirei	partiria
singular	2nd	partes	partiste	partias	partiras	partirás	partirias
singular	3rd	parte	partiu	partia	partira	partirá	partiria
plural	1st	partimos	partimos	partíamos	partíramos	partiremos	partiríamos
plural	2nd	partis	partistes	partíeis	partíreis	partireis	partiríeis
plural	3rd	partem	partiram	partiam	partiram	partirão	partiriam
number	person	Subjunctive mood					Personal infinitive
number	person	Present	Preterite	Imperfect	Pluperfect	Future	Personal infinitive
singular	1st	parta	tenha partido	partisse	tivesse partido	partir	partir
singular	2nd	partas	tenhas partido	partisses	tivesses partido	partires	partires
singular	3rd	parta	tenha partido	partisse	tivesse partido	partir	partir
plural	1st	partamos	tenhamos partido	partíssemos	tivéssemos partido	partirmos	partirmos
plural	2nd	partais	tenhais partido	partísseis	tivésseis partido	partirdes	partirdes
plural	3rd	partam	tenham partido	partissem	tivessem partido	partirem	partirem
number	person	Imperative mood		Infinitive		partir	
number	person	Affirmative imperative	Negative imperative	Infinitive		partir	
singular	1st	—	—	Past participle		partido	
singular	2nd	parte	partas	Past participle		partido	
singular	3rd	parta	parta	Present participle		partinte	
plural	1st	partamos	partamos	Present participle		partinte	
plural	2nd	parti	partais	Gerund		partindo	
plural	3rd	partam	partam	Gerund		partindo	

=== Quick reference ===
Non-finite forms				Imperative	
Infinitive	Past participle	Present participle	Gerund	Imperative	
-ar -er -ir	-ado -ido -ido	-ante -ente -inte	-ando -endo -indo	(tu)	-a -e -e
-ar -er -ir	-ado -ido -ido	-ante -ente -inte	-ando -endo -indo	(vós)	-ai -ei -i

Person	Indicative						Subjunctive		Future subj. or personal infin.
Person	Present	Preterite	Imperfect	Pluperfect	Future	Conditional	Present	Imperfect	Future subj. or personal infin.
eu	-o -o -o	-ei -i -i	-ava -ia -ia	-ara -era -ira	-arei -erei -irei	-aria -eria -iria	-e -a -a	-asse -esse -isse	-ar -er -ir
tu	-as -es -es	-aste -este -iste	-avas -ias -ias	-aras -eras -iras	-arás -erás -irás	-arias -erias -irias	-es -as -as	-asses -esses -isses	-ares -eres -ires
ele/ela	-a -e -e	-ou -eu -iu	-ava -ia -ia	-ara -era -ira	-ará -erá -irá	-aria -eria -iria	-e -a -a	-asse -esse -isse	-ar -er -ir
nós	-amos -emos -imos	-ámos^{EP}/-amos^{BP} -emos -imos	-ávamos -íamos -íamos	-áramos -êramos -íramos	-aremos -eremos -iremos	-aríamos -eríamos -iríamos	-emos -amos -amos	-ássemos -êssemos -íssemos	-armos -ermos -irmos
vós	-ais -eis -is	-astes -estes -istes	-áveis -íeis -íeis	-áreis -êreis -íreis	-areis -ereis -ireis	-aríeis -eríeis -iríeis	-eis -ais -ais	-ásseis -êsseis -ísseis	-ardes -erdes -irdes
eles/elas	-am -em -em	-aram -eram -iram	-avam -iam -iam	-aram -eram -iram	-arão -erão -irão	-ariam -eriam -iriam	-em -am -am	-assem -essem -issem	-arem -erem -irem

== Important irregular verbs ==
The following irregular verbs are used as auxiliary verbs in various periphrastic constructions.

=== ter – to have ===
number	person	Indicative mood					Conditional
number	person	Present	Preterite	Imperfect	Pluperfect	Future	Conditional
singular	1st	tenho	tive	tinha	tivera	terei	teria
singular	2nd	tens	tiveste	tinhas	tiveras	terás	terias
singular	3rd	tem	teve	tinha	tivera	terá	teria
plural	1st	temos	tivemos	tínhamos	tivéramos	teremos	teríamos
plural	2nd	tendes	tivestes	tínheis	tivéreis	tereis	teríeis
plural	3rd	têm	tiveram	tinham	tiveram	terão	teriam
number	person	Subjunctive mood					Personal infinitive
number	person	Present	Preterite	Imperfect	Pluperfect	Future	Personal infinitive
singular	1st	tenha	tenha tido	tivesse	tivesse tido	tiver	ter
singular	2nd	tenhas	tenhas tido	tivesses	tivesses tido	tiveres	teres
singular	3rd	tenha	tenha tido	tivesse	tivesse tido	tiver	ter
plural	1st	tenhamos	tenhamos tido	tivéssemos	tivéssemos tido	tivermos	termos
plural	2nd	tenhais	tenhais tido	tivésseis	tivésseis tido	tiverdes	terdes
plural	3rd	tenham	tenham tido	tivessem	tivessem tido	tiverem	terem
Imperative mood				Infinitive		ter	
2nd pers. sing.		tem		Past participle		tido	
2nd pers. plur.		tende		Gerund		tendo	

=== estar – to be ===
number	person	Indicative mood					Conditional
number	person	Present	Preterite	Imperfect	Pluperfect	Future	Conditional
singular	1st	estou	estive	estava	estivera	estarei	estaria
singular	2nd	estás	estiveste	estavas	estiveras	estarás	estarias
singular	3rd	está	esteve	estava	estivera	estará	estaria
plural	1st	estamos	estivemos	estávamos	estivéramos	estaremos	estaríamos
plural	2nd	estais	estivestes	estáveis	estivéreis	estareis	estaríeis
plural	3rd	estão	estiveram	estavam	estiveram	estarão	estariam
number	person	Subjunctive mood					Personal infinitive
number	person	Present	Preterite	Imperfect	Pluperfect	Future	Personal infinitive
singular	1st	esteja	tenha estado	estivesse	tivesse estado	estiver	estar
singular	2nd	estejas	tenhas estado	estivesses	tivesses estado	estiveres	estares
singular	3rd	esteja	tenha estado	estivesse	tivesse estado	estiver	estar
plural	1st	estejamos	tenhamos estado	estivéssemos	tivéssemos estado	estivermos	estarmos
plural	2nd	estejais	tenhais estado	estivésseis	tivésseis estado	estiverdes	estardes
plural	3rd	estejam	tenham estado	estivessem	tivessem estado	estiverem	estarem
Imperative mood				Infinitive		estar	
2nd pers. sing.		está		Past participle		estado	
2nd pers. plur.		estai		Gerund		estando	

=== ser – to be ===
number	person	Indicative mood					Conditional
number	person	Present	Preterite	Imperfect	Pluperfect	Future	Conditional
singular	1st	sou	fui	era	fora	serei	seria
singular	2nd	és	foste	eras	foras	serás	serias
singular	3rd	é	foi	era	fora	será	seria
plural	1st	somos	fomos	éramos	fôramos	seremos	seríamos
plural	2nd	sois	fostes	éreis	fôreis	sereis	seríeis
plural	3rd	são	foram	eram	foram	serão	seriam
number	person	Subjunctive mood					Personal infinitive
number	person	Present	Preterite	Imperfect	Pluperfect	Future	Personal infinitive
singular	1st	seja	tenha sido	fosse	tivesse sido	for	ser
singular	2nd	sejas	tenhas sido	fosses	tivesses sido	fores	seres
singular	3rd	seja	tenha sido	fosse	tivesse sido	for	ser
plural	1st	sejamos	tenhamos sido	fôssemos	tivéssemos sido	formos	sermos
plural	2nd	sejais	tenhais sido	fôsseis	tivésseis sido	fordes	serdes
plural	3rd	sejam	tenham sido	fossem	tivessem sido	forem	serem
Imperative mood				Infinitive		ser	
2nd pers. sing.		sê		Past participle		sido	
3rd pers. sing.		seja		Present participle		ente	
2nd pers. plur.		sede		Gerund		sendo	

=== haver – to have, to happen, there to be ===
number	person	Indicative mood					Conditional
number	person	Present	Preterite	Imperfect	Pluperfect	Future	Conditional
singular	1st	hei	houve	havia	houvera	haverei	haveria
singular	2nd	hás	houveste	havias	houveras	haverás	haverias
singular	3rd	há	houve	havia	houvera	haverá	haveria
plural	1st	havemos hemos (archaic)	houvemos	havíamos	houvéramos	haveremos	haveríamos
plural	2nd	haveis heis (archaic)	houvestes	havíeis	houvéreis	havereis	haveríeis
plural	3rd	hão	houveram	haviam	houveram	haverão	haveriam
number	person	Subjunctive mood					Personal infinitive
number	person	Present	Preterite	Imperfect	Pluperfect	Future	Personal infinitive
singular	1st	haja	tenha havido	houvesse	tivesse havido	houver	haver
singular	2nd	hajas	tenhas havido	houvesses	tivesses havido	houveres	haveres
singular	3rd	haja	tenha havido	houvesse	tivesse havido	houver	haver
plural	1st	hajamos	tenhamos havido	houvéssemos	tivéssemos havido	houvermos	havermos
plural	2nd	hajais	tenhais havido	houvésseis	tivésseis havido	houverdes	haverdes
plural	3rd	hajam	tenham havido	houvessem	tivessem havido	houverem	haverem
Imperative mood				Infinitive		haver	
2nd pers. sing.		há		Past participle		havido	
2nd pers. plur.		havei		Gerund		havendo	

=== pôr - to put ===
number	person	Indicative mood					Conditional
number	person	Present	Preterite	Imperfect	Pluperfect	Future	Conditional
singular	1st	ponho	pus	punha	pusera	porei	poria
singular	2nd	pões	puseste	punhas	puseras	porás	porias
singular	3rd	põe	pôs	punha	pusera	porá	poria
plural	1st	pomos	pusemos	púnhamos	puséramos	poremos	poríamos
plural	2nd	pondes	pusestes	púnheis	puséreis	poreis	poríeis
plural	3rd	põem	puseram	punham	puseram	porão	poriam
Imperative mood				Infinitive		pôr	
2nd pers. sing.		põe		Past participle		posto	
2nd pers. plur.		ponde		Gerund		pondo	

== Conditional and future ==
There are few irregular verbs for these tenses (only dizer, fazer, trazer, and their compounds – also haver, ter, ser, ir, pôr, estar, etc. – for the subjunctive future imperfect). The indicative future imperfect, conditional, and subjunctive future imperfect are formed by adding to the infinitive of the verb the indicative present inflections of the auxiliary verb haver (dropping the h and av), the 2nd/3rd conjugation endings of the preterite, imperfect, and the personal infinitive endings, respectively. Thus, for the majority of verbs, the simple personal infinitive coincides with subjunctive future.

== Imperative ==
The affirmative imperative for second person pronouns tu and vós is obtained from the present indicative, by deletion of the final -s (in some cases, an accent mark must be added to the vowel which precedes it). For other persons, and for negative clauses, the present subjunctive takes the role of imperative.

== Pronunciation of present inflections ==
In the present tense, the stress fluctuates between the root and the termination. As a rule of thumb, the last radical vowel (the one that can be stressed) will retain its original pronunciation when unstressed (atonic) and change into [a], [e/ɛ] (subjunctive or indicative 1st pers sing/infinitive), or [o/ɔ] (subjunctive or indicative 1st pers sing/infinitive) – depending on the vowel in question – in case it is stressed (is in a tonic syllable). Other vowels (u, i) and nasalized vowels (before closed syllables) stay unchanged, as well as the verbs with the diphthongs -ei, -eu, -oi, -ou; they always keep a closed-mid pronunciation; e.g. deixo /ej/ (deixar), endeuso /ew/ (endeusar), açoito /oj/ (açoitar), roubo /ow/ (roubar), etc. Alternation in stem-stressed forms is blocked when a nasal consonant (/m/, /n/ or /ɲ/) follows, in which case the higher alternant (i.e. /ɐ/, /e/ or /o/) is used in all forms. For example, in the verb comer, all of the forms como, comes, come, comem have /o/.

Example: Consider the conjugation of correr (analogous to comer, presented above) in the Indicative Present Simple. The first-person singular corro has [o] in the stressed vowel, while other forms corres, corre, correm have [ɔ].

In Brazil, the following difference applies: Stem-unstressed forms consistently have /o/ or /e/ for most speakers in most verbs, but there are exceptions, with some dialects (e.g. northeastern Brazilian dialects) likely to present an open form /ɔ/ or /ɛ/. At times, the difference is not particularly clear, producing [o̞], [e̞], particularly in transition zones like the states of Rio de Janeiro, Espírito Santo, Minas Gerais and the Federal District of Brasilia, unless vowel harmony is involved (e.g. comove "move, touch (emotionally)" [kɔˈmɔvi]).

This also has repercussions in the imperative and present subjunctive, for their inflections are constructed from the indicative present simple and indicative present simple in the 1st singular person respectively.

=== First conjugation ===
First conjugation		Present								
First conjugation		pelar [pɨˈlaɾ] [peˈlaʁ]			amar [ɐˈmaɾ] [aˈmaʁ]			rendar [ʁẽˈdaɾ] [ʁẽˈdaʁ]		
First conjugation		Indicative	Subjunctive	Imperative	Indicative	Subjunctive	Imperative	Indicative	Subjunctive	Imperative
Singular	1st person	pelo [ˈpɛlu]	pele [ˈpɛlɨ] [ˈpɛli]	—	amo [ˈɐmu] [ˈɐ̃mu]	ame [ˈɐmɨ] [ˈɐ̃mi]	—	rendo [ˈʁẽdu]	rende [ˈʁẽdɨ] [ˈʁẽdᶾi]	—
Singular	2nd person	pelas [ˈpɛlɐʃ] [ˈpɛlɐs]	peles [ˈpɛlɨʃ] [ˈpɛlis]	pela [ˈpɛlɐ]	amas [ˈɐmɐʃ] [ˈɐ̃mɐs]	ames [ˈɐmɨʃ] [ˈɐ̃mis]	ama [ˈɐmɐ] [ˈɐ̃mɐ]	rendas [ˈʁẽdɐʃ] [ˈʁẽdɐs]	rendes [ˈʁẽdɨʃ] [ˈʁẽdᶾis]	renda [ˈʁẽdɐ]
Singular	3rd person	pela [ˈpɛlɐ]	pele [ˈpɛlɨ] [ˈpɛli]		ama [ˈɐmɐ] [ˈɐ̃mɐ]	ame [ˈɐmɨ] [ˈɐ̃mi]		renda [ˈʁẽdɐ]	rende [ˈʁẽdɨ] [ˈʁẽdᶾi]	
Plural	1st person	pelamos [pɨˈlɐmuʃ] [peˈlɐ̃mus]	pelemos [pɨˈlemuʃ] [peˈlẽmus]		amamos [ɐˈmɐmuʃ] [aˈmɐ̃mʊs]	amemos [ɐˈmemuʃ] [aˈmẽmus]		rendamos [ʁẽˈdɐmuʃ] [ʁẽˈdɐ̃mʊs]	rendemos [ʁẽˈdemuʃ] [ʁẽˈdẽmus]	
Plural	2nd person	pelais [pɨˈlajʃ] [peˈlajs]	peleis [pɨˈlejʃ ~ pɨˈlɐjʃ] [peˈlejs]	pelai [pɨˈlaj] [peˈlaj]	amais [ɐˈmajʃ] [aˈmajs]	ameis [ɐˈmejʃ ~ ɐˈmɐjʃ] [aˈmejs]	amai [ɐˈmaj] [aˈmaj]	rendais [ʁẽˈdajʃ] [ʁẽˈdajs]	rendeis [ʁẽˈdejʃ ~ ʁẽˈdɐjʃ] [ʁẽˈdejs]	rendai [ʁẽˈdaj]
Plural	3rd person	pelam [ˈpɛlɐ̃w̃]	pelem [ˈpɛlẽj̃ ~ ˈpɛlɐ̃j̃] [ˈpɛlẽj̃]		amam [ˈɐmɐ̃w̃] [ˈɐ̃mɐ̃w̃]	amem [ˈɐmẽj̃ ~ ˈɐmɐ̃j̃] [ˈɐ̃mẽj̃]		rendam [ˈʁẽdɐ̃w̃]	rendem [ˈʁẽdẽj̃ ~ ˈʁẽdɐ̃j̃] [ˈʁẽdẽj̃]	

=== Second conjugation ===
Second conjugation		Present								
Second conjugation		correr [kuˈʁeɾ] [koˈʁeʁ]			temer [tɨˈmeɾ] [teˈmeʁ]			vender [vẽˈdeɾ] [vẽˈdeʁ]		
Second conjugation		Indicative	Subjunctive	Imperative	Indicative	Subjunctive	Imperative	Indicative	Subjunctive	Imperative
Singular	1st person	corro [ˈkoʁu]	corra [ˈkoʁɐ]	—	temo [ˈtemu] [ˈtẽmu]	tema [ˈtemɐ] [ˈtẽmɐ]	—	vendo [ˈvẽdu]	venda [ˈvẽdɐ]	—
Singular	2nd person	corres [ˈkɔʁɨʃ] [ˈkɔʁis]	corras [ˈkoʁɐʃ] [ˈkoʁɐs]	corre [ˈkɔʁɨ] [ˈkɔʁi]	temes [ˈtɛmɨʃ] [ˈtẽmis]	temas [ˈtemɐʃ] [ˈtẽmɐs]	teme [ˈtɛmɨ] [ˈtẽmi]	vendes [ˈvẽdɨʃ] [ˈvẽdᶾis]	vendas [ˈvẽdɐʃ] [ˈvẽdɐs]	vende [ˈvẽdɨ] [ˈvẽdᶾi]
Singular	3rd person	corre [ˈkɔʁɨ] [ˈkɔʁi]	corra [ˈkoʁɐ]		teme [ˈtɛmɨ] [ˈtẽmi]	tema [ˈtemɐ] [ˈtẽmɐ]		vende [ˈvẽdɨ] [ˈvẽdᶾi]	venda [ˈvẽdɐ]	
Plural	1st person	corremos [kuˈʁemuʃ] [koˈʁẽmus]	corramos [kuˈʁɐmuʃ] [koˈʁɐ̃mus]		tememos [tɨˈmemuʃ] [teˈmẽmus]	temamos [tɨˈmɐmuʃ] [teˈmɐ̃mus]		vendemos [vẽˈdemuʃ] [vẽˈdẽmʊs]	vendamos [vẽˈdɐmuʃ] [vẽˈdɐ̃mus]	
Plural	2nd person	correis [kuˈʁejʃ ~ kuˈʁɐjʃ] [koˈʁejs]	corrais [kuˈʁajʃ] [ˈkoˈʁajs]	correi [kuˈʁej ~ kuˈʁɐj] [koˈʁej]	temeis [tɨˈmejʃ ~ tɨˈmɐjʃ] [teˈmejs]	temais [tɨˈmajʃ] [teˈmajs]	temei [tɨˈmej ~ tɨˈmɐj] [teˈmej]	vendeis [vẽˈdejʃ ~ vẽˈdɐjʃ] [vẽˈdejs]	vendais [vẽˈdajʃ] [vẽˈdajs]	vendei [vẽˈdej ~ vẽˈdɐj] [vẽˈdej]
Plural	3rd person	correm [ˈkɔʁẽj̃ ~ ˈkɔʁɐ̃j̃] [ˈkɔʁẽj̃]	corram [ˈkoʁɐ̃w̃]		temem [ˈtɛmẽj̃ ~ ˈtɛmɐ̃j̃] [ˈtẽmẽj̃]	temam [ˈtemɐ̃w̃] [ˈtẽmɐ̃w̃]		vendem [ˈvẽdẽj̃ ~ ˈvẽdɐ̃j̃] [ˈvẽdẽj̃]	vendam [ˈvẽdɐ̃w̃]	

=== Third conjugation ===
Third conjugation		Present								
Third conjugation		dormir [duɾˈmiɾ] [doʁˈmiʁ]			lenir [lɨˈniɾ] [leˈniʁ]			sentir [sẽˈtiɾ] [sẽˈtᶴiʁ]		
Third conjugation		Indicative	Subjunctive	Imperative	Indicative	Subjunctive	Imperative	Indicative	Subjunctive	Imperative
Singular	1st person	durmo [ˈduɾmu] [ˈduʁmu]	durma [ˈduɾmɐ] [ˈduʁmɐ]	—	leno [ˈlenu] [ˈlẽnu]	lena [ˈlenɐ] [ˈlẽnɐ]	—	sinto [ˈsĩtu]	sinta [ˈsĩtɐ]	—
Singular	2nd person	dormes [ˈdɔɾmɨʃ] [ˈdɔʁmis]	durmas [ˈduɾmɐʃ] [ˈduʁmɐs]	dorme [ˈdɔɾmɨ] [ˈdɔʁmi]	lenes [ˈlɛnɨʃ] [ˈlẽnis]	lenas [ˈlɛnɐʃ] [ˈlẽnɐs]	lene [ˈlɛnɨ] [ˈlẽni]	sentes [ˈsẽtɨʃ] [ˈsẽtᶴis]	sintas [ˈsĩtɐʃ] [ˈsĩtɐs]	sente [ˈsẽtɨ] [ˈsẽtᶴi]
Singular	3rd person	dorme [ˈdɔɾmɨ] [ˈdɔʁmi]	durma [ˈduɾmɐ] [ˈduʁmɐ]		lene [ˈlɛnɨ] [ˈlẽni]	lena [ˈlɛnɐ] [ˈlẽnɐ]		sente [ˈsẽtɨ] [ˈsẽtᶴi]	sinta [ˈsĩtɐ]	
Plural	1st person	dormimos [duɾˈmimuʃ] [doʁˈmĩmus]	durmamos [duɾˈmɐmuʃ] [duʁˈmɐ̃mus]		lenimos [lɨˈnimuʃ] [leˈnĩmus]	lenamos [lɨˈnɐmuʃ] [leˈnɐ̃mus]		sentimos [sẽˈtimuʃ] [sẽˈtᶴĩmus]	sintamos [sĩˈtɐmuʃ] [sĩˈtɐ̃mus]	
Plural	2nd person	dormis [duɾˈmiʃ] [doʁˈmis]	durmais [duɾˈmajʃ] [duʁˈmajs]	dormi [duɾˈmi] [doʁˈmi]	lenis [lɨˈniʃ] [leˈnis]	lenais [lɨˈnajʃ] [leˈnajs]	leni [lɨˈni] [leˈni]	sentis [sẽˈtiʃ] [sẽˈtᶴis]	sintais [sĩˈtajʃ] [sĩˈtajs]	senti [sẽˈti] [sẽˈtᶴi]
Plural	3rd person	dormem [ˈdɔɾmẽj̃ ~ ˈdɔɾmɐ̃j̃] [ˈdɔʁmẽj̃]	durmam [ˈduɾmɐ̃w̃] [ˈduʁmɐ̃w̃]		lenem [ˈlɛnẽj̃ ~ ˈlɛnɐ̃j̃] [ˈlẽnẽj̃]	lenam [ˈlenɐ̃w̃] [ˈlẽnɐ̃w̃]		sentem [ˈsẽtẽj̃ ~ ˈsẽtɐ̃j̃] [ˈsẽtẽj̃]	sintam [ˈsĩtɐ̃w̃]	

== See also ==
- Portuguese grammar
- Portuguese personal pronouns and possessives
- Portuguese phonology
- Wikibooks: Variation of the Portuguese Verbs
