= Ela (name) =

- Pronunciation: [e.ˈlaː]
- Gender: Female
- Language: Turkish

Origin
- Origin: Proto-Turkic
- Derivation: ala
- Meaning: Hazel
- Region of origin: Turkey

Other names
- Variant forms: Elanur, Elanaz, Elasu, İlanur, Elagül

Ela (or Elâ) is a feminine given name of Turkish origin meaning "hazel".

Ela is also an Aramaic feminine given name. It comes from the Aramaic word Elah meaning "oak". It is a nickname for Elen, Eliška, Elizabeth, Elektra, Angela or Eleanor.

== Etymology ==
=== Turkish ===
Ela originates from Ottoman Turkish الا (elâ), meaning "of hazel color", which is derived from the Proto-Turkic *āla, meaning "variegated", "multicolored" or "ambiguous color". It is a variant of Turkish ala. It is also co-origin with the Proto-Turkic *āl, meaning "red".

In contemporary Turkish, ela is also used to refer to hazel eyes.

== Popularity ==
In Turkey, the name was ranked the 17th most commonly given name to baby girls between 2020 and 2021.

== Homonyms ==
The name Ela is often falsely linked to the Persian word اعلی (a'lā), which itself is borrowed from the Arabic أعلى (ʔaʕlā), meaning "elevation" or "superior". The Turkish variant of this Arabic word would be âlâ or Ala as a name, and is unrelated to the Turkish word ala / ela.

== Given name ==
- Ela of Salisbury, 3rd Countess of Salisbury (1187–1261), English noblewoman
- Ela Bhatt (1933–2022), Indian co-operative organiser and activist
- Ela Chapin, American politician from Vermont
- Ela Collins (1786–1848), American lawyer and politician
- Ela Darling (born 1986), American pornographic actress and businesswoman
- Ela Longespee (1244–1276), English heiress
- Ela Gandhi (born 1940), South African politician and activist
- Ela Lehotská (born 1973), Slovak actress
- Ela Naz Özdemir (born 2006), Turkish swimmer
- Ela Q. May, child actress of the Edwardian era
- Ela Orleans (born 1971), Polish composer
- Ela Peroci (1922–2001), Slovene writer
- Ela Pitam (born 1977), Israeli chess grandmaster
- Ela Stein-Weissberger (1930–2018), Czech holocaust survivor
- Ela Velden (born 1972), Mexican actress and model
- Ela To'omaga-Kaikilekofe (born 1969), New Zealand visual artist and arts administrator
- Ela Weber (born 1966), German model, showgirl and actress

== See also ==
- Ela (surname)
