= Eliška =

Eliška is a name for Czech girls, which is rendered Elise in English, German and French.

It may refer to:

- Eliška Bučková (born 1989), Czech model, Czech Miss 2008
- Eliška Junková (1900–1994), Czech automobile racer
- Eliška Kleinová (1912–1999), Czech Jewish pianist, music educator, and sister of Gideon Klein
- Eliška Krásnohorská (1847–1926), Czech feminist author
- Eliška Misáková (1926–1948), Czech gymnast
- Eliška Řeháková (1846–1916), Czech teacher, translator, journalist and suffragist
- Eliška Wagnerová (1948–2025), Czech judge

== See also ==
- Eliska Cross (born 1986), French actress
- Radomil Eliška (born 1931), Czech conductor
