= Personal pronouns in Portuguese =

The Portuguese personal pronouns and possessives display a higher degree of inflection than other parts of speech. Personal pronouns have distinct forms according to whether they stand for a subject (nominative), a direct object (accusative), an indirect object (dative), or a reflexive object. Several pronouns further have special forms used after prepositions.

The possessive pronouns are the same as the possessive adjectives, but each is inflected to express the grammatical person of the possessor and the grammatical gender of the possessed.

Pronoun use displays considerable variation with register and dialect, with particularly pronounced differences between the most colloquial varieties of European Portuguese and Brazilian Portuguese.

== Subject, object, and complement ==
=== Basic forms ===
The personal pronouns of Portuguese have three basic forms: subject, object (object of a verb), and prepositional (object of a preposition).

number	person	subject	object of verb	object of preposition
singular	1st	eu	me	mim
singular	2nd	tu	te	ti
singular	3rd	ele, ela, você	o, a^{1}; lhe^{2}; se^{3}	ele, ela; si^{3}
plural	1st	nós	nos	nós
plural	2nd	vós	vos	vós
plural	3rd	eles, elas, vocês	os, as^{1}; lhes^{2}; se^{3}	eles, elas; si^{3}

^{1} direct object (masculine and feminine)
^{2} indirect object
^{3} reflexive or reciprocal, direct or indirect object

=== Subject pronouns ===
==== Forms of address ====
Like most European languages, Portuguese has different words for "you", according to the degree of formality that the speaker wishes to show towards the addressee (T-V distinction). In very broad terms, tu, você (both meaning singular "you") and vocês (plural "you") are used in informal situations, while in formal contexts o senhor, a senhora, os senhores and as senhoras (masculine singular, feminine singular, masculine plural, and feminine plural "you", respectively) are preferred. However, there is considerable regional variation in the use of these terms, and more specific forms of address are sometimes employed.

Generally speaking, tu is the familiar form of address used with family, friends, and minors. Você indicates distance without deference, and tends to be used between people who are, roughly, social equals. O senhor / a senhora (literally "the sir / the madam") are the most ceremonious forms of address. English speakers may find the latter construction akin to the parliamentary convention of referring to fellow legislators in the third person (as "my colleague", "the gentleman", "the member", etc.), although the level of formality conveyed by o senhor is not as great. In fact, variants of o senhor and a senhora with more nuanced meanings such as titles as o professor ("the professor"), o doutor ("the doctor"), o colega ("the colleague") and o pai ("the father") are also employed as personal pronouns. In the plural, there are two main levels of politeness, the informal vocês or vós and the formal os senhores / as senhoras.

This threefold scheme is, however, complicated by regional and social variation. For example, in many communities of Brazilian Portuguese speakers, the traditional tu/você distinction has been lost, and the previously formal você tends to replace the familiar tu in most cases (the distinction remains, however, in most parts of the country). On the other hand, in Portugal it is common to use a person's own name as a pronoun more or less equivalent to você, e.g., o José, o senhor Silva, which is rare in Brazil (though it is found in parts of the Northeast region, for example). The explicit use of "você" may be discouraged in Portugal because it may sound too informal for many situations. In Mozambique, however, the use of the imperative neutralizes the forms of the 2nd person singular (tu) and (você/senhor). Thus, forms of the imperative with features [+ informal] associated with the pronoun [- informal] (você/senhor) are observable. Also if find shapes with features [+ formal] associated with the pronoun [- formal] (tu)

When addressing older people or hierarchical superiors, modern BP speakers often replace você/tu and vocês with the expressions o(s) senhor(es) and a(s) senhora(s), which also require third-person verb forms and third-person reflexive/possessive pronouns (or, for the possessive, the expressions de vocês, do senhor, etc.). The expressions o(s) senhor(es) and a(s) senhora(s) are also used in formal contexts in modern EP, in addition to a large number of similar pronominalized nouns that vary according to the person who is being addressed, e.g. a menina, o pai, a mãe, o engenheiro, o doutor, etc.

Historically, você derives from vossa mercê ("your mercy" or "your grace") via the intermediate forms vossemecê and vosmecê.

==== Nós vs. a gente ====
A common colloquial alternative to the first-person-plural pronoun nós "we" is the noun phrase a gente (literally meaning "the people"), which formally takes verbs and possessives of the third person singular (or the expression "da gente"). Although avoided in the most formal registers, it is not considered incorrect, unless it is accompanied by verbs conjugated in the first person plural, as in "*A gente moramos na cidade", instead of the normative "A gente mora na cidade" "We live in the city".

==== Vós ====
In nearly all Portuguese dialects and registers, the second-person plural subject pronoun vós is usually replaced by vocês and in many cases it is no longer in use, as is the case with its corresponding verb forms. Currently, vós (with its verb forms) is frequently employed only in the following contexts:

- In some dialects of northern Portugal (i.e., in the colloquial spoken language).
- In some forms of address (e.g. Vossa Senhoria, Vossa Santidade...)
- In religious texts and services.
- In old texts.
- In formal registers being used as a singular second-person pronoun, for archaism.
- In historical fiction.

For this reason, many associate the pronoun with solemnity or formality, not knowing that vós is used for plural in the same context as tu is used for singular.

Instead, the word vocês is used, or equivalent forms of address which take verbs and possessives of the third-person plural. In European Portuguese, however, object vos as well as convosco (but not prepositional vós) and vosso have survived, even in formal situations; see the "Forms of address" section, above, and also the notes on colloquial usage, at the bottom of the page.

=== Object pronouns ===
==== Proclisis, enclisis, and mesoclisis ====
As in other Romance languages, object pronouns are clitics, which must come next to a verb, and are pronounced together with it as a unit. They may appear before the verb (proclisis, lhe dizer), after the verb, linked to it with a hyphen (enclisis, dizer-lhe), or, more rarely, within the verb, between its stem and its desinence (mesoclisis, dir-lhe-ei).

Enclisis and mesoclisis may entail some historically motivated changes of verb endings and/or pronouns, e.g. cantar + o (originally *lo, from Latin illum) = cantá-lo "to sing it". The direct and indirect object pronouns can be contracted, as in dar + lhe + os = dar-lhos "to give them to him"; cf. Spanish dar + le + los = dárselos.

comprá-lo-ei = comprarei (Late Latin comparāre habeō, two words) + o "I will buy it".
dar-to-ia = daria (dare habēbam) + te + o "I would give it to you".
dar-lho-ia = daria + lhe + o "I would give it to him".

When a verb conjugated in the 1st person plural, ending in -s, is followed by the enclitic pronoun nos or vos, the s is dropped: Vamo-nos [vamos + nos] embora amanhã ("We are leaving tomorrow"), Respeitemo-nos [respeitemos + nos] mutuamente ("Let's respect each other"), Vemo-vos [vemos + vos] ("We see you"), etc.

==== Allomorphs ====
Third person direct object clitic pronouns have several forms, depending on their position with relation to the verb and on the verb's ending. If the pronoun is enclitic and the verb ends with a consonant, or if the pronoun is mesoclitic and the root of the verb ends with a consonant, then that consonant is elided, and an l is added to the beginning of the pronoun. If the pronoun is enclitic and the verb ends with a nasal diphthong (spelled -ão, -am, -em, -ém, -êm, -õe, or -õem), an n is added to the beginning of the pronoun. The same happens after other clitic pronouns, and after the adverbial particle eis.

default	after a consonant (-r, -s, -z)	after a nasal diphthong (-m)
o	lo	no
a	la	na
os	los	nos
as	las	nas

The third person forms o, a, os, and as may present the variants lo, la, los, las, no, na, nos, and nas:

- The variants lo, la, los, and las are used after verbal forms ending with a consonant, which is elided. Examples: seduz + a = sedu-la, faz + o = fá-lo, diz + o = di-lo, destróis + os = destrói-los (different from destrói-os, in which the verb is conjugated in the imperative mood), comes + a = come-la (different from come-a = come + a), apanha-las (apanhas + as), amá-lo (amar +o), fazê-lo (fazer + o), partire-lo (partires +o), tem-la (tens + a—the n changes to m). Exceptionally, quer + o gives quere-o, rather than *qué-lo (qué-lo is still permitted, but uncommon).
  - This also occurs when the pronoun is in mesoclitic position: matá-lo-ás (matarás + o), fá-lo-ias (farias + o), feri-lo-ias (feririas + o), comê-lo-ias (comerias + o).
- The variants no, na, nos and nas are used after a verbal form ending with a nasal diphthong. Examples: põe-no (põe + o), tem-na (tem + a), comeram-nos (ambiguous, can mean comeram + os "they ate them", or comeram + nos "they ate us").
- The pronouns o, etc. present the same forms as above when they follow other clitic pronouns, such as nos and vos, or the adverbial particle eis. Examples: ei-lo aqui (eis + o), deram-no-lo (deram + nos + o), "Não vo-lo [vos + o] quero dar a entender."

==== Contractions between clitic pronouns ====
indirect object	direct object			
indirect object	o	a	os	as
me	mo	ma	mos	mas
te	to	ta	tos	tas
lhe, lhes	lho	lha	lhos	lhas
nos	no-lo	no-la	no-los	no-las
vos	vo-lo	vo-la	vo-los	vo-las

The contraction for lhes + o is lho, not *lhe-lo or *lhos. This occurs because lhe used to be employed indistinctly for the singular and the plural and, while the agglutinated form suffered no alteration, lhe evolved into lhes for the plural number.

These contracted forms are rarely encountered in modern Brazilian usage.

==== Syntax ====
Apart from the pronouns that act as subjects of a sentence, and from the stressed object pronouns which are employed after prepositions, Portuguese has several clitic object pronouns used with nonprepositional verbs, or as indirect objects. These can appear before the verb as separate words, as in ela me ama ("she loves me"), or appended to the verb after the tense/person inflection, as in ele amou-a ("he loved her") or ele deu-lhe o livro ("he gave her/him the book"). Note that Portuguese spelling rules (like those of French) require a hyphen between the verb and the enclitic pronoun.

In West Iberian-Romance, the position of clitic object pronouns with respect to the verbs which govern them was flexible, but all Romance languages have since adopted a more strict syntax. The usual pattern is for clitics to precede the verb; e.g. Sp. Yo te amo, Fr. Je t'aime "I love you"; Fr. Tu m'avais dit "You had told me" (proclisis). The opposite order occurs only with the imperative: Sp. Dime, Fr. Dis-moi "Tell me" (enclisis). Spoken Brazilian Portuguese has taken more or less the same route, except that clitics usually appear between the auxiliary verb and the main verb in compound tenses, and proclisis is even more generalized: Eu te amo "I love you", but Me diz "Tell me", and Você tinha me dito "You had told me".

In European Portuguese, by contrast, enclisis is the default position for clitic pronouns in simple affirmative clauses: Eu amo-te "I love you", Diz-me "Tell me". In compound tenses, the clitic normally follows the auxiliary verb, Você tinha-me dito "You had told me" (like in Brazilian Portuguese, but conventionally spelled with a hyphen), though other positions are sometimes possible: Você vai dizer-me "You are going to tell me" (Spanish allows this syntax as well, for example Vas a decirme), Você não me vai dizer "You are not going to tell me". Still, in formal Portuguese the clitic pronouns always follow the verb in the infinitive. The Brazilian proclisis is usually correct in European Portuguese (often found in medieval literature), though nowadays uncommon and emphatic. Only sentences that begin with a clitic pronoun, such as Te amo or Me diz, are considered unacceptable in European Portuguese.

With verbs in the future indicative tense or the conditional tense, enclitic pronouns are not placed after the verb, but rather incorporated into it: eu canto-te uma balada "I sing you a ballad" becomes eu cantar-te-ei uma balada "I will sing you a ballad" in the future, and eu cantar-te-ia uma balada "I would sing you a ballad" in the conditional (mesoclisis).

This is because these verb forms were originally compounds of the infinitive and haver: cantarei = cantar hei, cantarás = cantar hás. In spoken Brazilian Portuguese, where proclisis is nearly universal, mesoclisis never occurs. Although the mesoclisis is often cited as a distinctive feature of Portuguese, it is becoming rare in spoken European Portuguese, since there is a growing tendency to replace the future indicative and the conditional with other tenses.

Although enclisis is the default position for clitic pronouns in European Portuguese in simple affirmative sentences, there are several instances in which proclisis will be used due to certain elements or words that "attract" the pronoun to appear before, rather than after, the verb. For example, a simple affirmative sentence or command will be enclitic (mesoclitic in the future or conditional). However, the following elements attract the pronoun and cause proclisis even in European Portuguese: (1) negative words, (2) interrogative words, (3) conjunctions/dependent clauses, (4) certain common adverbs such as ainda, já, sempre, etc., and (5) indefinite pronouns such as todos. Since proclisis is already the normal default position for clitic pronouns in Brazilian Portuguese, this marking between enclisis and proclisis does not exist.

Clitic placement in Portuguese
	European Portuguese	Formal Brazilian Portuguese	Colloquial Brazilian Portuguese	Nonstandard Brazilian Portuguese	English
Simple affirmative sentence	Ele viu-nos hoje.		Ele viu a gente hoje./Ele nos viu hoje.	Ele viu nós hoje./Ele hoje viu nós.	He saw us today.
Affirmative future tense	Ele aprendê-lo-á na escola.	Ele irá aprendê-lo na escola.	Ele o aprenderá na escola.	Isso aí ele vai aprender na escola./Ele vai aprender isso aí na escola.	He will learn it in school.
Affirmative conditional tense	Ele dar-me-ia o livro.		Ele me daria o livro./Ele iria me dar o livro.	Ele iria dar o livro pra mim/eu.	He would give me the book.
Affirmative imperative	Diga-me o que aconteceu.		Me fala/fale/diz/diga o que aconteceu.	Fala/diz pra mim o que aconteceu.	Tell me what happened.
(1) Negative sentences	Não a vi hoje.			Não vi ela hoje.	I did not see her today.
(2) Interrogative sentences	Onde é que ele os comprou? (ex. os sapatos)			Onde é que ele comprou eles? (ex. os sapatos)	Where did he buy them (ex. those shoes)?
(3) Conjunctions/dependent clauses	Quero que me digas a verdade.		Quero que tu/você me digas/diga a verdade.	Quero que tu fale/diga a verdade p'ra mim/eu.	I want you to tell me the truth.
(4) Adverbs	Ele sempre nos vê na igreja.		Ele sempre vê a gente na igreja./Ele sempre nos vê na igreja.	Ele vê nós na igreja sempre./Ele sempre vê nós na igreja.	He always sees us at church.
(5) Indefinite pronouns	Todos me dizem a verdade.		Todo mundo me fala/diz a verdade.	Todo mundo fala/diz a verdade p'ra mim/eu.	Everyone tells me the truth.

=== Prepositional pronouns ===
==== Governance ====
The personal pronouns labelled "object of preposition" above are always employed after a preposition, and most prepositions govern those pronouns, but a few of them require subject pronouns. For example, prepositions denoting exception, such as afora, fora, excepto, menos, salvo, and tirante. In those cases, the subject pronouns eu, tu, ele, ela, eles and elas are used. Examples: Todos foram ao cinema excepto eu, Ele referiu toda a gente excepto ele mesmo (not *Ele referiu toda a gente excepto si), but Ele referiu-se a toda a gente excepto a si, Falaste a todos menos a mim, Falaste com todos menos comigo (not *com eu).

==== Contractions with the prepositions de and em ====
The following 3rd person pronouns contract with the prepositions de "of/from" and em "in/on/at".

pronoun	contracted with de	contracted with em
ele	dele	nele
ela	dela	nela
eles	deles	neles
elas	delas	nelas

==== Contractions with the preposition com ====
The following prepositional pronouns contract with the preposition com "with" (circumstantial complement).

pronoun	contracted form
mim	comigo
ti	contigo
si	consigo
nós	co(n)nosco
vós	convosco
si	consigo

The form connosco is used in European Portuguese, while conosco is used in Brazilian Portuguese.

These contractions are derived from the Latin practice of suffixing the preposition cum "with" to the end of the ablative form of personal pronouns, as in mecum or tecum. In Vulgar Latin, enclitic cum (later shifted to -go) became fossilized and was reanalysed as part of the pronoun itself. Then, a second cum began to be used before those words, and finally cum mecum, cum tecum, etc. contracted, producing comigo, contigo, and so on.

=== Reflexive pronouns ===
Reflexive pronouns are used when one wants to express the action is exercised upon the same person that exercises it or refers to such person. Examples:

- EP: Eu vi-me ao espelho. BP: Eu me vi no espelho.
- Não te levas muito a sério.
- EP: De repente, vimo-nos perdidos na floresta. BP: De repente, nos vimos perdidos na floresta.

In the third person, the reflexive pronoun has a form of its own, se, or si if preceded by a preposition. Examples:

- EP: Hoje ele levantou-se cedo. BP: Hoje ele se levantou cedo.
- EP: Eles lavam-se sempre muito bem. BP: Eles se lavam sempre muito bem.
- O gato sabe cuidar bem de si.
- Os ladrões levaram consigo tudo o que puderam. (see above for compounds with com)

The reflexive pronoun forms, when used in the plural (me and te are therefore excluded), may indicate reciprocity. In those cases, they do not have reflexive character – for instance, as pessoas cumprimentaram-se does not mean that each person complimented him-/herself, rather they complimented each other. In some situations, this may create ambiguity; therefore, if one means "they love each other", one might want to say eles amam-se mutuamente or eles amam-se um ao outro (although eles amam-se will probably be interpreted this way anyhow); if one means "each one of them loves him-/herself", one should say eles amam-se a si mesmos ou eles amam-se a si próprios.

Sometimes, especially in the spoken Portuguese, ele mesmo, ela mesma, com ele mesmo, com eles mesmos, etc. may be used instead of si and consigo. Example: "Eles têm de ter confiança neles [em + eles] mesmos" or Eles têm de ter confiança em si (mesmos).

== Possessive pronouns and adjectives ==
The forms of the possessives depends on the gender and number of the possessed object or being.

possessor	possessum			
possessor	masc. sing.	fem. sing.	masc. plur.	fem. plur.
eu	meu	minha	meus	minhas
tu	teu	tua	teus	tuas
ele, ela, você	seu	sua	seus	suas
nós	nosso	nossa	nossos	nossas
vós	vosso	vossa	vossos	vossas
eles, elas, vocês	seu	sua	seus	suas

The possessive pronouns are identical to possessive adjectives, except that they must be preceded by the definite article (o meu, a minha, os meus, as minhas, etc.) For the possessive adjectives, the article is optional, and its use varies with dialect and degree of formality.

=== Clearing ambiguity in the 3rd person ===
Due to the use of seu(s), sua(s) as 2nd-person possessive pronouns, dele(s) and dela(s) are normally used as 3rd-person possessive markers in lieu of seu(s)/sua(s) to eliminate ambiguity, e.g. Onde está o seu carro ("Where is your car?") vs. Onde está o carro dele? ("Where is his car?"). Seu/Sua used as 3rd-person possessive pronouns are still frequent, especially when referring to the subject of the clause or when the gender is unknown and ambiguity can be solved in context, e.g. O Candidato Geraldo Alckmin apresentou ontem a sua proposta para aumentar a geração de empregos no Brasil ("The candidate Geraldo Alckmin presented yesterday his proposal to increase job creation in Brazil").

== Colloquial usage ==
=== In European Portuguese ===
In European Portuguese, si and consigo can also be used to refer to the person to whom the message is directed in the formal treatment by o senhor, etc. or in the treatment by você. They are employed in the same circumstances ti and contigo would be used in the treatment by tu. Actually, in those circumstances você and com você is uncommonly used and considered incorrect.

Examples:

- Se você não se importar, eu vou consigo. "I'll go with you, if you don't mind." (Se você não se importar, eu vou com você would sound strange in some regions and is generally considered a wrong construction.)
- Quando estava a passar pela Praça do Chile, lembrei-me de si. "When I was going through the Praça do Chile (the Chile park), it reminded me of you."

Thus, in modern colloquial European Portuguese, the classical paradigm above is modified to (differences emphasized):

Subject	Register	Object of verb	Object of preposition	Reflexive	Possessive
você "you", sing.	classical	o, a; lhe, você	você, com você	se, si, consigo	seu, sua, seus, suas; de você
você "you", sing.	colloquial	o, a; lhe, você	si, consigo	se, si, consigo	seu, sua, seus, suas; de você
vocês "you", plur.	classical	os, as; lhes; vocês	vocês, com vocês	se, si, consigo	seu, sua, seus, suas; de vocês
vocês "you", plur.	colloquial	vos	vocês, convosco	se, si, consigo	vosso, vossa, vossos, vossas

Se, si, and consigo are used in standard written BP exclusively as reflexive pronouns, e.g. Os manifestantes trouxeram consigo paus e pedras para se defenderem da violência policial ("Protesters brought (wood) sticks and stones with them to protect themselves against police brutality"), or Os políticos discutiam entre si o que fazer diante da decisão do Supremo Tribunal ("Politicians discussed among themselves what to do in face of the Supreme Court decision"). In colloquial language, those reflexive forms may be replaced however by subject pronouns (e.g. Discutam entre vocês em que data preferem fazer o exame vs standard Discutam entre si em que data preferem fazer o exame, Eng. "Discuss among yourselves when you prefer to take the exam"). Note also that in both standard and colloquial BP, it is considered wrong to use se, si, consigo in non-reflexive contexts. Therefore, unlike in modern colloquial EP, para si for example cannot ordinarily replace para você, nor can consigo ordinarily replace com você.

=== In Brazilian Portuguese ===
For modern Brazilian Portuguese, one could propose the following chart (departures from the norm are in italics):

Subject	Register	Object	Possessive	Verb
tu "you", sing. fam.	classical	te, ti, contigo	teu, tua, teus, tuas	és (2nd pers. sing.)
tu "you", sing. fam.	colloquial	te, ti, tu, contigo; você, você (after a verb), com você	teu, tua, teus, tuas; seu, sua, seus, suas	é (3rd pers. sing.)
você "you", sing.	classical	o, a; lhe; você, com você; si, consigo	seu, sua, seus, suas; de você	é (3rd pers. sing.)
você "you", sing.	colloquial	você (after a verb); você, com você; si, consigo; te, ti, tu, contigo	seu, sua, seus, suas; de você; teu, tua, teus, tuas	é (3rd pers. sing.)
ele, ela "he", "she"	classical	o, a; lhe; si, consigo	seu, sua, seus, suas; dele, dela	é (3rd pers. sing.)
ele, ela "he", "she"	colloquial	ele, ela (after a verb); si, consigo	seu, sua, seus, suas; dele, dela	é (3rd pers. sing.)
nós "we", "us"	classical	nos; conosco	nosso, nossa, nossos, nossas	somos (1st pers. plur.)
nós "we", "us"	colloquial	nos; conosco; a gente (after a verb), com a gente, com nós	nosso, nossa, nossos, nossas; da gente	somos (1st pers. plur.), é (3rd pers.)
a gente "we", "us"	colloquial	a gente (after a verb), nos; com a gente, conosco, com nós	da gente, nosso, nossa, nossos, nossas	é, (3rd pers. sing.) somos (1st pers. plur.)
vocês "you", plur.	classical	os, as; lhes, vocês; si, consigo	seu, sua, seus, suas; de vocês	são (3rd pers. plur.)
vocês "you", plur.	colloquial	vocês (after a verb); si, consigo	seu, sua, seus, suas; de vocês	são (3rd pers. plur.)
eles, elas "they", masc. and fem.	classical	os, as; lhes; si, consigo	seu, sua, seus, suas; deles, delas	são (3rd pers. plur.)
eles, elas "they", masc. and fem.	colloquial	eles, elas (after a verb); si, consigo	seu, sua, seus, suas; deles, delas	são (3rd pers. plur.)

==== Tu vs. você ====
Although the 3rd person pronoun você tended to replace the classical 2nd-person pronoun tu in several Brazilian dialects and, especially, in the media communication, the use of tu is still frequent in several Brazilian Portuguese dialects. Most of the dialects that retain tu also use accordingly te (accusative pronoun), ti (dative postprepositional pronoun), contigo, and the possessive teu, tua, teus, and tuas. The use of tu is dominant in the South (Rio Grande do Sul, Santa Catarina and parts of Paraná) and Northeast (with the exception of most of Bahia and some other areas, mostly in the coast), and it is also very frequent in the Northern region and Rio de Janeiro.

However, even in some of the regions where você is the prevailing pronoun, the object pronoun te and ti and the possessive pronoun teu/tua are quite common, although not in most of São Paulo, Brazil's most populous state. In fact, in the city of São Paulo the pronoun tu is almost nonexistent.

That distinction, object and possessive pronouns pattern likewise, is still maintained in the South and in the area around the city of Santos (in State of São Paulo) and in the Northeast. In Rio Grande do Sul and Santa Catarina, for instance, você is rarely used in spoken language—in most occasions, o senhor/a senhora is employed whenever tu may sound too informal.

In most of the Northeast, você is frequently used only in semi-formal and formal conversations, mostly with people whom one does not know well or when a more polite or serious style is required. As for Rio de Janeiro and the North of Brazil, both tu and você (and associated object and possessive pronouns) are used with no clear distinction in their use.

However, when one talks to older people or people of higher status (a boss, for example), most Brazilians prefer to use o senhor and a senhora.

In standard Portuguese (both in Brazil and in Portugal), você and vocês are always accompanied by 3rd-person verb forms (e.g. você é, vocês são), whereas tu requires 2nd-person verb forms (e.g. tu és). However, in tuteante BP dialects like gaúcho, tu is almost always accompanied by 3rd-person verb forms, e.g. tu é, tu bebeu vs. standard tu és, tu bebeste. That particular usage is considered ungrammatical by most Brazilian speakers whose dialects do not include tu (e.g. paulistanos).

The você (subj.) / te (obj.) combination, e.g. Você sabe que eu te amo, is a well-known peculiarity of modern General Brazilian Portuguese and is similar in nature to the vocês (subj.) / vos (obj.) / vosso (poss.) combination found in modern colloquial European Portuguese. Both combinations would be condemned, though, by prescriptive school grammars based on the classical language.

When Brazilians use tu, it is mostly accompanied by the 3rd-person verb conjugation: Tu vai ao banco? — "Will you go to the bank?" (Tu vai is wrong according to the standard grammar, yet is still used by many Brazilians). The pronoun tu accompanied by the second-person verb can still be found in Maranhão, Piauí, Pernambuco (mostly in more formal speech) and Santa Catarina, for instance, and in a few cities in Rio Grande do Sul near the border with Uruguay, with a slightly different pronunciation in some conjugations (tu vieste — "you came" — is pronounced as if it were tu viesse), which also is present in Santa Catarina and Pernambuco (especially in Recife, where it is by far the predominant way to pronounce the past tense particle -ste).

===== 2nd person singular conjugation in Brazilian Portuguese =====
The table for 2nd person singular conjugation in Brazilian Portuguese is presented below:

	você (standard)	você (colloquial)	tu (standard)	tu (colloquial)	tu (Sulista colloquial)
Present indicative	fala		falas	fala	
Past indicative	falou		falaste	falou	falaste, falasse, falou
Imperfect subjunctive	falasse		falasses	falasse	
Imperative positive	fale	fala, fale	fala	fala, fale	
Imperative negative	não fale	não fale, não fala	não fales	não fale, não fala	
Reflexive	se parece		te pareces	se parece, te parece	

==== O(s) and a(s) ====
In Brazil, the weak clitic pronouns -o(s) and -a(s) are used almost exclusively in writing or in formal speech (e.g. TV newscasts). In colloquial speech, ele(s) and ela(s) replace the clitics as direct objects (e.g. Vi eles na praia ontem versus Vi-os na praia ontem; in English, "I saw them on the beach yesterday"). The standard written variants -lo(s) and -la(s) (used after an infinitive ending in r) are more frequent though in the speech of polite speakers, but seem to be losing ground as well. Note, however, that ele(s) or ela(s) are never used as direct objects in formal writing, such as newspaper articles, academic papers, or legal documents. The use of -lo, -la, etc. replacing "você" as direct object is restricted mostly to the written language (in particular, movie subtitles) although it occurs frequently in a few fixed expressions like Prazer em conhecê-lo ("Pleased to meet you") or Posso ajudá-lo? ("May I help you?").

==== Lhe(s) ====
The use of lhe and lhes as indirect object forms of você and vocês ("[to] you", plural and singular) is currently rare in General BP, where lhe is often replaced as noted above by te or, alternatively, by para você. On the other hand, lheísmo, i.e. the use of lhe not only as an indirect object (e.g. Eu lhe dou meu endereço, "I will give you my address"), but also as a direct object (e.g. Eu lhe vi na praia ontem, Eng. "I saw you at the beach yesterday") is frequent in Northeastern Brazilian dialects, especially in Bahia.

In standard written BP, it is common to use lhe(s) as indirect object forms of ele(s)/ela(s) ("[to] him / her / it / them"), e.g. O presidente pediu que lhe dessem notícias da crise na Bolívia. In the colloquial language, 'lhe' in that context is frequently replaced by para ele, etc., although educated speakers might use lhe in speech as well.

==== Replacement of object pronouns with subject pronouns ====
In nonstandard BP, especially in regional dialects, object pronouns may be avoided altogether, even in the first person. For example: Ele levou nós no baile (standard BP Ele nos levou ao baile) or Ela viu eu na escola (standard BP Ela me viu na escola).

== See also ==
- Portuguese verb conjugation
- Portuguese language
- Portuguese grammar
- Brazilian Portuguese
- Gender neutrality in Portuguese
