= Ruslan Elá =

Equatoguinean footballer (born 1983)

Personal information
- Full name: Ruslan Elá Ayana
- Date of birth: 7 November 1983 (age 42)
- Place of birth: Las Palmas, Spain
- Height: 1.79 m (5 ft 10 in)
- Position: Defender

Youth career
- 1998–1999: San Gabriel
- 1999–2000: Damm
- 2000–2001: Horta
- 2001: Hospitalet
- 2001–2002: Southampton

Senior career*
Years	Team	Apps	(Gls)
2002–2003	Sporting Mahonés		
2003	Villanueva		
2003–2004	Lumbreras		
2004	Logroñés		
2004–2005	Villanovense	9	(0)
2005–2006	Benicarló	4	(0)
2006	Logroñés		
2006–2007	Blanes		
2007	Gavà	0	(0)
2007–2008	Masnou		
2008–2011	Levante Las Planas		

International career
2003–2006	Equatorial Guinea	6	(?)
- * Club domestic league appearances and goals

Ruslan Elá Ayana (born 7 November 1983) is a former footballer who played as a left-back or a centre-back. Born in Spain, he played for the Equatorial Guinea national team.

== Club career ==
Elá was born in Las Palmas, Canary Islands, Spain. In his nine-year senior career he never played in higher than the Spanish fourth division, representing CF Sporting Mahonés, CD Villanueva, CD Lumbreras, CD Logroñés (two spells), CF Villanovense, CD Benicarló, CD Blanes, CF Gavà, CD Masnou and FC Levante Las Planas, retiring at only 27.

== International career ==
Elá earned six caps for Equatorial Guinea. Two of those arrived during the 2006 FIFA World Cup qualifiers, in the tie against Togo national football team (1–0 home win, 0–2 away loss).

== Personal life ==
Elá's older brother, Jacinto, was also a footballer. A winger, he too played mostly in Spanish amateur football, having an unsuccessful spell with Southampton.

Ruslan also worked at Admissions Test de Nivell in Esplugues de Llobregat.
