= European Lift Association =

- Location: Glaverbel Building - Chaussée de la Hulpe 166, box 18, B-1170 Brussels, Belgium
- Website: www.ela-aisbl.org

The European Lift Association (ELA) is a trade association based in Belgium that represents the lifts, escalators and moving walks associations of the European Union (EU) and the European Free Trade Area (EFTA).
