= Jacinto Elá =

Equatoguinean footballer (born 1982)

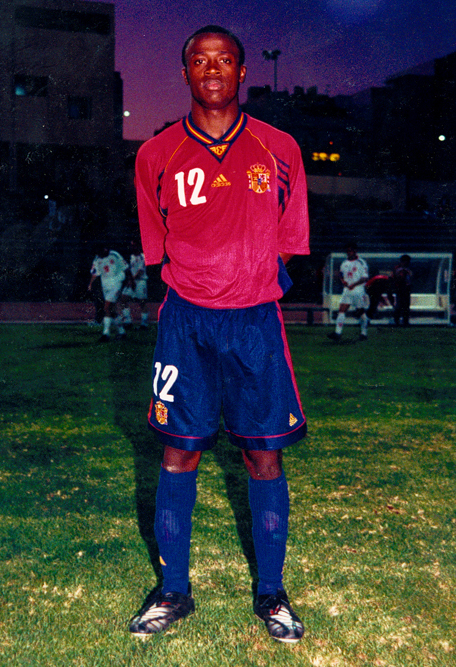
- Elá in training camp with Spain U18

Personal information
- Full name: Jacinto Elá Eyene
- Date of birth: 2 May 1982 (age 44)
- Place of birth: Añisoc, Equatorial Guinea
- Height: 1.75 m (5 ft 9 in)
- Position: Winger

Youth career
- 1992–1995: Sector Sant Feliu
- 1995–1996: Hospitalet
- 1996–2001: Espanyol

Senior career*
| Years | Team | Apps | (Gls) |
| 1999–2001 | Espanyol B | 31 | (5) |
| 1999 | Espanyol | 0 | (0) |
| 2001–2004 | Southampton | 0 | (0) |
| 2002–2003 | → Hércules (loan) | 17 | (0) |
| 2004–2005 | Alavés B | 26 | (5) |
| 2005 | Dundee | 2 | (0) |
| 2006 | Gavà | 16 | (2) |
| 2007 | Gramenet | 8 | (0) |
| 2007–2008 | Fundación Logroñés | 18 | (2) |
| 2008 | Premià | 13 | (2) |
| 2008–2010 | Levante Las Planas | | |
| Total | | 131 | (16) |

International career
| 2000–2001 | Spain U18 | 11 | (5) |
| 2006–2007 | Equatorial Guinea U23 | 4 | (0) |
- * Club domestic league appearances and goals

Jacinto Elá Eyene (born 2 May 1982) is an Equatoguinean retired professional footballer who played predominantly as a right winger.

== Club career ==
Born in Añisoc, Elá moved to Barcelona at the age of ten with his parents. He played most of his youth football with Espanyol (five years), being selected to Spain's youth teams whilst with the club and also helping the reserves promote to Segunda División B in 2000; the following year, he won the Copa del Rey Juvenil with the juniors.

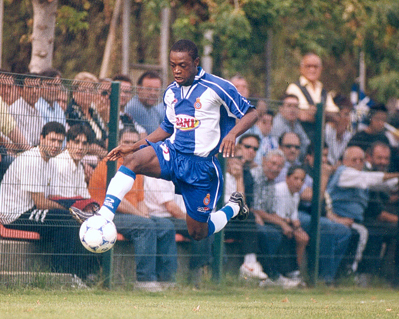
Elá playing for Espanyol B.

On 24 July 1999, Elá made his competitive debut with Espanyol's first team, appearing in a UEFA Intertoto Cup game against Montpellier in France, as a 70th-minute substitute (1–2 loss). It was his only appearance for the Catalans.

In the 2001 off-season, Elá signed for Southampton in England, penning a three-year contract after turning down Coventry City. During his spell he never appeared officially with the Premier League side, being limited to reserve team football; additionally, in the 2001–02 season, he suffered a serious knee injury.

In 2002, Elá was loaned to Hércules in the Spanish third level, under former Sporting Gijón and Tenerife player Felipe Miñambres. In March 2003, in a friendly match with Elche, he suffered another severe injury to his knee, after a hard tackle by Raúl Pérez; upon his return to the Saints, he continued to appear exclusively for the second team.

In August 2005, Elá signed for Dundee of the Scottish Football League First Division. His output consisted of two league matches, plus two appearances in the Challenge Cup and one in the League Cup, going scoreless in the process; he left the club in late November.

From 2005 until his retirement in 2010 at the age of only 28, Elá played exclusively in amateur football, the sole exception being eight third level games for Gramenet in the 2006–07 campaign.

== Post-retirement / Personal life ==
After retiring, Elá returned to Barcelona and started his own clothing line, Malabona (a combination of "Malabo" and "Barcelona"), working alongside his wife Esther in the design of T-shirts and all kinds of fashion clothes, which were then sold via the internet.

His younger brother, Ruslan, was also a footballer. A defender, he represented the Equatoguinean national team.
