= 2025 Kings World Cup Clubs =

International seven-a-side football competition

Tournament details
- Host country: France
- Dates: June 1–14
- Teams: 32
- Venues: 2 (in 1 host city)

Final positions
- Champions: (Spain) Los Troncos FC (1st title)
- Runners-up: (Spain) Porcinos FC

Tournament statistics
- Top scorer: (Spain) Gilles Vidal (Porcinos FC) (11 goals)
- Best player: (Spain) Gerard Nolla (Los Troncos FC)
- Best goalkeeper: (Spain) Eloy Amoedo (Los Troncos FC)

The 2025 Kings World Cup Clubs (formerly the Kings World Cup, renamed to distinguish from the Kings World Cup Nations) was an international seven-a-side football tournament based on the Kings League format. 32 teams took part. Spain's Porcinos FC automatically qualified as the defending world champions, having won the inaugural tournament in 2024.

In March 2025, France was announced as the tournament's host nation, coinciding with the launch of the Kings League France. The second edition took place from 1 to 14 June 2025.

On 1 May 2025, the Paris La Défense Arena was announced as the site of the finals.

== Background ==
In an introductory video for the campaign uploaded on 7 September 2024, the 2025 edition of the Kings World Cup, was announced to happen at the end of the season. Spain would send Porcinos FC, the defending champions of the competition, alongside four other teams. They were to be joined by four teams from the Americas Kings League and teams from the Kings Leagues of Italy, Brazil, France, and Germany, as well as "wildcard" teams from other countries, for a 32-team tournament. The first wildcard team was announced on 16 February 2025, Moroccan side Ultra Chmicha (led by content creator Ilyas El Maliki) after the country's semi-final performance at the 2025 Kings World Cup Nations. France would be announced as the hosts for the competition on 24 March 2025, during the Kings League France team introduction and draft.

== Slot allocation ==
The slot allocation will be as follows:

- Title holders: (Spain) Porcinos FC
- Kings League Spain: 4 teams
- Kings League Americas: 4 teams
- Kings League Italy: 4 teams
- Kings League France: 4 teams
- Kings League Germany: 3 teams (originally 4, then 2)
- Wildcards: 8 teams (originally 7, then 9)

== Format ==
The 2025 Kings World Cup Clubs retained the format of the 2024 tournament, which included features of a Swiss-system tournament.

First stage

- In the first round, the 32 teams each play one match, with the pairings decided by a random draw, with no restrictions based on nation coincidence.
- All teams advance to the second round, with the teams that won their first-round match going to a 'winner bracket' and the teams that lost going to a 'loser bracket'.
- The teams of the 'winner bracket' that win their second round match will immediately qualify for the knockout stage, while the losing teams will face the winning teams from the 'loser bracket' in a last-chance round. The winners of the last-chance round will join the 'winner bracket' second-round winners in the knockout stage.

Knockout Stage

- The knockout phase will then consist of a round of 16, quarterfinals, semifinals and a final.

== Qualified teams ==
=== Kings League Spain ===
President: (Spain) Gerard Piqué

Team	Qualification	Qualified date	Chairperson(s)	Participation
Porcinos FC	2024 Kings World Cup champions	June 9, 2024	(Spain) Ibai Llanos	2nd (Previous: 2024)
Jijantes FC	Kings League Spain Split 4 champions	December 21, 2024	(Spain) Gerard Romero	2nd (Previous: 2024)
Ultimate Móstoles	Kings League Spain 2024/25 aggregate table	April 13, 2025	(Spain) Mario Alonso (DjMaRiiO)	2nd (Previous: 2024)
Los Troncos FC	Kings League Spain 2024/25 aggregate table	April 13, 2025	(Spain) Jaume Cremades (Perxitaa)	2nd (Previous: 2024)
xBuyer Team	Kings League Spain 2024/25 aggregate table	May 14, 2025	(Spain) Javier (xBuyer) and Eric Ruiz (MiniBuyer)	2nd (Previous: 2024)

- Following the elimination of Saiyans FC in the 5th Split playoff semifinals, all remaining teams - Ultimate Móstoles, Jijantes FC and Los Troncos FC - had already qualified for the World Cup. xBuyer Team advances to the World Cup as the best team on combined points not already qualified.

=== Américas Kings League ===
President: (Mexico) Miguel Layún

Team	Qualification	Qualified date	Chairperson(s)	Participation
(Mexico) Olimpo United	Kings League Américas Split 2 champions	December 21, 2024	(Mexico) Javier Hernández (Chicharito)	2nd (Previous: 2024)
(Venezuela) Los Chamos FC	Kings League Américas 2024/25 aggregate table	May 4, 2025	(Venezuela) Donato Muñoz (TheDonato), Flavio Broianigo (YOLO) and (Dominican Republic) Steven Santos (RDjavi)	1st
(Peru) Persas FC	Kings League Américas 2024/25 aggregate table	May 4, 2025	(Peru) Andy Merino (ElZeein) and Nicola Porcella	2nd (Previous: 2024)
(Dominican Republic) Galácticos del Caribe	Kings League Américas 2024/25 aggregate table	May 13, 2025	(Dominican Republic) Angelo "Will" Valdés and Vincent Pérez (Los Futbolitos) and Santiago Matías (Alofoke)	2nd (Previous: 2024)

- Los Chamos FC won the Split 3 having already qualified. Galácticos del Caribe, their opponents in the final, were also the best team on aggregate points not already qualified, so they automatically advanced to the World Cup before the match.

=== Kings League Italy ===
President: (Sweden) Zlatan Ibrahimović
Competition Director: (Italy) Claudio Marchisio

Team	Qualification	Qualified date	Chairperson(s)	Participation
TRM FC	Kings League Italy Split 1 regular season leader	April 22, 2025	(Italy) Francesco Marzano (TheRealMarzaa)	1st
FC Zeta	Kings League Italy Split 1 playoffs semi-finalists	May 10, 2025	(Italy) Antonio Pellegrino (ZW Jackson) and Luca Toni	1st
Gear7 FC	Kings League Italy Split 1 playoffs semi-finalists	May 10, 2025	(Italy) Emanuele Nocera (Manuuxo)	1st
Boomers	Kings League Italy Split 1 playoffs semi-finalists	May 10, 2025	(Italy) Federico Lucia (Fedez)	1st

=== Kings League Brazil ===
President: (Brazil) Kaká

Team	Qualification	Qualified date	Chairperson(s)	Participation
Furia FC	Kings League Brazil Split 1 regular season leader	May 5, 2025	(Brazil) Neymar and Cris Guedes	2nd (Previous: 2024)
Desimpedidos Goti	Kings League Brazil Split 1 playoffs semi-finalists	May 9, 2025	(Brazil) Tiago Toguro and Yuri Brida (Yuri 22)	1st
Fluxo FC	Kings League Brazil Split 1 playoffs semi-finalists	May 9, 2025	(Brazil) Lucio dos Santos Lima (Cerol) and Bruno Goes dos Santos (Nobru)	1st
Dendele FC	Kings League Brazil Split 1 playoffs semi-finalists	May 9, 2025	(Brazil) Aliffe Henrique de Carvalho (Paulinho o Loko) and (Peru) Lucas Gagliasso (Luqueta)	1st

=== Kings League France ===
Team	Qualification	Qualified date	Chairperson(s)	Participation
Foot2Rue	Kings League France Split 1 regular season leader	May 5, 2025	(France) Mohamed Amine Mahmoud (AmineMaTue), Samir Nasri, and Jérémy Ménez	2nd (Previous: 2024)
Unit3d	Kings League France Split 1 regular season runner-up	May 5, 2025	(France) Lucas Adrien Hauchard (Squeezie), Sidjil Mahiddine Ben Gana (Djilsi), and Maxime Biaggi	1st
Karasu	Kings League France Split 1 playoffs semi-finalists	May 11, 2025	(France) Kamel Kebir (Kameto) and Hamza Kerdali (Hamza)	1st
PANAM All Starz	Kings League France Split 1 playoffs semi-finalists	May 11, 2025	(France) Pauleta (PFut)	1st

=== Kings League Germany ===
President: (Germany) Bastian Schweinsteiger

Team	Qualification	Qualified date	Chairperson(s)	Participation
Futbolistas Locos FC	Kings League Germany Road to Paris Main Final winner	May 4, 2025	(Turkey) Kenan Yıldız, (Germany) Jakub Dogan (Kuba) and Domenic Strobel (Chefstrobel)	1st
ERA Colonia	Kings League Germany Road to Paris Second Ticket winner	May 4, 2025	(Germany) Maik Taschenbier (Zarbex) and Felix Nier (Filow)	1st
G2 FC	Kings League Germany Road to Paris 3rd place	May 15, 2025	(Germany) Dominik Reezman (Reeze) and Wieland Welte (Rumathra)	1st

- The Kings League Germany, initially scheduled to have two teams in the World Cup, was granted a third spot after their qualifiers had already ended.

=== Wildcards ===
Team	Qualified date	Chairperson(s)	Participation
(Morocco) Ultra Chmicha	February 16, 2025	(Morocco) Ilyas El Maliki	1st (New club)
(Argentina) Kunisports	March 31, 2025	(Argentina) Sergio Agüero	2nd (Previous: 2024)
(Spain) La Capital CF	March 31, 2025	(Spain) Lamine Yamal and (Argentina) Lautaro del Campo (La Cobra)	1st (New club)
(United States) Miami 7	March 31, 2025	(United States) Jake Paul and Adin Ross	1st (New club)
(Japan) Murash FC	May 15, 2025	(Japan) Junichi Kato	2nd (Previous: 2024)
(United States) Jynxzi FC	May 15, 2025	(United States) Nicholas Stewart (Jynxzi)	1st (New club)
(Saudi Arabia) SXB FC	May 26, 2025	(Saudi Arabia) Ahmed Alqahtani (SHoNgxBoNg) and Yasser Al-Qahtani	2nd (Previous: 2024)
(Democratic Republic of the Congo) Zaytouna FC	May 26, 2025	(Democratic Republic of the Congo) Gandhi Alimasi Djuna (Gims)	1st (New club)

- (New club) ― Denotes that the World Cup is the team's first official Kings tournament.
- Kunisports is no longer listed as a Spanish club because it is set to relocate from the Kings League Spain to the Américas Kings League after the World Cup; La Capital CF will be its replacement in the Kings League.

== Schedule ==
Stage	Round	Date
First Stage	Round 1	1-3 June 2025
First Stage	Round 2	4-7 June 2025
First Stage	Last Chance Round	8-9 June 2025
Knockout stage
Knockout stage	Round of 16	10-11 June 2025
Knockout stage	Quarterfinals	12 June 2025
Knockout stage	Semifinals	13 June 2025
Knockout stage	Final	14 June 2025

== Squads ==
As usual in the Kings League, teams will field a regular roster of ten drafted players, plus guest 11th, 12th and 13th Players.

A system of international loans was set up so players from teams that had not qualified for the World Cup could play the tournament on loan in teams that had qualified.

Team squads

(Italy) Boomers

Manager: (Italy) Gabriele Canella

No.	Pos.	Nation	Player	Date of birth (age)
1	GK	(Moldova) MDA	Vlad Caprianu	5 February 2003 (aged 22)
4	MF	(Italy) ITA	Gabriele Di Battista	2 August 2002 (aged 22)
7	MF	(Italy) ITA	Alex Bonasso	11 August 2004 (aged 20)
9	FW	(Italy) ITA	Andrea Redaelli	15 December 1989 (aged 35)
10	FW	(Italy) ITA	Daniel Santoro	1 September 2003 (aged 21)
13	GK	(Italy) ITA	Mirko Dario	10 March 2003 (aged 22)
17	MF	(Italy) ITA	Bryan Mecca	5 June 1999 (aged 25)
19	MF	(Italy) ITA	Stefano Sberna	5 August 2003 (aged 21)
22	MF	(Italy) ITA	Vincenzo Amoroso	12 September 2000 (aged 24)
29	DF	(Italy) ITA	Martino Capelli	29 December 2000 (aged 24)
65	DF	(Italy) ITA	Alessandro Ferreri	1 October 2001 (aged 23)
77	FW	(Italy) ITA	Simone Lo Faso	18 February 1998 (aged 27)

(Brazil) Dendele FC

Manager: (Brazil) Wellington de Oliveira

No.	Pos.	Nation	Player	Date of birth (age)
1	GK	(Brazil) BRA	Thales	19 August 1991 (aged 33)
2	DF	(Brazil) BRA	Lyncoln Oliveira	22 January 1997 (aged 28)
5	FW	(Brazil) BRA	Coity	18 October 1995 (aged 29)
6	MF	(Brazil) BRA	Canhoto	25 April 2001 (aged 24)
8	MF	(Brazil) BRA	Assumpção	31 March 1990 (aged 35)
12	MF	(Brazil) BRA	Mathias	18 November 2001 (aged 23)
14	DF	(Brazil) BRA	Guilherme Carvalho	6 August 1991 (aged 33)
16	FW	(Brazil) BRA	Gabriel Repulho	19 October 1999 (aged 25)
18	MF	(Brazil) BRA	Romarinho	9 August 1996 (aged 28)
29	MF	(Brazil) BRA	Lucas Hector	26 February 2000 (aged 25)
30	GK	(Brazil) BRA	Maikon	8 December 1987 (aged 37)
92	MF	(Brazil) BRA	Tuco	2 October 1992 (aged 32)
97	DF	(Brazil) BRA	Fifão	3 July 1997 (aged 27)

(Brazil) Desimpedidos Goti

Manager: (Brazil) Fábio Ferreira

No.	Pos.	Nation	Player	Date of birth (age)
5	DF	(Brazil) BRA	Lucas Donadi	12 March 1998 (aged 27)
6	FW	(Brazil) BRA	Cadu José	4 April 2001 (aged 24)
7	MF	(Brazil) BRA	Jonatas	5 October 1996 (aged 28)
8	MF	(Brazil) BRA	Victor Bolt	14 September 1987 (aged 37)
10	FW	(Brazil) BRA	Marcelinho Júnior	3 August 1996 (aged 28)
11	MF	(Brazil) BRA	Luisinho Barreiros	19 December 1999 (aged 25)
17	FW	(Brazil) BRA	Gustavinho	8 December 2004 (aged 20)
18	MF	(Brazil) BRA	Fernando da Silva	7 May 1993 (aged 32)
22	GK	(Brazil) BRA	João Pedro	22 February 2001 (aged 24)
27	DF	(Brazil) BRA	Guilherme Bernardinello	21 July 1992 (aged 32)
30	MF	(Brazil) BRA	Leo Gol	14 December 1999 (aged 25)
77	FW	(Brazil) BRA	Gabriel Thor	23 June 1992 (aged 32)
95	GK	(Brazil) BRA	Vitão	3 July 1995 (aged 29)

(Germany) ERA Colonia

Manager: (Germany) Marius Duhnke

No.	Pos.	Nation	Player	Date of birth (age)
1	GK	(Germany) GER	Daniel Maus	16 August 1994 (aged 30)
6	DF	(Germany) GER	Kevin Hingerl	2 September 1993 (aged 31)
7	FW	(Germany) GER	Andrew Wooten	30 September 1989 (aged 35)
10	MF	(Germany) GER	Moritz Leitner	8 December 1992 (aged 32)
14	FW	(Germany) GER	Niklas Doll	12 December 1999 (aged 25)
17	MF	(Germany) GER	Marco Terrazzino	15 April 1991 (aged 34)
18	DF	(Germany) GER	Timo Kondziella	16 May 2003 (aged 22)
21	DF	(Germany) GER	Tobias Schröck	31 December 1992 (aged 32)
23	MF	(Germany) GER	Dominik Wüst	29 April 1996 (aged 29)
27	DF	(Germany) GER	Marcel Spitzer	13 May 1999 (aged 26)
31	MF	(Germany) GER	Riccardo Grym	13 June 1999 (aged 25)
99	GK	(Germany) GER	Cedric Golbig	26 April 2003 (aged 22)

(Italy) FC Zeta

Manager: (Italy) Cristian Brocchi

No.	Pos.	Nation	Player	Date of birth (age)
0	MF	(Italy) ITA	Axel Gulin	19 July 1995 (aged 29)
1	GK	(Italy) ITA	Alessio Buono	9 September 2002 (aged 22)
2	DF	(Italy) ITA	Nicolò Deda	18 June 2005 (aged 19)
7	FW	(Italy) ITA	Tommaso Bernardi	8 April 2001 (aged 24)
8	MF	(Italy) ITA	Andrea Montagna	10 November 2004 (aged 20)
9	FW	(Italy) ITA	Cosimo Chiricò	5 October 1991 (aged 33)
10	MF	(Italy) ITA	Matteo Perrotti	17 April 1999 (aged 26)
16	DF	(Italy) ITA	Elmahdi Kanis	12 August 1998 (aged 26)
21	MF	(Italy) ITA	Guido Nicoli	25 May 2004 (aged 21)
23	DF	(Italy) ITA	Matteo Manzoni	14 October 2003 (aged 21)
27	GK	(Italy) ITA	Samuele Venturi	7 June 2006 (aged 18)
45	FW	(Italy) ITA	Matteo Maddalena	30 July 2005 (aged 19)
96	MF	(Italy) ITA	Fabio Di Mauro	8 March 2002 (aged 23)

(Brazil) Fluxo FC

Manager: (Brazil) Paulo Neto

No.	Pos.	Nation	Player	Date of birth (age)
1	GK	(Brazil) BRA	Julio Carvalho	5 May 1992 (aged 33)
3	DF	(Brazil) BRA	Murillo	22 December 1998 (aged 26)
4	DF	(Brazil) BRA	Vini Melequinha	25 June 1999 (aged 25)
7	MF	(Brazil) BRA	Vini Alexandre	22 April 2000 (aged 25)
8	MF	(Brazil) BRA	Thiaguinho	17 February 2000 (aged 25)
9	FW	(Brazil) BRA	Caio Sanchez	27 January 1993 (aged 32)
10	MF	(Brazil) BRA	Chaveirinho	23 September 1996 (aged 28)
12	GK	(Brazil) BRA	Thiago de Oliveira	25 June 2005 (aged 19)
13	FW	(Brazil) BRA	Gustavo Menezes	13 February 2005 (aged 20)
19	FW	(Brazil) BRA	Luís Boolt	13 September 1994 (aged 30)
20	MF	(Brazil) BRA	Intera	4 March 1996 (aged 29)
77	FW	(Brazil) BRA	Victor Bueno	5 October 2000 (aged 24)
96	FW	(Brazil) BRA	Helber Jr.	15 January 1996 (aged 29)

(France) Foot2Rue

Manager: (France) Samir Nasri

No.	Pos.	Nation	Player	Date of birth (age)
0	FW	(France) FRA	Haris El Mouttaqi	19 August 2000 (aged 24)
4	DF	(Belgium) BEL	Sahir Boumhand	10 December 2004 (aged 20)
8	MF	(France) FRA	Lucas Valeri	20 February 2002 (aged 23)
9	FW	(France) FRA	William Harhouz	29 December 1999 (aged 25)
10	FW	(France) FRA	Amara Fofana	20 November 1998 (aged 26)
11	FW	(France) FRA	Andy Wothor	11 May 2005 (aged 20)
12	DF	(France) FRA	Louka Masset	19 November 1997 (aged 27)
18	DF	(France) FRA	Ousmane Badji	14 December 1994 (aged 30)
19	FW	(France) FRA	Yacine Boucharoud	30 April 2000 (aged 25)
20	MF	(France) FRA	Kevin Bru	11 December 1988 (aged 36)
23	GK	(France) FRA	Benoît Costil	3 July 1987 (aged 37)
25	MF	(Democratic Republic of the Congo) COD	Giannelli Imbula	12 September 1992 (aged 32)
99	GK	(France) FRA	Allan Rakotovazaha	3 October 1999 (aged 25)

(Brazil) Furia FC

Manager: (Brazil) Carlos Barbosa de Oliveira

No.	Pos.	Nation	Player	Date of birth (age)
1	GK	(Brazil) BRA	Matheus Ayosa	9 November 1999 (aged 25)
3	MF	(Brazil) BRA	Caio Catroca	30 August 1991 (aged 33)
5	MF	(Brazil) BRA	Andrey Batata	24 March 2002 (aged 23)
7	FW	(Brazil) BRA	Gabriel Pastuch	16 June 2004 (aged 20)
8	FW	(Brazil) BRA	Murillo Donato	24 July 1999 (aged 25)
9	FW	(Brazil) BRA	Guilherme Monagatti	10 February 1992 (aged 33)
10	FW	(Brazil) BRA	Lipão	11 December 1996 (aged 28)
11	FW	(Brazil) BRA	Leleti	21 June 1996 (aged 28)
12	MF	(Brazil) BRA	Jeffinho	27 September 1995 (aged 29)
14	MF	(Brazil) BRA	Matheus Dedo	17 November 2001 (aged 23)
22	DF	(Brazil) BRA	João Pelegrini	8 February 1998 (aged 27)
33	GK	(Brazil) BRA	Victor Hugo	16 January 1991 (aged 34)
77	FW	(Brazil) BRA	Ryan Lima	17 July 2001 (aged 23)

(Germany) Futbolistas Locos FC

Manager: (Germany) Simon Seferings

No.	Pos.	Nation	Player	Date of birth (age)
1	GK	(Germany) GER	Daniel Dreesen	4 September 1987 (aged 37)
6	DF	(Germany) GER	Salmin Rebronja	10 August 2004 (aged 20)
7	MF	(Germany) GER	Dennis Öztürk	24 April 2001 (aged 24)
10	MF	(Germany) GER	Karim Ay	1 February 2000 (aged 25)
11	MF	(Germany) GER	Maurice Castel Branco	24 February 2004 (aged 21)
15	GK	(Germany) GER	Gianluca Caruso	18 February 2001 (aged 24)
16	MF	(Turkey) TUR	Noah Can Kurmali	16 April 2002 (aged 23)
19	FW	(Croatia) CRO	Lordan Handanovic	10 November 2001 (aged 23)
21	DF	(Italy) ITA	Salvatore Giambra	7 May 2004 (aged 21)
23	DF	(Germany) GER	Timo Julian	19 July 1996 (aged 28)
31	MF	(Germany) GER	Nico Czichi	8 February 1995 (aged 30)
44	DF	(Germany) GER	Kingsley Helmut Marcinek	7 December 2001 (aged 23)

(Germany) G2 FC

Manager: (Germany) Malik Hadziavdic

No.	Pos.	Nation	Player	Date of birth (age)
7	FW	(Netherlands) NED	Berkay Sezer	1 July 2000 (aged 24)
10	MF	(Germany) GER	Tarik Hadziavdic	17 October 2000 (aged 24)
11	MF	(Netherlands) NED	Abdullah Telli	26 March 1996 (aged 29)
17	MF	(Germany) GER	Danny Blum	7 January 1991 (aged 34)
19	MF	(Germany) GER	Berkan Ronay Celebi	19 December 2001 (aged 23)
20	MF	(Germany) GER	Nejmeddin Daghfous	1 October 1986 (aged 38)
21	DF	(Germany) GER	Fabrice Montcheu	21 April 1998 (aged 27)
24	GK	(The Gambia) GAM	Amat Chaw	25 October 1998 (aged 26)
29	FW	(Germany) GER	Yunus Malli	24 February 1992 (aged 33)
30	MF	(Germany) GER	Alen Patak	14 September 1998 (aged 26)
45	GK	(Germany) GER	Lino Kasten	17 January 2001 (aged 24)
61	MF	(Turkey) TUR	Cihan Ucar	6 July 1994 (aged 30)
99	DF	(Germany) GER	Kevin Moreira	20 April 1999 (aged 26)

(Dominican Republic) Galácticos del Caribe

Manager: (Mexico) Fernando Espinosa

No.	Pos.	Nation	Player	Date of birth (age)
1	GK	(Mexico) MEX	Moisés Dabbah	25 July 1997 (aged 27)
3	DF	(Mexico) MEX	Alexis Silva	12 December 1992 (aged 32)
4	MF	(Mexico) MEX	José Islas	21 September 2000 (aged 24)
5	MF	(Brazil) BRA	Well	21 July 1997 (aged 27)
7	MF	(Mexico) MEX	Daniel Ríos	2 May 1996 (aged 29)
8	MF	(Mexico) MEX	Pabel Montes	27 August 1996 (aged 28)
10	MF	(Mexico) MEX	Diego Franco	13 September 1992 (aged 32)
17	MF	(Colombia) COL	Jairo Tapie	22 September 1991 (aged 33)
21	FW	(Mexico) MEX	Carlos Monroy	22 November 2000 (aged 24)
23	FW	(Mexico) MEX	Juan Hernández	5 January 1986 (aged 39)
30	FW	(Mexico) MEX	José Askenazi	6 June 2002 (aged 22)
81	GK	(Mexico) MEX	Luis Nava	18 November 1993 (aged 31)
88	DF	(Mexico) MEX	Enrique Lagarde	4 September 1993 (aged 31)

(Italy) Gear7 FC

Manager: (Spain) Pol Font

No.	Pos.	Nation	Player	Date of birth (age)
1	GK	(Italy) ITA	Bernardo Leka	27 May 2003 (aged 22)
4	MF	(Italy) ITA	Davide Donzelli	28 July 2005 (aged 19)
7	FW	(Italy) ITA	Leandro Cosenza	21 October 2002 (aged 22)
8	DF	(Italy) ITA	Alessandro Gelsi	7 October 1997 (aged 27)
9	FW	(Spain) ESP	Adrián de la Cruz	11 September 2003 (aged 21)
11	FW	(Italy) ITA	Gabriele Folla	3 April 2003 (aged 22)
17	FW	(Italy) ITA	Tommaso Cogi	12 August 2003 (aged 21)
21	FW	(Italy) ITA	Domenico Rossi	9 May 2000 (aged 25)
22	GK	(Italy) ITA	Gianmarco Chironi	7 September 1997 (aged 27)
24	DF	(Italy) ITA	Zakaria Choukry	21 February 2003 (aged 22)
25	GK	(Italy) ITA	Andrea Vicini	5 July 1999 (aged 25)
27	DF	(Italy) ITA	Niccolò Ciceri	28 February 1998 (aged 27)
99	DF	(Italy) ITA	Andrea Belsito	12 August 2000 (aged 24)

(Spain) Jijantes FC

Manager: (Spain) David Biosca

No.	Pos.	Nation	Player	Date of birth (age)
1	GK	(Spain) ESP	Mario León	25 May 1983 (aged 42)
4	DF	(Spain) ESP	Juan de Dios Martínez	3 January 1998 (aged 27)
5	DF	(Spain) ESP	Dani Martí	12 October 1982 (aged 42)
6	MF	(Spain) ESP	Pau Fernández	25 May 2001 (aged 24)
8	MF	(Spain) ESP	Daniel Plaza	19 September 2003 (aged 21)
9	FW	(Spain) ESP	Marc Pilar	27 July 1998 (aged 26)
10	MF	(Spain) ESP	Manuel Linares	10 February 2004 (aged 21)
11	MF	(Spain) ESP	Álex Domingo	25 May 2001 (aged 24)
14	FW	(Spain) ESP	Roger de la Villa	25 April 1996 (aged 29)
18	FW	(Spain) ESP	Pol Ortega	22 June 2003 (aged 21)
22	FW	(Spain) ESP	Carlos Martínez	3 July 1997 (aged 27)
24	GK	(Spain) ESP	Víctor Vidal	14 November 1999 (aged 25)
30	FW	(Spain) ESP	Albert López	27 July 1996 (aged 28)

(United States) Jynxzi FC

Manager: (Spain) Robert Cornfield

No.	Pos.	Nation	Player	Date of birth (age)
1	GK	(United States) USA	Merrick Cook	1 August 2004 (aged 20)
4	DF	(United States) USA	Bryan Bustamante	21 January 2001 (aged 24)
9	FW	(El Salvador) ESA	Leonardo Torres	12 May 2002 (aged 23)
10	FW	(Spain) ESP	Roc Bancells	7 April 2003 (aged 22)
11	FW	(Germany) GER	Santiago Gordillo	20 July 2002 (aged 22)
19	DF	(Spain) ESP	Yeray Cuenca	19 August 2003 (aged 21)
20	FW	(Brazil) BRA	Brinquinho	24 February 1995 (aged 30)
29	MF	(Belgium) BEL	Naufal Boumina	19 November 1993 (aged 31)
91	MF	(Spain) ESP	Víctor Blasco	1 July 1994 (aged 30)
92	FW	(Spain) ESP	Aleix Martí	19 October 2004 (aged 20)
98	GK	(Brazil) BRA	Josildo Barata	7 July 1998 (aged 26)
99	MF	(France) FRA	Idriss Oubrik	2 September 1999 (aged 25)

(France) Karasu

Manager: (France) Sabry Bezahaf

No.	Pos.	Nation	Player	Date of birth (age)
1	GK	(France) FRA	Yacine Ben Cherki	23 July 2004 (aged 20)
4	MF	(France) FRA	Yohan Mollo	18 July 1989 (aged 35)
5	DF	(France) FRA	Abdelhamid Touati	14 May 1998 (aged 27)
7	MF	(France) FRA	Alexandre Fakir	9 July 1993 (aged 31)
8	MF	(Brazil) BRA	Guilherme Carvalho Feitosa	23 November 2000 (aged 24)
10	MF	(France) FRA	Zinedine Ayadi	25 July 2004 (aged 20)
14	FW	(France) FRA	Salim Abdou Mohamed	3 August 1995 (aged 29)
15	MF	(France) FRA	Sofiane Sayah	15 March 2003 (aged 22)
19	MF	(France) FRA	Mehdi Marin	27 March 1998 (aged 27)
26	DF	(France) FRA	Mohammed Berrabah	11 September 2002 (aged 22)
28	MF	(Algeria) ALG	Foued Kadir	5 December 1983 (aged 41)
77	DF	(France) FRA	Mehdi Gacem	5 July 2005 (aged 19)
99	GK	(France) FRA	Bilal Bouchelouche	27 January 1999 (aged 26)

(Argentina) Kunisports

Manager: (Spain) Juan Manuel Miranda

No.	Pos.	Nation	Player	Date of birth (age)
1	GK	(Spain) ESP	Jorge Ibáñez	13 March 2003 (aged 22)
3	DF	(Spain) ESP	Ian González	6 January 2003 (aged 22)
4	DF	(Spain) ESP	Pol Román	5 February 1999 (aged 26)
7	MF	(Spain) ESP	Fran Rodríguez	19 November 2003 (aged 21)
8	MF	(Spain) ESP	Álvaro Arché	19 November 1996 (aged 28)
10	MF	(Spain) ESP	Javier Espinosa	19 September 1992 (aged 32)
13	MF	(Spain) ESP	Adrià Escribano	10 January 1993 (aged 32)
14	FW	(Spain) ESP	Carlos Omabegho	21 January 1995 (aged 30)
19	FW	(Spain) ESP	Guillem ZZ	2 March 1998 (aged 27)
21	MF	(Spain) ESP	Luis García	25 January 1995 (aged 30)
23	DF	(Spain) ESP	Cristian Faura	7 January 1992 (aged 33)
34	GK	(Spain) ESP	Pol Zapata	2 February 1999 (aged 26)
88	MF	(Senegal) SEN	Isaac Mendes	13 September 1998 (aged 26)
90	FW	(Spain) ESP	Mini Bartu	2 January 1999 (aged 26)

(Spain) La Capital CF

Manager: (Spain) Arnau Jariod

No.	Pos.	Nation	Player	Date of birth (age)
1	GK	(Spain) ESP	Manel Jiménez	13 February 2000 (aged 25)
3	DF	(Ecuador) ECU	Diego Almeida	12 February 2004 (aged 21)
4	DF	(Spain) ESP	Adrián Vico	13 December 2001 (aged 23)
6	MF	(Spain) ESP	Óscar Alepuz	29 April 2002 (aged 23)
7	MF	(Spain) ESP	Julen Álvarez	19 February 2001 (aged 24)
8	MF	(Spain) ESP	Daouda Bamma	29 May 2004 (aged 21)
9	FW	(Spain) ESP	Adrià Petit	10 August 2004 (aged 20)
10	FW	(Morocco) MAR	Mouad Louraoui	12 November 2006 (aged 18)
11	MF	(Spain) ESP	Ariel Guaman	2 August 2004 (aged 20)
19	FW	(Spain) ESP	Joan Benet	10 March 2005 (aged 20)
22	FW	(The Gambia) GAM	Abubacary Juwarra	22 August 2002 (aged 22)
71	GK	(Ukraine) UKR	Yaroslav Toporkov	27 February 2001 (aged 24)
77	FW	(Spain) ESP	Jordi Cano	1 April 1995 (aged 30)

(Venezuela) Los Chamos FC

Manager: (Mexico) Jos Gartland

No.	Pos.	Nation	Player	Date of birth (age)
1	GK	(Mexico) MEX	Edgar Álvarez	4 August 1998 (aged 26)
6	MF	(Mexico) MEX	Christian Lagunas	7 August 1999 (aged 25)
7	MF	(Mexico) MEX	Alejandro Díaz	29 July 1999 (aged 25)
8	MF	(Mexico) MEX	Luis Ayala	23 April 1999 (aged 26)
9	FW	(Mexico) MEX	Gerardo Martínez	14 December 1993 (aged 31)
10	MF	(Mexico) MEX	Diego Pérez	25 June 2006 (aged 18)
11	MF	(Mexico) MEX	Brian Alcaraz	10 February 1998 (aged 27)
14	DF	(Mexico) MEX	Daniel López	16 May 1995 (aged 30)
16	GK	(Mexico) MEX	Baruc Mateos	23 September 1999 (aged 25)
17	MF	(Mexico) MEX	Edwin Cárdenas	21 March 2005 (aged 20)
18	MF	(Mexico) MEX	Andrés Rugeles	19 April 1994 (aged 31)
19	DF	(Mexico) MEX	Tona Mejía	31 August 1999 (aged 25)
22	MF	(Mexico) MEX	Juan Cisneros	6 May 1998 (aged 27)
23	FW	(Mexico) MEX	David Pérez	21 July 2000 (aged 24)
34	FW	(Mexico) MEX	Genaro Castillo	25 May 1993 (aged 32)
86	FW	(Peru) PER	Toni Alvarado	17 June 1986 (aged 38)

(Spain) Los Troncos FC

Manager: (Spain) Èric Bartra

No.	Pos.	Nation	Player	Date of birth (age)
1	GK	(Spain) ESP	Pol Agustí	22 May 1997 (aged 28)
4	DF	(Spain) ESP	Álex Cubedo	29 May 1999 (aged 26)
5	DF	(Spain) ESP	David Soriano	5 January 2000 (aged 25)
7	FW	(Spain) ESP	Diego Jiménez	17 October 2001 (aged 23)
8	MF	(Spain) ESP	Lluís Alsina	31 August 2001 (aged 23)
9	FW	(Spain) ESP	Oriol Boada	8 October 1998 (aged 26)
10	MF	(Spain) ESP	Joan Verdú	5 May 1983 (aged 42)
15	DF	(Spain) ESP	Víctor Torres	17 January 2003 (aged 22)
16	DF	(Spain) ESP	Àlex Gutiérrez	11 March 1994 (aged 31)
19	MF	(Spain) ESP	Carlos Ferres	7 May 1995 (aged 30)
21	DF	(Spain) ESP	Carles Planas	4 March 1991 (aged 34)
25	GK	(Spain) ESP	Eloy Amoedo	10 March 2003 (aged 22)
30	MF	(Spain) ESP	Gerard Nolla	2 September 1998 (aged 26)

(United States) Miami 7

Manager: (Spain) Daniel Romo

No.	Pos.	Nation	Player	Date of birth (age)
0	GK	(United States) USA	Alexander Bertrand	7 August 2000 (aged 24)
1	GK	(Spain) ESP	Marc Briones	27 June 1998 (aged 26)
4	DF	(United States) USA	James Valkenburg	22 November 2004 (aged 20)
6	MF	(Brazil) BRA	Zyan Ferreira	8 October 1998 (aged 26)
7	MF	(United States) USA	Juan Ramírez	30 January 1998 (aged 27)
10	MF	(Spain) ESP	Juan Antonio Gallego	23 August 1997 (aged 27)
11	MF	(Spain) ESP	Jero Martín	5 November 1995 (aged 29)
15	FW	(United States) USA	Luiz Morales	23 October 1995 (aged 29)
17	MF	(Spain) ESP	Aitor Vives	6 August 1998 (aged 26)
21	DF	(Spain) ESP	Antonio Pelegrín	16 March 1995 (aged 30)
22	FW	(Spain) ESP	Josu Rodríguez	2 January 1990 (aged 35)
30	FW	(United States) USA	Luis Peralta	26 July 1998 (aged 26)
31	MF	(United States) USA	David Ortiz	20 September 2000 (aged 24)

(Japan) Murash FC

Manager: (Japan) Kensuke Nakai

No.	Pos.	Nation	Player	Date of birth (age)
1	GK	(Japan) JPN	Keisuke Fukaya	20 June 1998 (aged 26)
2	DF	(Japan) JPN	Joi Masuda	21 October 1992 (aged 32)
3	DF	(Japan) JPN	Shohei Moriyasu	17 August 1991 (aged 33)
4	MF	(Japan) JPN	Kasho Tamura	27 January 1992 (aged 33)
5	DF	(Japan) JPN	Shohei Agata	25 May 1994 (aged 31)
6	DF	(Japan) JPN	Ryohei Oda	3 March 2000 (aged 25)
7	MF	(Japan) JPN	Kensuke Enjo	23 August 1993 (aged 31)
9	FW	(Japan) JPN	Kazuki Hamamoto	30 May 1998 (aged 27)
11	MF	(Japan) JPN	Ryuji Sugimoto	1 June 1993 (aged 32)
12	MF	(Japan) JPN	Toshiya Miyashita	22 February 2003 (aged 22)
13	GK	(Japan) JPN	Rikiya Narita	2 October 1987 (aged 37)
14	MF	(Japan) JPN	Shunsuke Nakamura	16 May 1994 (aged 31)
15	FW	(Japan) JPN	Kan Ujihashi	22 August 1996 (aged 28)

(Mexico) Olimpo United

Manager: (Mexico) Alejandro Castro

No.	Pos.	Nation	Player	Date of birth (age)
1	GK	(Mexico) MEX	Tirso Trueba	11 June 1996 (aged 28)
2	DF	(Mexico) MEX	Josecarlos Van Rankin	14 May 1993 (aged 32)
4	DF	(Mexico) MEX	Anferny Rebollar	3 December 1995 (aged 29)
6	MF	(Mexico) MEX	Didier Uribe	28 July 2004 (aged 20)
7	MF	(Mexico) MEX	Gustavo Guillén	24 September 1993 (aged 31)
9	FW	(Mexico) MEX	Marco Bueno	31 March 1994 (aged 31)
10	MF	(Mexico) MEX	Brayan Hernández	14 September 2000 (aged 24)
15	MF	(Mexico) MEX	Manuel Viniegra	26 April 1988 (aged 37)
17	DF	(Mexico) MEX	Mario Osuna	20 August 1988 (aged 36)
18	MF	(Mexico) MEX	Uziel Román	26 March 1992 (aged 33)
19	FW	(Mexico) MEX	Jacob Morales	22 March 1999 (aged 26)
21	DF	(Mexico) MEX	Pato Arias	25 November 2003 (aged 21)

(France) PANAM All Starz

Manager: (France) Saïd Dorbani

No.	Pos.	Nation	Player	Date of birth (age)
6	DF	(Algeria) ALG	Amine Bencherif	28 January 2000 (aged 25)
7	FW	(France) FRA	Moussa Sao	17 October 1989 (aged 35)
8	MF	(France) FRA	Nicolas Martins	27 June 1997 (aged 27)
18	DF	(France) FRA	Alric Francisco	18 January 2005 (aged 20)
19	GK	(France) FRA	Guillaume Lesec	7 April 1995 (aged 30)
26	MF	(France) FRA	Nassim L'Ghoul	30 July 1997 (aged 27)
29	FW	(France) FRA	Daniel Mboudou	9 July 2005 (aged 19)
30	GK	(France) FRA	Adama Wagui	24 June 2002 (aged 22)
47	DF	(France) FRA	Nzaba Lungituka	28 June 2000 (aged 24)
69	MF	(France) FRA	Sofiane Bendaoud	24 August 1992 (aged 32)
92	FW	(France) FRA	Louis Coppin	25 June 2002 (aged 22)
95	MF	(France) FRA	Idir Ahmin	6 March 1997 (aged 28)
99	MF	(France) FRA	Eric Mathieu	19 November 1994 (aged 30)

(Peru) Persas FC

Manager: (Mexico) Gabriela Batocletti

No.	Pos.	Nation	Player	Date of birth (age)
1	GK	(Mexico) MEX	Antonio Monterde	16 December 1997 (aged 27)
3	DF	(Venezuela) VEN	Lawrence Lonsdale	4 January 2001 (aged 24)
7	FW	(Colombia) COL	Santiago Martínez	2 September 2003 (aged 21)
8	MF	(Mexico) MEX	Jesús Pérez	21 January 1997 (aged 28)
9	FW	(Mexico) MEX	Juan Celada	26 July 1994 (aged 30)
10	MF	(Brazil) BRA	Davi Ilario	29 March 2002 (aged 23)
11	MF	(Colombia) COL	Michel Cárdenas	26 January 1996 (aged 29)
13	GK	(Mexico) MEX	Bernardo Lugo	6 December 2002 (aged 22)
18	MF	(Mexico) MEX	José Miramontes	25 January 2000 (aged 25)
19	FW	(Mexico) MEX	Fernando Olmedo	26 February 2003 (aged 22)
21	MF	(Mexico) MEX	Donovan Martínez	21 February 1998 (aged 27)
22	MF	(Colombia) COL	Yair Arias	21 January 2000 (aged 25)
24	MF	(Colombia) COL	Jhon Palacios	3 July 2001 (aged 23)
99	DF	(Mexico) MEX	Kevin Valdez	24 July 1995 (aged 29)

(Spain) Porcinos FC

Manager: (Spain) Nacho Castro

No.	Pos.	Nation	Player	Date of birth (age)
3	DF	(Morocco) MAR	Nadir Louah	29 May 2003 (aged 22)
7	FW	(Spain) ESP	Nico Santos	7 February 2000 (aged 25)
8	MF	(Spain) ESP	Marc Pelaz	19 September 2003 (aged 21)
9	MF	(Spain) ESP	Gilles Vidal	26 October 2002 (aged 22)
10	MF	(Spain) ESP	Óscar Coll	19 June 2000 (aged 24)
11	MF	(Spain) ESP	Sergio Sánchez	2 December 1993 (aged 31)
12	GK	(Spain) ESP	Gerard Vacas	24 October 2004 (aged 20)
13	GK	(Spain) ESP	Capi	10 July 2004 (aged 20)
15	DF	(Switzerland) SUI	Stelios Orgianos	21 August 2001 (aged 23)
20	MF	(Spain) ESP	Adrián Lledó	3 March 1997 (aged 28)
21	FW	(Spain) ESP	Carlos Torrentbó	6 February 1991 (aged 34)
22	DF	(Spain) ESP	Adrián Frutos	25 July 1991 (aged 33)

(Saudi Arabia) SXB FC

Manager: (Saudi Arabia) Abdullah Al-Shehri

No.	Pos.	Nation	Player	Date of birth (age)
2	DF	(Colombia) COL	Camilo Saiz	3 January 1992 (aged 33)
4	DF	(Colombia) COL	Luis Moreno	30 May 1995 (aged 30)
7	FW	(Colombia) COL	Davinson Tapias	29 October 2001 (aged 23)
8	MF	(Colombia) COL	Alejandro Ortega	28 March 2000 (aged 25)
10	FW	(Colombia) COL	Angellot Caro	3 December 1988 (aged 36)
11	MF	(Colombia) COL	Brihan Gutiérrez	2 December 1997 (aged 27)
12	GK	(Colombia) COL	Camilo Mena	12 January 1999 (aged 26)
14	FW	(Saudi Arabia) KSA	Farhan Al-Asmari	20 May 1996 (aged 29)
16	FW	(Colombia) COL	Kevin Cardona	4 August 2000 (aged 24)
17	MF	(Colombia) COL	David Loaiza	3 October 1993 (aged 31)
22	GK	(Colombia) COL	Augusto León	1 January 2002 (aged 23)
47	DF	(Colombia) COL	Denilson Lobón	15 March 1999 (aged 26)
77	FW	(Mexico) MEX	Diego Martínez	22 September 1988 (aged 36)

(Italy) TRM FC

Manager: (Italy) Marco Bertoni

No.	Pos.	Nation	Player	Date of birth (age)
1	GK	(Italy) ITA	Alessandro Vagge	31 December 1996 (aged 28)
7	MF	(Italy) ITA	Alberto Muscas	12 November 1997 (aged 27)
8	MF	(Italy) ITA	Federico Turati	8 March 1995 (aged 30)
9	FW	(Italy) ITA	Francesco Caputo	6 August 1987 (aged 37)
10	MF	(Italy) ITA	Alessandro Colombo	4 July 2001 (aged 23)
11	FW	(Italy) ITA	Andres Cordova	25 November 2005 (aged 19)
13	DF	(Italy) ITA	Thomas Salvaterra	21 January 2001 (aged 24)
21	DF	(Italy) ITA	Andrea Filippi	6 August 2005 (aged 19)
23	FW	(Italy) ITA	Marouan Amiar	23 December 2001 (aged 23)
27	MF	(Italy) ITA	Simone Scanferlato	1 February 2002 (aged 23)
45	FW	(Italy) ITA	Matteo Rossoni	25 February 2002 (aged 23)
80	FW	(Italy) ITA	Denis Andrei	24 August 2004 (aged 20)
98	GK	(Italy) ITA	Vittorio Grimaldi	30 March 1998 (aged 27)

(Spain) Ultimate Móstoles

Manager: (Spain) Álex Martínez

No.	Pos.	Nation	Player	Date of birth (age)
1	GK	(Spain) ESP	Joan Canet	4 January 2003 (aged 22)
8	FW	(Spain) ESP	Coro	5 January 1983 (aged 42)
9	FW	(Spain) ESP	Kilian Honorato	22 April 1999 (aged 26)
10	MF	(Spain) ESP	Dani Liñares	16 May 1998 (aged 27)
11	DF	(Spain) ESP	Aleix Hernando	15 October 2003 (aged 21)
13	GK	(Spain) ESP	José Segovia	13 April 1991 (aged 34)
18	MF	(Spain) ESP	Xavi Fabra	27 August 1996 (aged 28)
21	DF	(Spain) ESP	Diego de la Mata	3 March 1993 (aged 32)
22	DF	(Spain) ESP	Mario Reyes	26 May 1991 (aged 34)
24	MF	(Spain) ESP	Alberto de la Bella	2 December 1985 (aged 39)
66	DF	(Spain) ESP	Héctor Blanco	20 August 2001 (aged 23)
77	FW	(Spain) ESP	Sergi Gestí	14 February 1994 (aged 31)

(Morocco) Ultra Chmicha

Manager: (Morocco) Majid El Khal

No.	Pos.	Nation	Player	Date of birth (age)
2	MF	(Morocco) MAR	Achraf Saoud	21 June 1990 (aged 34)
8	MF	(Morocco) MAR	Reda Zahraoui	7 October 1991 (aged 33)
10	MF	(Morocco) MAR	Mbark Boussoufa	15 August 1984 (aged 40)
11	FW	(Morocco) MAR	Said Elaouny	1 June 1993 (aged 32)
12	MF	(Morocco) MAR	Mohamed Boullouh	11 April 2005 (aged 20)
14	MF	(Morocco) MAR	Idriss Raiss	9 May 1996 (aged 29)
16	DF	(Morocco) MAR	Yassir Jarici	25 April 1989 (aged 36)
17	FW	(Morocco) MAR	Nabil Dirar	25 February 1986 (aged 39)
21	MF	(Morocco) MAR	Soufian Chaaraoui	15 November 1996 (aged 28)
40	GK	(France) FRA	Boubacar Bah	9 July 1997 (aged 27)
59	MF	(Morocco) MAR	Hatim Finani	15 December 1993 (aged 31)
93	GK	(Morocco) MAR	Marouane Mzirira	24 April 1993 (aged 32)
99	DF	(Morocco) MAR	Issam Erraki	5 January 1981 (aged 44)

(France) Unit3d

Manager: (Monaco) Campi Grégory

No.	Pos.	Nation	Player	Date of birth (age)
6	MF	(France) FRA	Alex Diliberto	29 October 2000 (aged 24)
7	DF	(France) FRA	Youssef Khatiri	3 February 1998 (aged 27)
8	MF	(France) FRA	Théo Chendri	26 May 1997 (aged 28)
9	FW	(France) FRA	Louis Lapouge	11 November 1993 (aged 31)
10	MF	(France) FRA	Clément Goguey	25 November 1997 (aged 27)
17	DF	(France) FRA	Anthony Scaramozzino	30 April 1985 (aged 40)
20	GK	(Chad) CHA	Emmanuel Mifsud	12 February 1998 (aged 27)
23	FW	(France) FRA	Marvin Emmanuel	19 June 1996 (aged 28)
26	FW	(France) FRA	Abdraman Touré	26 July 2001 (aged 23)
28	MF	(France) FRA	Malick Assef	12 June 1994 (aged 30)
77	GK	(France) FRA	Florian Forestier	23 January 1995 (aged 30)
78	DF	(France) FRA	Alseny Sano	21 June 2003 (aged 21)
93	FW	(Comoros) COM	Abdourahim Moina	17 December 2000 (aged 24)

(Spain) xBuyer Team

Manager: (Spain) Víctor González

No.	Pos.	Nation	Player	Date of birth (age)
1	GK	(Spain) ESP	Sergi Aguilar	8 July 1995 (aged 29)
4	DF	(Spain) ESP	Daniel Santiago	22 August 2001 (aged 23)
5	DF	(Spain) ESP	David Pérez	18 July 1995 (aged 29)
6	MF	(Spain) ESP	Adri Gimeno	25 March 1995 (aged 30)
7	FW	(Spain) ESP	Lepetit	24 October 2001 (aged 23)
8	FW	(Spain) ESP	Víctor Oribe	2 September 1989 (aged 35)
9	FW	(Spain) ESP	Iker Alcarazo	16 July 2002 (aged 22)
10	MF	(Spain) ESP	Pablo Beguer	30 January 1995 (aged 30)
13	GK	(Spain) ESP	Manuel Martín	4 April 1995 (aged 30)
14	FW	(Spain) ESP	Jacobo Liencres	11 June 1996 (aged 28)
18	MF	(Japan) JPN	Ao Kishimoto	30 May 1995 (aged 30)
22	FW	(Spain) ESP	Juanma González	4 October 1992 (aged 32)
23	FW	(Spain) ESP	Eric Simó	5 September 1999 (aged 25)
80	MF	(Morocco) MAR	Fuad El Amrani	30 November 2001 (aged 23)

(Democratic Republic of the Congo) Zaytouna FC

Manager: (Morocco) Mustapha Ahouaqui

No.	Pos.	Nation	Player	Date of birth (age)
5	DF	(Spain) ESP	Daniel Pérez	11 March 1997 (aged 28)
6	MF	(Morocco) MAR	Abdellatif Elbajjani	4 April 1994 (aged 31)
10	MF	(Morocco) MAR	Oussama Benlaadem	24 September 1999 (aged 25)
11	MF	(France) FRA	Adrien Regattin	22 August 1991 (aged 33)
12	GK	(Morocco) MAR	Lahcen Damhari	12 September 2000 (aged 24)
13	MF	(Morocco) MAR	Rabiae Bounnit	12 March 2003 (aged 22)
14	DF	(Morocco) MAR	Amalah Zakaria	29 December 1998 (aged 26)
16	MF	(Morocco) MAR	Ayoub Bahrouji	8 June 1997 (aged 27)
18	FW	(Morocco) MAR	Zoutini Salah	2 January 1997 (aged 28)
20	MF	(Morocco) MAR	Houssam El Gazzoui	20 June 1997 (aged 27)
22	MF	(Morocco) MAR	Youssef Taoufik	9 August 1994 (aged 30)
99	GK	(France) FRA	Jean-Marc Koffi	10 January 1999 (aged 26)

== Broadcast ==
The entire tournament will be livestreamed on Twitch, YouTube and Kick, both from the official Kings League channels and individual feeds from the teams' chairpersons.

On 29 May 2025, it was also announced that DAZN would be broadcasting the entire tournament for free in Spain.

== First stage ==
=== First round ===
The first-round pairings were drawn on 26 May 2025.

Team 1	Score	Team 2
Desimpedidos Goti (Brazil)	5–3	(Democratic Republic of the Congo) Zaytouna FC
Persas FC (Peru)	2 (4)–(3) 2	(Spain) La Capital CF
G2 FC (Germany)	1–3	(Spain) Ultimate Móstoles
Porcinos FC (Spain)	5–4	(United States) Miami 7
Boomers (Italy)	4–9	(France) Unit3d
Galácticos del Caribe (Dominican Republic)	5–4	(Germany) ERA Colonia
Gear7 FC (Italy)	4 (1)–(2) 4	(France) Karasu
FC Zeta (Italy)	5–2	(Mexico) Olimpo United
SXB FC (Saudi Arabia)	4–5	(Spain) Jijantes FC
Furia FC (Brazil)	8–4	(Argentina) Kunisports
Los Troncos FC (Spain)	3–2	(Italy) TRM FC
xBuyer Team (Spain)	10–1	(Venezuela) Los Chamos FC
Fluxo FC (Brazil)	6–3	(Germany) Futbolistas Locos FC
Ultra Chmicha (Morocco)	4–5	(France) PANAM All Starz
Dendele FC (Brazil)	5–4	(United States) Jynxzi FC
Foot2Rue (France)	5–3	(Japan) Murash FC

1 June 2025
15:00
Round 1 Match P

Foot2Rue (France)	5–3	(Japan) Murash FC
Costil 1'; Boucharoud 14'; Fofana 23', 37'; El Mouttaqi 35'	Report	Fukaya 1'; Enjo 2'; Nakamura 38' (pen.)

Cupra Arena at Parc des Expositions de Villepinte, Paris

1 June 2025
16:00
Round 1 Match A

Desimpedidos Goti (Brazil)	5–3	(Democratic Republic of the Congo) Zaytouna FC
Leo Gol 7', 20+1', 32' (pen.); Jonatas 20'; Victor Bolt 31'	Report	Koffi 1'; Salah 28'; Bounit (yellow card) 28'; Gims 29' (pp)

Cupra Arena at Parc des Expositions de Villepinte, Paris

1 June 2025
17:00
Round 1 Match H

FC Zeta (Italy)	5–2	(Mexico) Olimpo United
Manzoni 5'; Perrotti 18', 38' (pen.); Chiricò 20', 26'	Report	Bueno 22'; Hernández 37'

Cupra Arena at Parc des Expositions de Villepinte, Paris

1 June 2025
18:00
Round 1 Match N

Ultra Chmicha (Morocco)	4–5	(France) PANAM All Starz
Erraki 2'; Boullouh 15' (yellow card) 20'; Bah (yellow card) 19'; Nabil (yellow card) 20+1'; Raiss 20+1'; El Maliki 34' (pp)	Report	Lesec 1'; Bendaoud 1'; L'Ghoul 34'; SAO 34' (pen.); Bencherif (yellow card) 35'; Martins 36'

Cupra Arena at Parc des Expositions de Villepinte, Paris

1 June 2025
19:00
Round 1 Match F

Galácticos del Caribe (Dominican Republic)	5–4	(Germany) ERA Colonia
Askenazi 20'; Well 20+1', 37'; Silva 40' (x2)	Report	Maus 1'; Doll 17'; Filow 18' (pp); Leitner 20+2' (yellow card) 40+1'

Cupra Arena at Parc des Expositions de Villepinte, Paris

1 June 2025
20:00
Round 1 Match C

G2 FC (Germany)	1–3	(Spain) Ultimate Móstoles
Telli 19'	Report	de la Bella 1' de la Mata 2'; Coro 5'

Cupra Arena at Parc des Expositions de Villepinte, Paris

1 June 2025
21:00
Round 1 Match J

Furia FC (Brazil)	8–4	(Argentina) Kunisports
Lima 13'; Lipão 19', 32'; Leleti 20+1', 40+1' (x2); Donato 26'; Dedo 27'	Report	Espinosa 2', 9'; García 20', 20+1'

Cupra Arena at Parc des Expositions de Villepinte, Paris

1 June 2025
22:00
Round 1 Match D

Porcinos FC (Spain)	5–4	(United States) Miami 7
Santos 19'; Vidal 20', 29' (pen.); Louah 20+1' (yellow card) 25'; Pelaz 24'	Report	Vives 1', 20+1' (red card) 22'; Gallego 11'; Santos 34' (o.g.)

Cupra Arena at Parc des Expositions de Villepinte, Paris

2 June 2025
19:00
Round 1 Match M

Fluxo FC (Brazil)	6–3	(Germany) Futbolistas Locos FC
Boolt 1', 19'; Thiaguinho 15'; Alexandre 24'; Nobru 26' (pp); Helber Jr. 26'	Report	Rebronja 11', 38'; Özturk 20'

Cupra Arena at Parc des Expositions de Villepinte, Paris

2 June 2025
20:00
Round 1 Match E

Boomers (Italy)	4–9	(France) Unit3d
Lo Faso 2', 23' (pen.); Ferreri 7'; Santoro 20+1'	Report	Goguey 4' (yellow card) 37'; Emmanuel 9', 20'; Touré 19', 24'; Alidi 20+1', 22'; Djilsi 23' (pp); Diliberto 32'

Cupra Arena at Parc des Expositions de Villepinte, Paris

2 June 2025
21:00
Round 1 Match I

SXB FC (Saudi Arabia)	4–5	(Spain) Jijantes FC
Martínez 20'; Loaiza 20+1'; SHoNgxBoNg 22' (pp); Moreno 38'	Report	Ortega 2', 39' (x2); Martí (yellow card) 6'; Vidal 40+2' (x2)

Cupra Arena at Parc des Expositions de Villepinte, Paris

2 June 2025
22:00
Round 1 Match B

Persas FC (Peru)	2–2	(Spain) La Capital CF
Ilario 1', 19'; Pérez (red card) 21'	Report	Juwara 20'; La Cobra 34' (pp); Alepuz (yellow card) 40+1'
Penalties
Lonsdale (penalty scored); Martínez (penalty missed); Palacios (penalty missed); Arias (penalty missed); Ilario (penalty scored); Monterde (penalty missed); Valdez (penalty missed); Ilario (penalty scored); Lonsdale (penalty scored)	4–3	(penalty scored) Petit; (penalty missed) Louraoui; (penalty missed) Benet; (penalty scored) Bamma; (penalty missed) Juwara; (penalty missed) Jiménez; (penalty missed) Cano; (penalty scored) Almeida; (penalty missed) Petit

Cupra Arena at Parc des Expositions de Villepinte, Paris

3 June 2025
19:00
Round 1 Match K

Los Troncos FC (Spain)	3–2	(Italy) TRM FC
Amoedo 1'; Nolla 3'; Jiménez 24'	Report	Vagge 1'; Caputo 34'

Cupra Arena at Parc des Expositions de Villepinte, Paris

3 June 2025
20:00
Round 1 Match G

Gear7 FC (Italy)	4–4	(France) Karasu
Chironi 1'; Rossi 3', 38' (pen.), 38' (pen.)	Report	Bouchelouche 1' (yellow card) 40+3'; Feitosa 8' (pen.), 20'; Hamza 22' (pp)
Penalties
Rossi (penalty missed); Gelsi (penalty missed); Donzelli (penalty scored) de la Cruz (penalty missed); Ciceri (penalty missed)	1–2	(penalty missed) Feitosa; (penalty missed) Kadir; (penalty missed) Berrabah; (penalty scored) Fakir; (penalty scored) Mollo

Cupra Arena at Parc des Expositions de Villepinte, Paris

3 June 2025
21:00
Round 1 Match L

xBuyer Team (Spain)	10–1	(Venezuela) Los Chamos FC
El Amrani 2'; Oribe 14'; MiniBuyer 26' (pp); Beguer 34'; Gimeno 39' (x2); Kishimoto 40' (x2); Alcarazo 40+2' (x2)	Report	Yolo 17' (pp)

Cupra Arena at Parc des Expositions de Villepinte, Paris

3 June 2025
22:00
Round 1 Match O

Dendele FC (Brazil)	5–4	(United States) Jynxzi FC
Canhoto 2'; Oliveira 20'; Romarinho 24'; Repulho 32' (x2)	Report	Brinquinho 21' (pen.); Bancells 27' (pen.), 36'; Boumina 30'

Cupra Arena at Parc des Expositions de Villepinte, Paris

=== Second round ===
==== Winners' bracket ====
Team 1	Score	Team 2
Desimpedidos Goti (Brazil)	1–4	(Peru) Persas FC
Ultimate Móstoles (Spain)	3–7	(Spain) Porcinos FC
Unit3d (France)	6–3	(Dominican Republic) Galácticos del Caribe
Karasu (France)	3–5	(Italy) FC Zeta
Jijantes FC (Spain)	3–7	(Brazil) Furia FC
Los Troncos FC (Spain)	4–1	(Spain) xBuyer Team
Fluxo FC (Brazil)	4–5	(France) PANAM All Starz
Dendele FC (Brazil)	6–5	(France) Foot2Rue

==== Losers' bracket ====
Team 1	Score	Team 2
Zaytouna FC (Democratic Republic of the Congo)	5–6	(Spain) La Capital CF
G2 FC (Germany)	2–9	(United States) Miami 7
Boomers (Italy)	6–5	(Germany) ERA Colonia
Gear7 FC (Italy)	4–2	(Mexico) Olimpo United
SXB FC (Saudi Arabia)	8–3	(Argentina) Kunisports
TRM FC (Italy)	3–5	(Venezuela) Los Chamos FC
Futbolistas Locos FC (Germany)	5 (2)–(1) 5	(Morocco) Ultra Chmicha
Jynxzi FC (United States)	5 (3)–(2) 5	(Japan) Murash FC

4 June 2025
19:00
Round 2 Match 9

Zaytouna FC (Democratic Republic of the Congo)	5–6	(Spain) La Capital CF
Salah 26' (x2); Bahrouji 35'; Elbajjani (yellow card) 37'; Benlaadem 40+4' (x2)	Report	Jiménez 1' (yellow card) 40+3'; Cano 4'; Benet 13'; Louraoui 17'; La Cobra 18' (pp); Alepuz 20+2' (yellow card) 37'

Cupra Arena at Parc des Expositions de Villepinte, Paris

4 June 2025
20:00
Round 2 Match 10

G2 FC (Germany)	2–9	(United States) Miami 7
Blum 14'; Malli 35' (pen.); Hadziavdic (yellow card) 40+1'	Report	Briones 1'; Gallego 19', 32' (x2); Ortiz 28'; Rodríguez

Cupra Arena at Parc des Expositions de Villepinte, Paris

4 June 2025
21:00
Round 2 Match 2

Ultimate Móstoles (Spain)	3–7	(Spain) Porcinos FC
Hernando 4' de la Mata 19'; DjMaRiiO 38' (pp)	Report	Lledó 3'; Pelaz 20' (pen.); Coll 27'; Orgianos 31'; Frutos 38'; Santos 40+1' (x2)

Cupra Arena at Parc des Expositions de Villepinte, Paris

4 June 2025
22:00
Round 2 Match 1

Desimpedidos Goti (Brazil)	1–4	(Peru) Persas FC
Leo Gol 30'	Report	Palacios 3', 18', 27'; Ilario 20+1' (pen.)

Cupra Arena at Parc des Expositions de Villepinte, Paris

5 June 2025
19:00
Round 2 Match 11

Boomers (Italy)	6–5	(Germany) ERA Colonia
Dario 1'; Mecca 17'; Santoro 17'; Lo Faso 19', 37' (pen.); Capelli 24'; Redaelli (red card) 32'	Report	Maus 19', 20+1'; Terrazzino 29', 35', 38' (pen.)

Cupra Arena at Parc des Expositions de Villepinte, Paris

5 June 2025
20:00
Round 2 Match 15

Futbolistas Locos FC (Germany)	5–5	(Morocco) Ultra Chmicha
Can Kurmali 1'; Rebronja 27'; Jarici 28' (o.g.); Handanovic 28'; Kuba 34' (pp)	Report	Mzirira 2'; Rebronja 15' (o.g.); Chaaraoui 20' (pen.); Erraki 20+1'; El Maliki 34' (pp)
Penalties
Rebronja (penalty missed); Giambra (penalty missed); Öztürk (penalty missed); Can Kurmali (penalty scored); Handanovic (penalty scored)	2–1	(penalty missed) Boussoufa; (penalty scored) Chaaraoui; (penalty missed) Erraki; (penalty missed) El Fenni; (penalty missed) Boullouh

Cupra Arena at Parc des Expositions de Villepinte, Paris

5 June 2025
21:00
Round 2 Match 3

Unit3d (France)	6–3	(Dominican Republic) Galácticos del Caribe
Forestier 1'; Khatiri 13' (yellow card) 15'; Scaramozzino (yellow card) 15'; Emmanuel (yellow card) 17' (goal) 19', 20+2'; Moina 20+1'; Sano 32'	Report	Well 20', 20+1', 20+1'; Silva (red card) 38'

Cupra Arena at Parc des Expositions de Villepinte, Paris

5 June 2025
22:00
Round 2 Match 7

Fluxo FC (Brazil)	4–5 (g.g.)	(France) PANAM All Starz
Vini Alexandre 2', 20+1'; Chaveirinho 24'; Bueno 32'	Report	Bendaoud 19'; Pfut 23' (pp); Mathieu 26'; Martins 38' (pen.) 40'

Cupra Arena at Parc des Expositions de Villepinte, Paris

6 June 2025
19:00
Round 2 Match 12

Gear7 FC (Italy)	4–2	(Mexico) Olimpo United
Chironi 1', 1', 2'; Rossi 5' (yellow card) 19'	Report	Morales 14', 20+1'

Cupra Arena at Parc des Expositions de Villepinte, Paris

6 June 2025
20:00
Round 2 Match 4

Karasu (France)	3–5	(Italy) FC Zeta
Feitosa 1', 20+1'; Kameto 29' (pp)	Report	Manzoni (yellow card) 20'; Perrotti 20+1', 33' (pen.); Di Mauro 29'; ZW Jackson 29' (pp); Bernardi 32'

Cupra Arena at Parc des Expositions de Villepinte, Paris

6 June 2025
21:00
Round 2 Match 6

Los Troncos FC (Spain)	4–1	(Spain) xBuyer Team
Planas 1'; Nolla 2'; Jiménez 20'; Perxitaa 32' (pp)	Report	Beguer 19'

Cupra Arena at Parc des Expositions de Villepinte, Paris

6 June 2025
22:00
Round 2 Match 8

Dendele FC (Brazil)	6–5	(France) Foot2Rue
Oliveira 2'; Hector 3', 26'; Tuco 14'; Carvalho 20+1' (yellow card) 37'; Luqueta 21' (pp); Romarinho (yellow card) 26'	Report	Fofana 8' (yellow card) 31'; Harhouz 20', 23'; El Mouttaqi

Cupra Arena at Parc des Expositions de Villepinte, Paris

7 June 2025
19:00
Round 2 Match 16

Jynxzi FC (United States)	5–5	(Japan) Murash FC
Brinquinho 2', 20', 20+1', 28' (x2)	Report	Oda 1'; Miyashita 9'; Kato 27' (pp); Moriyasu (yellow card) 33'; Bustamante
Penalties
Martí (penalty scored); Gordillo (penalty missed); Brinquinho (penalty missed); Boumina (penalty scored); Torres (penalty scored)	3–2	(penalty missed) Agata; (penalty missed) Tamura; (penalty scored) Hamamoto; (penalty missed) Enjo; (penalty scored) Nakamura

Cupra Arena at Parc des Expositions de Villepinte, Paris

7 June 2025
20:00
Round 2 Match 14

TRM FC (Italy)	3–5	(Venezuela) Los Chamos FC
Caputo 13'; Scanferlato 21'; Colombo 23' (pen.); Muscas (yellow card) 38'	Report	Mejía 1', 3'; Cisneros 20+1', 37' (pen.); Cárdenas 36'; López (yellow card) 38'

Cupra Arena at Parc des Expositions de Villepinte, Paris

7 June 2025
21:00
Round 2 Match 13

SXB FC (Saudi Arabia)	8–3	(Argentina) Kunisports
Mena 1'; Caro 2', 20+1', 23', 40+3' (x2); Cardona 9'; Saiz 22'	Report	Mendes 18'; Espinosa 19'; Mini Bartu 28'; Escribano (yellow card) 40+1'

Cupra Arena at Parc des Expositions de Villepinte, Paris

7 June 2025
22:00
Round 2 Match 5

Jijantes FC (Spain)	3–7	(Brazil) Furia FC
Martínez (yellow card) 19'; Ortega 20', 20+2'; López 26'	Report	Leleti 1', 40+1' (x2); Lipão (yellow card) 4' (goal) 19' (pen.), 20+2'; Dedo 13'; Donato 21'

Cupra Arena at Parc des Expositions de Villepinte, Paris

=== Last-chance round ===
Team 1	Score	Team 2
Desimpedidos Goti (Brazil)	9–1	(United States) Jynxzi FC
Ultimate Móstoles (Spain)	4 (1)–(2) 4	(Germany) Futbolistas Locos FC
Galácticos del Caribe (Dominican Republic)	3–5	(Venezuela) Los Chamos FC
Karasu (France)	7-3	(Saudi Arabia) SXB FC
Jijantes FC (Spain)	4–5	(Italy) Gear7 FC
xBuyer Team (Spain)	10–6	(Italy) Boomers
Fluxo FC (Brazil)	6–4	(United States) Miami 7
Foot2Rue (France)	4–3	(Spain) La Capital CF

8 June 2025
19:00
Last Chance 6

xBuyer Team (Spain)	10–6	(Italy) Boomers
Martín 1'; Liencres 9'; Oribe 12'; El Amrani 19', 20+1', 40+3' (x2); Beguer 20+2'; Gimeno 24', 35'	Report	Lo Faso 1', 3', 21' (pen.), 32'; Sberna 40+1' (x2)

Cupra Arena at Parc des Expositions de Villepinte, Paris

8 June 2025
20:00
Last Chance 2

Ultimate Móstoles (Spain)	4–4	(Germany) Futbolistas Locos FC
Coro 18'; Liñares 20'; DjMaRiiO 33' (pp); Hernando 34'	Report	Rebronja 6', 36' (pen.); Czichi 30'; Chefstrobel 30' (pp); Marcinek (yellow card) 36'
Penalties
Liñares (penalty missed); Gestí (penalty missed); Coro (penalty scored) de la Mata (penalty missed) de la Bella (penalty missed); Segovia (penalty missed)	1–2	(penalty missed) Czichi; (penalty missed) Giambra; (penalty missed) Rebronja; (penalty scored) Can Kurmali; (penalty missed) Handanovic; (penalty scored) Dreesen

Cupra Arena at Parc des Expositions de Villepinte, Paris

8 June 2025
21:00
Last Chance 3

Galácticos del Caribe (Dominican Republic)	3–5	(Venezuela) Los Chamos FC
Askenazi 4', 20+1'; Well 20'; Monroy (yellow card) 25'	Report	Alvarado 9'; Castillo 10', 20+1', 34'; Cisneros 36' (pen.)

Cupra Arena at Parc des Expositions de Villepinte, Paris

8 June 2025
22:00
Last Chance 7

Fluxo FC (Brazil)	6–4	(United States) Miami 7
Luís Boolt 1', 32'; Vini Alexandre 10', 20+1'; Helber Jr. 20', 20+2'	Report	Gallego 2', 20+1'; Bertrand 20'; Vives (yellow card) 20'; Rodríguez 21' (pen.)

Cupra Arena at Parc des Expositions de Villepinte, Paris

9 June 2025
19:00
Last Chance 5

Jijantes FC (Spain)	4–5	(Italy) Gear7 FC
Ortega 1', 2'; Martínez 26'; López 38' (pen.)	Report	Chironi 1' (yellow card) 37'; Folla 20', 40+1' (x2); Manuuxo 38' (pp)

Cupra Arena at Parc des Expositions de Villepinte, Paris

9 June 2025
20:00
Last Chance 8

Foot2Rue (France)	4–3 (g.g.)	(Spain) La Capital CF
Costil 1'; El Mouttaqi 20' (yellow card) 25' 40+1' (pen.); Bru 31' (yellow card) 35'	Report	Almeida 14'; La Cobra 27' (pp); Benet 33'

Cupra Arena at Parc des Expositions de Villepinte, Paris

9 June 2025
21:00
Last Chance 4

Karasu (France)	7–3	(Saudi Arabia) SXB FC
Feitosa 1'; Mollo 3', 20' (yellow card) 38'; Fakir 17'; Marin 20+1'; Kadir 40+3' (x2)	Report	Caro 2'; Lobón (yellow card) 18'; SHoNgxBoNg 21' (pp); Cardona 23' (yellow card) 32'

Cupra Arena at Parc des Expositions de Villepinte, Paris

9 June 2025
22:00
Last Chance 1

Desimpedidos Goti (Brazil)	9–1	(United States) Jynxzi FC
Luisinho Alves 1'; Marcelinho Júnior 10' (pen.), 28'; Leo Gol 11', 20'; Toguro 12' (pp); Gabriel Thor 29' (pen.); Gustavinho 39' (x2)	Report	Boumina 21' (pen.) (yellow card) 25'; Torres (yellow card) 38'

Cupra Arena at Parc des Expositions de Villepinte, Paris

== Knockout stage ==
Qualified teams

Team	Qualified via
(Peru) Persas FC	Winners' bracket
(Spain) Porcinos FC	Winners' bracket
(France) Unit3d	Winners' bracket
(Italy) FC Zeta	Winners' bracket
(Brazil) Furia FC	Winners' bracket
(Spain) Los Troncos FC	Winners' bracket
(France) PANAM All Starz	Winners' bracket
(Brazil) Dendele FC	Winners' bracket
(Brazil) Desimpedidos Goti	Last-chance round
(Germany) Futbolistas Locos FC	Last-chance round
(Venezuela) Los Chamos FC	Last-chance round
(France) Karasu	Last-chance round
(Italy) Gear7 FC	Last-chance round
(Spain) xBuyer Team	Last-chance round
(Brazil) Fluxo FC	Last-chance round
(France) Foot2Rue	Last-chance round

Round of 16 pairings were drawn on 8 June, before the start of the last-chance round.

Bracket

Round of 16 (10-11 June)
(Spain) Los Troncos FC	4
(Venezuela) Los Chamos FC	2
(Italy) FC Zeta	6
(Italy) Gear7 FC	7
(Peru) Persas FC	3
(Brazil) Fluxo FC	5
(France) PANAM All Starz	7
(France) Foot2Rue	3
(Brazil) Dendele FC	7
(Brazil) Desimpedidos Goti	6
(Spain) Porcinos FC	8
(Spain) xBuyer Team	7
(Brazil) Furia FC	9
(France) Karasu	6
(France) Unit3d	7
(Germany) Futbolistas Locos FC	2

Quarter-finals (12 June)
(Spain) Los Troncos FC	5
(Italy) Gear7 FC	4
(Brazil) Fluxo FC	5
(France) PANAM All Starz	4
(Brazil) Dendele FC	5
(Spain) Porcinos FC	6
(Brazil) Furia FC	8
(France) Unit3d	1

Semi-finals (13 June)
(Spain) Los Troncos FC	6
(Brazil) Fluxo FC	5
(Spain) Porcinos FC	5
(Brazil) Furia FC	4

Final (14 June)
(Spain) Los Troncos FC	6
(Spain) Porcinos FC	3

=== Round of 16 ===
10 June 2025
19:00
Round of 16

FC Zeta (Italy)	6–7	(Italy) Gear7 FC
Perrotti 13' (pen.), 19' (red card) 20+1'; Chiricò 13', 20'; Manzoni 27' (x2)	Report	Rossi 1', 19', 20+1', 20+1' (pen.); Gelsi 3' (pen.); Cosenza 8', 29'

Cupra Arena at Parc des Expositions de Villepinte, Paris

10 June 2025
20:00
Round of 16

Los Troncos FC (Spain)	4–2	(Venezuela) Los Chamos FC
Nolla 19', 20', 33' (x2)	Report	Lagunas 20+1'; Yolo 38' (pp); Cisneros (yellow card) 40+1'; López (yellow card) 40+2'

Cupra Arena at Parc des Expositions de Villepinte, Paris

10 June 2025
21:00
Round of 16

Persas FC (Peru)	3–5	(Brazil) Fluxo FC
Palacios 3', 20', 28'	Report	Luís Boolt 10', 20+1'; Helber Jr. 20', 37'; Chaveirinho 29' (yellow card) 40'

Cupra Arena at Parc des Expositions de Villepinte, Paris

10 June 2025
22:00
Round of 16

PANAM All Starz (France)	7–3	(France) Foot2Rue
Lesec 1'; Bendaoud 2'; Martins 16'; Sao 20+1'; Pfut 21' (pp); L'Ghoul 24', 33'; Wagui (yellow card) 25'	Report	Harhouz 1'; El Mouttaqi 25' (pen.), 38' (pen.); Badji (yellow card) 33'

Cupra Arena at Parc des Expositions de Villepinte, Paris

11 June 2025
19:00
Round of 16

Unit3d (France)	7–2	(Germany) Futbolistas Locos FC
Forestier 1'; Touré 4'; Emmanuel 19', 30' (x2); Squeezie 37' (pp); Goguey 37'	Report	Rebronja 22' (yellow card) 31'; Chefstrobel 37' (pp)

Cupra Arena at Parc des Expositions de Villepinte, Paris

11 June 2025
20:00
Round of 16

Porcinos FC (Spain)	8–7	(Spain) xBuyer Team
Vidal 18', 19', 20+1', 34' (pen.), 40' (x2); Santos 36', 37'	Report	Beguer 2'; Oribe 15', 20', 34' (x2); El Amrani 19'; Liencres 21'

Cupra Arena at Parc des Expositions de Villepinte, Paris

11 June 2025
21:00
Round of 16

Dendele FC (Brazil)	7–6	(Brazil) Desimpedidos Goti
Canhoto 2', 19', 37' (pen.); Tuco 20+1'; Luqueta 36' (pp); Repulho 40+1' (x2)	Report	Luisinho 1'; Leo Gol 20'; Marcelinho 26', 36', 40+4' (x2); Victor Bolt (yellow card) 29'

Cupra Arena at Parc des Expositions de Villepinte, Paris

11 June 2025
22:00
Round of 16

Furia FC (Brazil)	9–6	(France) Karasu
Victor Hugo 1'; Dedo 4'; Leleti 7', 39' (x2); Lipão 17', 21' (pen.), 22'; Pelegrini 37'	Report	Feitosa 1'; Bouchelouche 2'; Abdou 14'; Mollo 20' (yellow card) 27'; Hamza 23' (pp); Gacem 30'

Cupra Arena at Parc des Expositions de Villepinte, Paris

=== Quarter-finals ===
12 June 2025
19:00
Quarter Finals

Los Troncos FC (Spain)	5–4 (g.g.)	(Italy) Gear7 FC
Amoedo 2'; Jiménez 6'; Verdú 18'; Planas (yellow card) 19'; Cubedo (yellow card) 37'; Perxitaa 38' (pp); Boada 40+1'	Report	Chironi 1'; Rossi 1'; Gelsi 5'; Cosenza 14' (yellow card) 23'

Cupra Arena at Parc des Expositions de Villepinte, Paris

12 June 2025
20:00
Quarter Finals

Fluxo FC (Brazil)	5–4	(France) PANAM All Starz
Vini Alexandre (yellow card) 4' (goal) 20'; Chaveirinho 20+1', 37' (pen.); Luís Boolt 22'; Nobru 31' (pp)	Report	Bendaoud (red card) 1'; Lesec 1'; Sao 20+1'; L'Ghoul 21'; Pfut 26' (pp)

Cupra Arena at Parc des Expositions de Villepinte, Paris

12 June 2025
21:00
Quarter Finals

Dendele FC (Brazil)	5–6	(Spain) Porcinos FC
Oliveira 1'; Kaká 12', 20+2'; Canhoto (yellow card) 26' (goal) 31' (pen.); Luqueta 36' (pp)	Report	Vacas 3'; Vidal 20+2'; Pelaz 22'; Santos 29'; Louah 40+2' (x2)

Cupra Arena at Parc des Expositions de Villepinte, Paris

12 June 2025
22:00
Quarter Finals

Furia FC (Brazil)	8–1	(France) Unit3d
Victor Hugo 2'; Lima 13'; Jeffinho 18'; Leleti 19', 20+1', 20+2' (pen.); Lipão 40+2' (x2)	Report	Moina (yellow card) 15'; Emmanuel (yellow card) 19'; Sano 27' (yellow card) 40+2'; Diliberto (yellow card) 34'; Scaramozzino (red card) 40+2'

Cupra Arena at Parc des Expositions de Villepinte, Paris

=== Semi-finals ===
13 June 2025
21:00
Semi Finals

Los Troncos FC (Spain)	6–5	(Brazil) Fluxo FC
Amoedo 1'; Nolla 16'; Jiménez 19'; Perxitaa 36' (pp); Boada 37'; Ferres 38' (pen.)	Report	Sanchez 7'; Chaveirinho 20+1'; Luís Boolt 20+2', 40+2' (x2); Helber Jr. (yellow card) 32'

Cupra Arena at Parc des Expositions de Villepinte, Paris

13 June 2025
22:00
Semi Finals

Porcinos FC (Spain)	5–4	(Brazil) Furia FC
Lledó 4'; Llanos 25' (pp); Vidal 27'; Louah 40+1' (x2)	Report	Victor Hugo 1'; Lima 14'; Leleti 19'; Lipão 20+1'

Cupra Arena at Parc des Expositions de Villepinte, Paris

=== Final ===
Pre-Match

On 26 May 2025, before the draw, Congolese singer GIMS was named as the headline act of the opening ceremony (branded as the Music Show)

14 June 2025
21:00

Los Troncos FC (Spain)	6–3	(Spain) Porcinos FC
Planas 1', 3'; Nolla 19', 20+1', 40+2' (x2)	Report	Vidal 20', 32' (pen.); Louah 31'

Paris La Défense Arena, Paris

Champion
Los Troncos FC
1st title

== See also ==
- Media football
- Kings World Cup Clubs
- Kings League
- Kings League Américas
- 2025 Queens Finalissima
