= 2025 Queens Finalissima =

Seven-a-side football match

Las Troncas FC	Peluche Caligari
(Spain)	(Mexico)
5	4
- Date: 13 June 2025
- Venue: Cupra Arena at Parc des Expositions de Villepinte, Paris, France
- MVP: Maria Pi (Las Troncas FC)
- Referee: Manuela Nicolosi (Italy)

The 2025 Queens Finalissima was a women's seven-a-side football match based on the Queens League format, which pitted the top team of the Spanish Queens League against the top team of the Américas Queens League. It is considered the first international club competition of the Queens League franchise (while the teams from the Américas Queens League ostensibly represent the countries of their founding chairpersons, the league is entirely contested in Mexico and most of its players are Mexican). The Finalissima was contested on 13 June 2025 in Paris, concurrently with the 2025 Kings World Cup Clubs.

On April 26, 2025, before the conclusion of the second split of each competition counted towards qualification, Las Troncas FC and Peluche Caligari both mathematically secured their spots as Spain's and the Americas' representatives, respectively.

== Teams ==
Each league's representative was chosen from the champions of the two most recent splits, with the champion club that ranks highest on an aggregate table of both splits' league phases being the selected team.

Team	Qualification
(Spain) Las Troncas FC	Top-ranked 2024/25 Queens League Spain champion on aggregate
(Mexico) Peluche Caligari	Top-ranked 2024/25 Queens League Américas champion on aggregate

== Squads ==
(Spain) Las Troncas FC

Manager: (Spain) Carlos Sánchez
Note: Flags indicate national team as defined under FIFA eligibility rules; some limited exceptions apply. Players may hold more than one non-FIFA nationality.

No.	Pos.	Nation	Player
1	GK	ESP	Maria Pi
3	DF	ESP	Paula Blas
4	DF	ESP	Beatriz Pérez
6	FW	ESP	Mar Dalmau
7	MF	ESP	Paula Nieto
8	DF	ESP	Berta Velasco
9	FW	ESP	Blanca Cros
10	MF	ESP	Aroney González
11	FW	ESP	Zoraida Pichardo
13	GK	ESP	Ainara Navas
18	MF	ESP	Alba Ortiz
19	FW	ESP	Patricia Mascaró

(Mexico) Peluche Caligari

Manager: (Mexico) Ileana Dávila
Note: Flags indicate national team as defined under FIFA eligibility rules; some limited exceptions apply. Players may hold more than one non-FIFA nationality.

No.	Pos.	Nation	Player
3	DF	MEX	Nataly Cárdenas
4	DF	MEX	Fernanda Enríquez
7	DF	MEX	Ahtziri Montero
8	FW	ESP	Alba Mellado
9	FW	MEX	Fernanda Figueroa
10	DF	MEX	Michelle Meléndez
11	FW	MEX	Daniela Leal
12	MF	MEX	Úrsula Reynoso
13	MF	MEX	Imelda Martínez
18	MF	MEX	Andrea Contreras
22	GK	MEX	Dayan Téllez
49	DF	MEX	Marylin Díaz
66	FW	MEX	Salma Sánchez

== Match ==
13 June 2025
19:30

Las Troncas FC (Spain)	5–4	(Mexico) Peluche Caligari
Pi 1', 2'; Velasco 19'; Pichardo 27'; Cros 38' (pen.)	Report	Mellado 1', 38' (pen.); Cárdenas 19'; Martínez 20+3'

Cupra Arena at Parc des Expositions de Villepinte, Paris
Referee: Manuela Nicolosi (Italy)

Champion
Las Troncas FC
1st title
