= Hachim Mastour =

Moroccan footballer (born 1998)

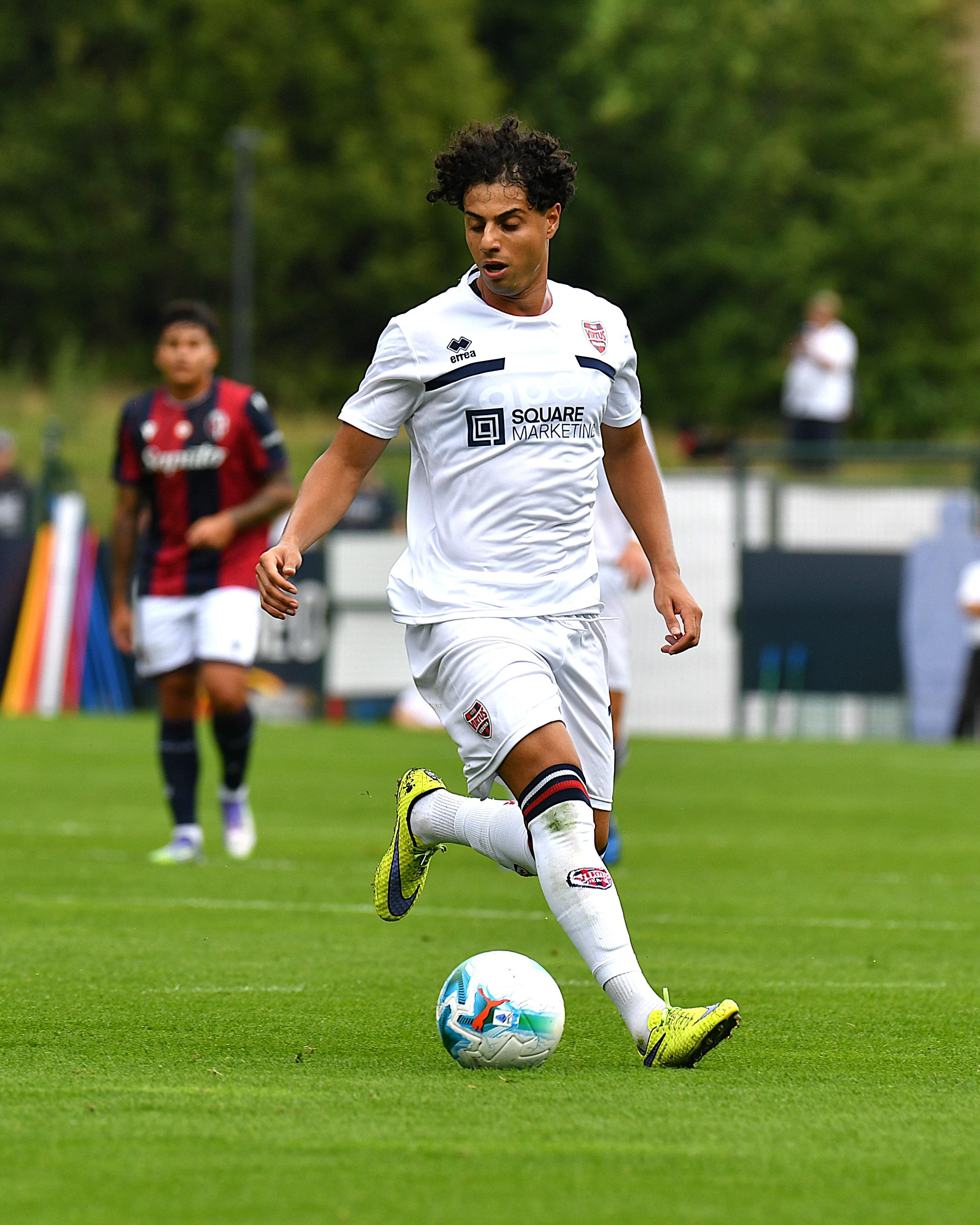
- Mastour with Virtus Verona in 2025

Personal information
- Date of birth: 15 June 1998 (age 28)
- Place of birth: Reggio Emilia, Italy
- Height: 1.77 m (5 ft 10 in)
- Position: Attacking midfielder

Team information
- Current team: Virtus Verona
- Number: 11

Youth career
- 2008–2012: Reggiana
- 2012–2014: AC Milan

Senior career*
Years	Team	Apps	(Gls)
2014–2018	AC Milan	0	(0)
2015–2016	→ Málaga (loan)	1	(0)
2016–2017	→ PEC Zwolle (loan)	5	(0)
2018–2019	Lamia	4	(0)
2019–2021	Reggina	10	(0)
2021	→ Carpi (loan)	10	(1)
2022–2023	Renaissance Zemamra	12	(3)
2023–2024	Union de Touarga	9	(0)
2025–	Virtus Verona	15	(0)

International career^{‡}
2013	Italy U16	7	(1)
2016	Morocco U23	1	(0)
2015	Morocco	1	(0)
2016	Morocco A'	1	(0)
- * Club domestic league appearances and goals as of 30 April 2026 ‡ National team caps and goals as of 27 April 2017

Hachim Mastour (Arabic: هاشم مستور; born 15 June 1998) is a professional footballer who plays as an attacking midfielder or second striker for Serie D club Virtus Verona. Born in Italy, he played for the Morocco national team, becoming Morocco's youngest-ever senior national team player at age 16 in his only senior appearance.

He began his career at Reggiana, and signed for AC Milan for €500,000 at the age of 14. In 2015, he was loaned for two years to Málaga, making only one substitute appearance before the deal was terminated a year early. He was then loaned to PEC Zwolle, before signing for Greek side Lamia on a permanent deal. In 2019 Mastour returned to Italy, playing for Reggina and Carpi in the Serie C. After being clubless for one year, he signed for Renaissance Zemamra in the Moroccan Botola 2, contributing to their promotion back to the first tier. He then signed with Union de Touarga in the first tier of Morocco, before signing with Zeta in the Kings League Italia as a wild-card. In the summer of 2025, he made his return to Italian professional football, signing with Serie C club Virtus Verona.

== Club career ==
=== Youth career ===
Mastour was born to Moroccan parents in Reggio Emilia, Italy. He began playing at his hometown club AC Reggiana, and in early 2012, at the age of 13, he featured for Inter Milan in youth tournaments despite rules prohibiting him from leaving Reggiana until his next birthday. In January of that year, he scored five goals in the Ielasi Memorial tournament, including one in the final against A.S. Roma. After approaches from Juventus, FC Barcelona, Real Madrid, and Manchester City, Mastour moved to Inter's city rivals AC Milan on the recommendation of former manager Arrigo Sacchi, for a fee of €500,000. Shortly after signing, he gave an interview with Sky Italia in which he dribbled and performed kick-ups with a cherry.

=== AC Milan ===
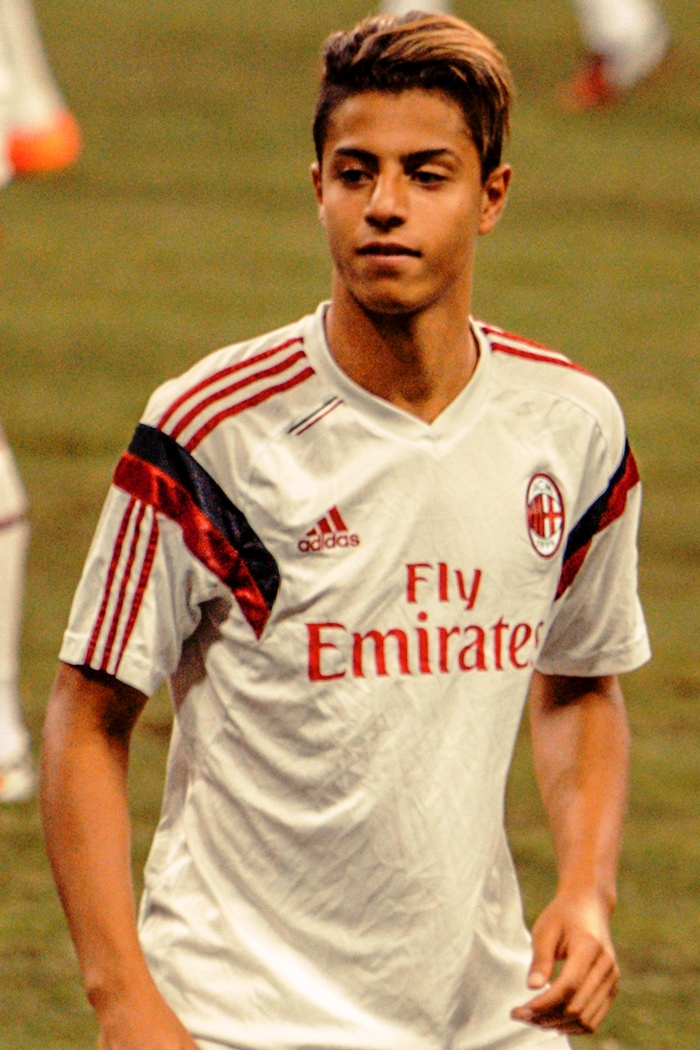
Mastour with AC Milan in 2014.

He was promoted into Milan's first team by manager Clarence Seedorf for the final match of the 2013–14 Serie A season, and would have become the youngest Milan player to feature in the league, but did not come off the bench in the 2–1 win over Sassuolo at the San Siro on 18 May.

==== Loan to Malaga ====
On 31 August 2015, Mastour was loaned to Spain's Málaga CF for two seasons, at the exclusive request of club owner Abdullah al-Thani; as a minor, his transfer to another country had to be approved by FIFA, which was not completed until 5 November. He was first included in a matchday squad for the La Liga home fixture against fellow Andalusians Real Betis two days later, making his competitive club debut in the eventual 0–1 loss by playing five minutes as a substitute for compatriot Adnane Tighadouini. On 7 July 2016, after making one appearance all season, Málaga opted to rescind Mastour's loan contract, and he returned to Milan.

==== Loan to Zwolle ====
On 14 July 2016, Mastour joined Dutch club PEC Zwolle on a season-long loan. He made his Eredivisie debut on 13 August, replacing fellow Moroccan Youness Mokhtar for the final 17 minutes of a 0–3 home loss to Sparta Rotterdam.

Despite initial reports suggesting his contract was expired, Mastour actually returned to Milan at the end of the loan spell, having one year left in his contract.

=== Lamia ===
On 4 September 2018, Super League Greece club Lamia officially announced the signing of Mastour on a free transfer, on a contract worth €200,000 per year. He was reported absent in December, and the following February his father confirmed that this was due to an injury that he alleged was not being treated by the club. Following six goalless appearances in seven months, his deal was terminated by mutual consent on 4 March 2019. The following month, he trained with Parma.

=== Reggina and loan to Carpi ===
Mastour signed a three-year contract with Serie C side Reggina on 18 October 2019. He made his debut on 22 January 2020, as an 81st-minute substitute in a 2–1 home loss to Virtus Francavilla.

On 14 January 2021, after playing the first half of the campaign with Reggina, he was loaned out to Serie C club Carpi until the end of the season. On 24 January, he scored his first professional goal in a 5–1 defeat against Sambenedettese.

=== Renaissance Zemamra and Kings League ===
After being clubless since July 2021, Mastour signed for Moroccan side Renaissance Zemamra in the Botola 2 on 28 June 2022. He scored on his debut for the club, in a 3–1 win against Jenuesse Ben Guerir on 11 September.

In November 2024, he was announced as a wild card for the Kings League team FC Zeta Milano.

=== Virtus Verona ===
On 27 June 2025, Serie C club Virtus Verona announced that they had signed Mastour as a free transfer, on a one-year contract with an extension option for one further season.

== International career ==
Mastour was capped seven times and scored once for the Italy under-16s. He made his international debut on 18 August 2013, playing the first half of a 3–0 friendly victory over Qatar in Borgo Valsugana, and scored a late equaliser in a 2–1 win over Croatia in Umag on 11 March the following year.

Eligible to play for both the Italy national team and the Morocco national team, he announced on 19 May 2015 that he was persuaded to represent the latter, because he felt Morocco to be his country. He was offered the opportunity to have his international debut immediately, while he still had to prove himself to earn a spot for the Italy senior team.

On 12 June 2015, he made his international debut for Morocco in a 2017 Africa Cup of Nations qualification Group F match against Libya at the Stade Adrar in Agadir, replacing Nordin Amrabat for the final two minutes of the 1–0 victory.

After his international debut for Morocco, Mastour was called up to the Morocco A' national football team and Morocco under-23 team for international friendlies against Liberia and Palestine under-23 football teams in 2016.

== Style of play ==
Described as a "fantasista" in Italian, Mastour is a versatile, quick, agile, creative, and skilful player, with strong technique and an ability to read the game; although his favoured role is as an attacking midfielder, he is capable of playing in several attacking roles, and has been deployed as a second striker, or even as a winger.

Mastour claimed at age 14 that his main abilities were his ball control and dribbling. In 2015, Fabio Balaudo of UEFA.com added: "Excellent dribbling skills and sublime technique have made him almost impossible to mark for players in his age group. With great control at speed, a good shot with both feet and the ability to change pace, he is expected to shine behind the forwards or as a winger." A former coach likened Mastour to former Inter midfielder Wesley Sneijder for his ability to orchestrate play from behind the forward line, but his ability in making the ball disappear with his tricks earned him comparisons with Ronaldinho and Neymar as well. Several pundits, including Ivano Pasqualino, have also highlighted Mastour's ball-juggling skills and prowess at free-style football as some of his key strengths and characteristics as a player. In 2014, Omar Danesi, the coach of Milan's under-17 team, praised Mastour's speed and ability to retain the ball from defenders. He predicted a first-team breakthrough, while assuring that Mastour should be given sufficient time to improve beforehand. A.C. Milan youth director, Filippo Galli, said that "nobody at Milan has any doubts about Hachim's ability".

Considered to be a highly promising prospect in his youth, in 2015, The Guardian named him as one of the 50 best young players in the world born in 1998. Despite his talent, however, he has since struggled to establish himself at the professional level and consistently achieve first team football; as such, various pundits have questioned whether he is capable of handling the pressure needed to fulfil his potential. Moreover, Paul Grech felt in 2018 that Mastour lacked the physical strength to succeed at the highest level, given his relatively modest height of 5 ft 9 in (1.75 m). Regarding his limitations as a player, his former Zwolle manager Ron Jans said of him: "He can do wonderful things with a ball, but he must start adding more depth to his game." Regarding Mastour's situation, his former Milan manager, Gennaro Gattuso, commented on the issue in 2018, stating: "We've talked a lot lately. I even threatened him because he became more famous for making videos than playing, but he doesn't do that any more because I told him I'd knock his teeth out! In recent months he's improved some things in training, and we decided to let him play in the Primavera. The train has passed, but he's not 50-years-old, he's 20-years-old [in June] and I think he has to take stock of his mistakes. He needs to play consistently, because we can see he's lost some match sharpness. I've noticed a few improvements, though."

== Career statistics ==
=== Club ===
As of match played 23 February 2026

Appearances and goals by club, season and competition
Club	Season	League			National cup		Continental		Other		Total	
Club	Season	Division	Apps	Goals	Apps	Goals	Apps	Goals	Apps	Goals	Apps	Goals
Milan	2014–15	Serie A	0	0	0	0	—		—		0	0
Milan	2017–18	Serie A	0	0	0	0	—		—		0	0
Milan	Total		0	0	0	0	—		—		0	0
Málaga (loan)	2015–16	La Liga	1	0	0	0	0	0	—		1	0
PEC Zwolle (loan)	2016–17	Eredivisie	5	0	1	0	0	0	—		6	0
Lamia	2018–19	Super League	4	0	2	0	—		—		6	0
Reggina	2019–20	Serie C	1	0	0	0	—		0	0	1	0
Reggina	2020–21	Serie B	9	0	2	0	—		—		11	0
Reggina	Total		10	0	2	0	0	0	0	0	12	0
Carpi (loan)	2020–21	Serie C	10	1	0	0	—		—		10	1
Renaissance Zemamra	2022–23	Botola 2	12	3	0	0	—		—		12	3
Union Touarga	2023-24	Botola	9	0	0	0	—		—		9	0
Virtus Verona	2025–26	Serie C	11	0	1	0	—		—		12	0
Career total			62	4	6	0	0	0	0	0	68	4

=== International ===
As of match played 12 June 2015

Appearances and goals by national team and year
National team	Year	Apps	Goals
Morocco	2015	1	0
Total		1	0

== Honours ==
Renaissance Zemamra

- Botola Pro 2: 2022–23
