= Lanini =

Lanini is an Italian surname. Notable people with the surname include:

- Bernardino Lanini (1511 – c. 1578), Italian Renaissance painter
- Eric Lanini (born 1994), Italian footballer
- Stefano Lanini (born 1994), Italian footballer

== See also ==
- Lanni
