= Campeol =

Campeol is an Italian surname. Notable people with the surname include:

- Ado Campeol (1928–2021), Italian restaurateur
- Axel Campeol (born 2000), Italian football player
