= Fabio Eguelfi =

Italian footballer

Personal information
- Date of birth: 19 January 1995 (age 31)
- Place of birth: Milan, Italy
- Height: 1.78 m (5 ft 10 in)
- Position: Left back

Team information
- Current team: Zeta Milano

Youth career
- Inter Milan

Senior career*
Years	Team	Apps	(Gls)
2014–2017	Inter Milan	0	(0)
2014–2015	→ Prato (loan)	7	(0)
2015	→ Savona (loan)	9	(1)
2015–2016	→ Cremonese (loan)	1	(0)
2016	→ Prato (loan)	16	(1)
2016–2017	→ Pro Vercelli (loan)	14	(0)
2017–2020	Atalanta	0	(0)
2017–2018	→ Cesena (loan)	4	(0)
2018–2019	→ Hellas Verona (loan)	1	(0)
2019	→ Livorno (loan)	5	(0)
2019–2020	→ Frosinone (loan)	0	(0)
2020	→ Feralpisalò (loan)	6	(0)
2021	San Fernando	4	(0)
2022–2023	Imolese	23	(0)
2024	Sant'Angelo	9	(0)
2024–2026	AC Lissone		
2026–	Zeta Milano		

International career
2011	Italy U17	1	(0)
2013	Italy U19	1	(0)
- * Club domestic league appearances and goals as of 8 October 2026

Fabio Eguelfi (born 19 January 1995) is an Italian footballer who plays as a left back for Zeta Milano.

== Club career ==
=== Inter Milan ===
Born in Milan, Lombardy, Eguelfi is a youth product of Inter Milan. He played as a forward for Inter's under-15 team in the 2009–10 season. However, he became a defender in his professional career.

==== Loan to Prato and Savona ====
On 10 July 2014, Eguelfi was signed by Serie C club Prato on a season-long loan deal, rejoining Inter teammate Andrea Bandini and Simone Pasa. On 10 August, Eguelfi made his professional debut with Prato in the first round of Coppa Italia in a 1–0 away defeat against Juve Stabia. On 30 August he made his Serie C debut in a 1–1 away draw against San Marino Calcio, he was replaced by Giulio Grifoni in the 55th minute. On 13 December, Eguelfi played his only entire match for the club in a 1–1 home draw against Grosseto. However, in January 2015, his loan was interrupted and he returned to Inter leaving Prato with only 8 appearances.

On 2 January 2015, Eguelfi was signed by another Serie C club, Savona, on a 6-month loan deal. Six weeks later, on 21 February, he made his debut for Savona as a substitute replacing Nicolò Antonelli in the 63rd minute of a 1–0 away defeat against Ascoli. On 18 March he was sent off with a red card in the 87th minute in 2–2 away draw against Carrarese. On 9 May, Eguelfi scored his first professional goal in the 27th minute of a 2–2 away draw against Pistoiese. Eguelfi ended his 6-month loan to Savona with 11 appearances, including 10 as a starter, scoring 1 goal and making 2 assists.

==== Loan to Cremonese and Prato ====
On 15 July 2015, Eguelfi and Francesco Forte were loaned to Cremonese on a season-long loan deal, as part of the deal that Rey Manaj moved to Inter. On 2 August, he made his debut for the club in the first round of Coppa Italia, he was replaced by Giovanni Formiconi in the 78th minute of a match lost 4–3 on penalties against Brescia. On 29 November he made his only appearances Cremonese in Serie C as a substitute replacing N'Diaye Djiby in the 80th minute of a 1–1 away draw against Südtirol. Eguelfi was re-called to Inter leaving Cremonese with only 2 appearances, he remained an unused substitute for 15 other times.

On 5 January 2016, Eguelfi returned to Prato with a 6-month loan deal . Twelve days later, on 17 January, Eguelfi made his debut for the club in a 1–0 home defeat against Pisa, he played the entire match. On 13 March he scored his first goal of the season for Prato in the 44th minute of a 2–2 away draw against Pistoiese. Eguefi ended his second part of the season to Prato with 18 appearances, all as a starter, scoring 1 goal and making 1 assist, he was replaced only 3 times during the loan. He also helped the club to avoid the relegation in Serie D winning the play-out matches against Lupa Roma.

==== Loan to Pro Vercelli ====
On 15 July 2016, Eguelfi was signed by Serie B club Pro Vercelli on a season.long loan deal. Three weeks later, on 7 August, he made his debut for Pro Vercelli in the second round of Coppa Italia in a 3–1 home win over Reggiana, he played the entire match. He remained an unused substitute for the first part of the season, but on 24 December, Eguefi made his Serie B debut for the club in a 2–1 away defeat against Brescia, playing the entire match. He became a regular starter in second part of the season. Eguelfi ended his season-long loan to Pro Vercelli with 15 appearances, including 13 as a starter, and 2 assists.

=== Atalanta ===
On 30 June 2017, he was sold to Atalanta.

==== Loan to Cesena ====
On 24 July 2017 Eguelfi was loaned out to Serie B side Cesena on season-long loan deal for the 2017–18 season. Three weeks later, on 13 August, he made his debut for Cesena in the third round of Coppa Italia in a 2–1 away defeat against Genoa after extra time, he played the entire match. Two more weeks later, on 28 August, Eguelfi made his Serie B debut for the club in a 3–0 away defeat against Bari, he played the entire match. Eguelfi ended his season-long loan to Cesena with only 5 appearances, all as a starter and he played all entire match, he remained an unused substitute for 25 other matches.

==== Loan to Hellas Verona and Livorno ====
On 18 July 2018 Eguelfi was loaned once again by Atalanta, this time to Serie B club Hellas Verona for the 2018–19 season. On 5 October he made his debut for the club in a 2–0 home defeat against Lecce, he was replaced by Antonino Ragusa after 74 minutes. However, in January 2019, his loan to Hellas Verona was interrupted and he returned to Atalanta after making only one league appearance for the team.

On 31 January 2019, he was loaned again, to Livorno on a 6-month loan deal. Four days later, on 4 February, he made his debut for the club as a substitute replacing Andrea Gasbarro in the 66th minute of a 1–1 away draw against Crotone. On 15 April, Eguelfi played his first match as a starter for the club, a 1–0 home defeat against Brescia, he was replaced after 76 minutes by Nicolò Fazzi. One week later, on 22 April, he played his first entire match for Livorno, a 2–2 away draw against Foggia. Eguelfi ended his second part of the season on loan to Livorno with only 5 appearances.

==== Loan to Frosinone and FeralpiSalò ====
On 12 August 2019, Eguelfi joined Serie B side Frosinone on loan until 30 June 2020. After four months, on 5 December, he made his debut for the club in the fourth round of Coppa Italia in a 2–1 away defeat against Parma, he was replaced Francesco Zampano in the 89th minute. However, in January 2020, his loan to Frosinone was interrupted and he returned to Atalanta with only one appearance in Coppa Italia, staying on the bench during all league games.

On 9 January 2020, Eguelfi was loaned to Serie C club Feralpisalò.

== Career statistics ==
=== Club ===
As of 12 January 2020

Club	Season	League			Cup		Europe		Other		Total	
Club	Season	League	Apps	Goals	Apps	Goals	Apps	Goals	Apps	Goals	Apps	Goals
Prato (loan)	2014–15	Serie C	7	0	1	0	—		—		8	0
Savona (loan)	2014–15	Serie C	9	1	—		—		2 (Note: All appearance(s) in Serie C play-out.)	0	11	1
Cremonese (loan)	2015–16	Serie C	1	0	1	0	—		—		2	0
Prato (loan)	2015–16	Serie C	16	1	—		—		2	0	18	1
Pro Vercelli (loan)	2016–17	Serie B	14	0	1	0	—		—		15	0
Cesena (loan)	2017–18	Serie B	4	0	1	0	—		—		5	0
Hellas Verona (loan)	2018–19	Serie B	1	0	0	0	—		—		1	0
Livorno (loan)	2018–19	Serie B	5	0	—		—		—		5	0
Frosinone (loan)	2019–20	Serie B	0	0	1	0	—		—		1	0
FeralpiSalò (loan)	2019–20	Serie C	0	0	—		—		—		0	0
Career total			57	2	5	0	—		4	0	66	2
