= Axel Campeol =

Italian footballer (born 2000)

Personal information
- Date of birth: 5 March 2000 (age 26)
- Place of birth: Conegliano, Italy
- Height: 1.80 m (5 ft 11 in)
- Position: Left-back

Youth career
- Union Qdp
- –2018: Milan
- 2018–2019: Sampdoria

Senior career*
Years	Team	Apps	(Gls)
2019–2021	Sampdoria	0	(0)
2019–2020	→ Vis Pesaro (loan)	9	(0)
2020–2021	→ Grosseto (loan)	27	(0)
2024–2025	Zeta Milano	17	(0)

International career^{‡}
2015–2016	Italy U16	8	(0)
2016–2017	Italy U17	10	(0)
2017–2018	Italy U18	7	(0)
2018	Italy U19	2	(0)
- * Club domestic league appearances and goals as of 2 May 2021 ‡ National team caps and goals as of 5 December 2018

Axel Campeol (born 5 March 2000) is an Italian content creator and former footballer who played as a left-back.

== Club career ==
Born in Conegliano and raised in Farra di Soligo, Campeol first started playing football at Union Qdp before joining the youth sector of AC Milan, where he spent most of his junior career and started playing for their Under-19 squad in the 2017–18 season. That team notably included fellow future professional footballers Gabriele Bellodi, Raoul Bellanova, Tommaso Pobega, Marco Brescianini, Jørgen Strand Larsen and Frank Tsadjout.

In August 2018, he moved to Sampdoria, where he spent one more year with the Under-19s, without receiving any call-ups to the senior squad.

On 16 July 2019, Campeol was loaned to Serie C club Vis Pesaro. He subsequently made his professional debut for Vis Pesaro on 25 August 2019, during a game against Südtirol: he started the match and was substituted at half-time. He collected nine league appearances during his first professional season.

On 17 September 2020, the defender was loaned once more, this time to fellow Serie C side Grosseto. In Tuscany, he established himself as a regular starter in the team, which eventually reached the play-offs' quarter-finals before losing to AlbinoLeffe.

However, towards the end of July 2021, Campeol announced his retirement at the age of just 21, quoting his growing disillusion with the world of football as one of the main reasons behind his surprising choice.

On August 23, he returns playing football and sign with FC Zeta Milano.

== International career ==
Campeol has been a youth international for Italy at different stages.

He was first called up to represent his country in 2015, when he joined the Under-16 squad.

He then took part in the 2017 UEFA European Under-17 Championship (playing in all three games and starting two of them) as Italy was eliminated in group stage.

Finally, he won caps for the Under-18 and Under-19 national teams.

== After retirement ==
Immediately after retirement, Campeol has kept pursuing a degree in Physical Education at San Raffaele University in Milan: plus, he expressed the desire to give content creation on social media a try, in order to share his personal stories within the world of football.

His first opportunity came just a few months after, when he officially joined the staff of La Giovane Italia (a portal created by journalist Paolo Ghisoni to promote young talents from all over Italy) and took over their YouTube channel.
