= Andrés Llamas =

Italian footballer (born 1998)

Personal information
- Full name: Andrés Llamas Acuña
- Date of birth: 7 May 1998 (age 28)
- Place of birth: Milan, Italy
- Height: 1.85 m (6 ft 1 in)
- Position: Defender

Team information
- Current team: FC Zeta Milano
- Number: 3

Youth career
- Milan

Senior career*
Years	Team	Apps	(Gls)
2018–2019	Milan	0	(0)
2018–2019	→ Pistoiese (loan)	23	(0)
2019–2021	Pistoiese	25	(1)
2021	Carpi	10	(0)
2025-	Zeta Milano	20	(1)

International career^{‡}
2013	Italy U-15	8	(0)
2014	Italy U-16	4	(2)
2013–2015	Italy U-17	25	(7)
2015–2016	Italy U-18	2	(0)
2015–2017	Italy U-19	12	(0)
- * Club domestic league appearances and goals as of 2 May 2021 ‡ National team caps and goals as of 5 September 2017

Andrés Llamas Acuña, known as Andrés Llamas (born 7 May 1998) is an Italian footballer who plays as a defender. He is of Spanish descent.

== Club career ==
He appeared on the bench once for Milan early in the 2015–16 Serie A season, but then was moved back to the youth team.

He made his Serie C debut for Pistoiese on 16 September 2018 in a game against Pro Patria.

On 26 January 2021, he signed with Carpi.

== International ==
He was the captain of Italy national under-17 football team at the 2015 UEFA European Under-17 Championship.
