= Jeda (footballer) =

Brazilian footballer

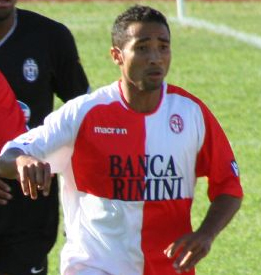
- Jeda with Rimini in 2006

Personal information
- Full name: Jedaias Capucho Neves
- Date of birth: 15 April 1979 (age 47)
- Place of birth: Santarém, Pará, Brazil
- Height: 1.76 m (5 ft 9 in)
- Position: Striker

Team information
- Current team: Zeta Milano
- Number: 27

Senior career*
Years	Team	Apps	(Gls)
2000	União São João	12	(6)
2000–2003	Vicenza	72	(15)
2002	→ Siena (loan)	15	(4)
2004	Palermo	17	(3)
2004–2005	Piacenza	18	(3)
2005	→ Catania (loan)	19	(6)
2005–2006	Crotone	42	(15)
2006–2008	Rimini	58	(24)
2008	→ Cagliari (loan)	20	(3)
2008–2010	Cagliari	62	(17)
2010–2013	Lecce	51	(9)
2011–2012	→ Novara (loan)	24	(3)
2013–2014	Pergolettese	26	(3)
2014	Acqui	14	(3)
2014–2015	Nuorese	15	(5)
2015	Potenza	12	(3)
2015–2016	Casarano	11	(8)
2016–2017	Seregno	13	(2)
2017–2018	Vimercatese Oreno	26	(8)
2019-2020	Muggiò	8	(4)
2024	Riccione	1	(0)
2024-	Zeta Milano	21	(15)

Managerial career
- 2018–2019: Vimercatese Oreno
- 2022: Lecco (under-17)
- * Club domestic league appearances and goals as of 4 April 2025

Jedaias Capucho Neves (born 15 April 1979), better known as Jeda, is a Brazilian footballer who plays as a striker for FC Zeta Milano.

== Playing career ==
Born in Santarém, Pará, Jeda started his career at União São João. He then signed by Vicenza. He made his Serie A debut against Reggina on 23 December 2000. He then found using a fake passport in order to register as an EU player, he was banned for the first half of 2001–02 season.

He followed the club relegated in summer 2001. He made 3 appearances before moved to A.C. Siena on loan. he then played regularly for Vicenza, but transferred to Palermo in January 2004. He won the Serie B Champions in summer 2004, but transferred to Piacenza of Serie B after became surplus of Palermo Serie A campaign. In January 2005, he moved, this time on loan to league rival Catania.

In the summer of 2005, he joined F.C. Crotone, where he scored 15 goals. The following year, he moved to Rimini, where he scored 13 goals in 39 appearances during the 2006–07 season, and 11 goals in 19 appearances during the early part of the 2007–08 season.

In January 2008, he joined Serie A club Cagliari, who was then struggling to keep from relegation. He eventually helped Cagliari recover and maintain their stay at Serie A.

Signing on deadline day in the summer of 2010 from Cagliari, he moved to newly promoted Serie A team Lecce. He scored two goals in the decisive match against Bari on 15 May 2011 which allowed his team to avoid relegation with a game to spare.

After a number of experiences in the minor leagues of Italian football, he retired in 2018 following a season with Eccellenza amateurs Vimercatese Oreno.

== Coaching career ==
After his retirement, he accepted an offer from Vimercatese Oreno to stay at the club on head coaching duty.

== Honours ==
Palermo

- Serie B Champions: 2003–04
