= Lanni =

Lanni is both a given name and a surname. Notable people with the name include:

- Andrew Lanni, Scottish film producer
- Arnold Lanni (born 1956), Canadian record producer
- Lanni Marchant (born 1984), Canadian long-distance runner
- Terrence Lanni (1943-2011), American casino executive

== See also ==
- Lanini
