= PFut =

French streamer and YouTuber

Pfut
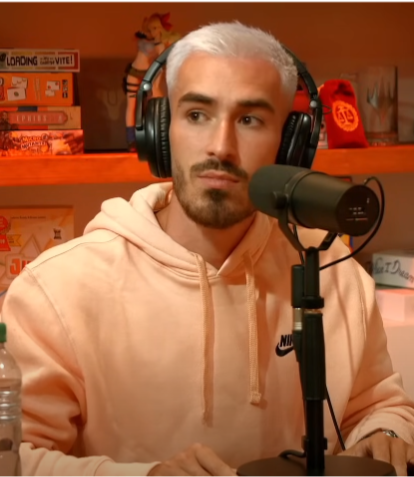
- Born: February 10, 1997 (age 29); Le Blanc-Mesnil, France
- Occupations: YouTuber; entertainment

YouTube information
- Channel: PFUT
- Years active: 2012–present
- Subscribers: 741 thousand
- Views: 110.9 million
- Last updated: November 19, 2025

PFut, also known as Pauleta, born on February 10, 1997, is a French streamer and YouTuber specializing in football and video games.

== Biography ==
Originally from Dammartin-en-Goële in Seine-et-Marne, PFut is a fan of football, especially of Paris Saint-Germain. His pseudonym is a tribute to the striker Pauleta, and he has never revealed his real name, wanting to keep his private life confidential. His interest in video games, combined with his passion for football, led him to create content on the game FIFA in July 2012. Inspired by content creators like Diablox9, he later started uploading football videos on YouTube and Twitch .

In January 2024, he ranked among the twenty most-watched streamers in France on Twitch.

=== Football Videos (2016-present) ===
PFut became known for his series "Les 90," analyzing legendary football matches, and "Les 11", presenting various teams. He also has the "Planète Foot" series covering football news and "Le Tour du monde des stades", where he visits major European stadiums.

His most popular YouTube video, titled "Le pire match de ma vie... La Remontada" was released on March 9, 2017, after Paris was eliminated by Barcelona, marking the start of his "Le pire match de ma vie" series.

=== Eclypsia (2017) ===
In 2017, PFut joined Eclypsia for projects like the web series "En attendant FIFA 18", where he shared predictions on the cover of the game, and hosted live coverage of the Champions League final with fellow streamer Sneaky. However, he left after only three months.

=== Eleven All Stars (2022) ===
In 2022, PFut was selected for the "Eleven All Stars" event organized by AmineMaTue, bringing together French and Spanish streamers on November 19, 2022, at Stade Jean-Bouin in Paris. The French team won 2–0. Although originally a starter, Pfut chose to attend a performance by rapper friend SDM before the game, resulting in a lineup change. He entered the match in the second half as a forward.

=== Koh Survivor RP, Subathon, and Booba (2024) ===
In January 2024, he participated in "Koh Survivor RP," a live role-playing event organized by AmineMaTue, featuring various French streamers.

On July 1, 2024, PFut began a subathon lasting over three weeks on Twitch, hosting various guests from a villa in Marrakech, Morocco. A subathon involves continuous streaming as long as the streamer continues to receive paid subscriptions.

In August 2024, PFut performed the song Scarface at Booba's concert during the Rose Festival in Toulouse. The rapper even stated that he would join one of PFut's live streams.

=== Participation : Stream for Humanity (2025) ===
At the Stream For Humanity charity event, held from January 17 to 19, 2025, PFut took part in activities to support Médecins sans frontières, raising €82,650 for the NGO. The marathon, held at the Jean Bouin stadium, involved nearly 40 streamers, including PFut.

He set "donation goals" for the event, such as testing products, taking on streamers in athletics, or even inviting celebrities like SDM and his father to his streams depending on the sums raised.

The stream also featured a charity soccer match in which PFut scored a brace, including a goal by dribbling past Adil Rami.

== Controversies ==
PFut's career has been marked by several controversies, particularly regarding his use of dark humor, which has led to multiple suspensions on Twitch. In the early 2020s, he was banned three times from the Twitch platform due to his "vulgar and hateful" remarks.

=== Booba and Maes Conflict ===
PFut found himself at the center of a dispute between Booba and Maes when Booba resurfaced a video of PFut criticizing Maes's music.

=== Accusation by Ponce ===
Streamer Ponce accused him of being a "master of harassment and misogyny."

=== Domingo: Popcorn Show ===
After Domingo's comments on Twitch about Pfut, Ravus, and Snakou's participation in his show Popcorn, PFut and Ravus expressed disappointment. PFut said he was hurt and highlighted his adaptability, while Ravus regretted Domingo's narrow view of them.

=== PFut's name mentioned in Ultia's cyberstalking lawsuit ===
On January 21, 2025, PFut reacted to mentions of his name in Ultia's cyberstalking lawsuit. He acknowledged a "mistake" in imitating her during a live show in 2021, and denied any incitement to harassment.

Ultia, who has been the target of attacks since denouncing Inoxtag's sexism at ZEvent in 2021, has testified to the psychological impact of harassment. Some of the accused claimed to have been influenced by PFut, who denies any responsibility.

== Personal life ==
Since November 2021, PFut has been living in Dubai. He also continues to reside in Seine-et-Marne, France, where he has lived since childhood.
