= Diego Almeida =

Ecuadorian-Spanish footballer (born 2004)

Personal information
- Full name: Diego Almeida Crespo
- Date of birth: 12 February 2004 (age 22)
- Place of birth: Rubí, Spain
- Height: 1.84 m (6 ft 0 in)
- Position: Centre-back

Team information
- Current team: Prat

Youth career
- 2011–2023: Barcelona

Senior career*
Years	Team	Apps	(Gls)
2022	Barcelona B	1	(0)
2023–2024	Columbus Crew 2	15	(1)
2024	Sestao River	0	(0)
2024–	Prat	0	(0)

International career^{‡}
2018	Ecuador U15	2	(0)
2018–2019	Spain U15	6	(1)
2019–2020	Spain U16	7	(1)
2019	Spain U17	2	(0)
2021	Spain U18	5	(0)
2021–	Ecuador	1	(0)
- * Club domestic league appearances and goals as of 25 August 2024 ‡ National team caps and goals as of 17:04, 6 December 2021 (UTC)

Diego Almeida Crespo (born 12 February 2004) is a professional footballer who plays as a centre-back for Tercera Federación side Prat. Born in Spain, he represented Ecuador and Spain at youth international level, before making his senior debut for Ecuador in 2021.

== Club career ==
Born in Rubí, Barcelona, Catalonia, in 2018, Almeida was called up to the Ecuador national under-15 football team, the country of his parents, playing two games. Following this, he would go on to represent the country of his birth, Spain, from under-15 to under-18 level.

On 9 October 2024, Almeida joined Prat in the fifth-tier Tercera Federación.

== International career ==
Following his registration to become a naturalised Ecuadorian citizen, Almeida made his debut in a 1–1 draw against El Salvador on 5 December 2021, coming on as a second-half substitute for Gustavo Vallecilla.

== Career statistics ==
=== Club ===
As of 29 September 2022.

Appearances and goals by club, season and competition
Club	Season	League			Cup		Europe		Other		Total	
Club	Season	Division	Apps	Goals	Apps	Goals	Apps	Goals	Apps	Goals	Apps	Goals
Barcelona Atlètic	2021–22	Primera División RFEF	1	0	—		—		—		1	0
Barcelona Atlètic	Total		1	0	—		—		—		1	0
Career total			1	0	—		—		—		1	0

=== International ===
As of matches played 6 December 2021.

National team	Year	Apps	Goals
Ecuador	2021	1	0
Total		1	0
