= Cristian Brocchi =

Italian footballer and coach (born 1976)

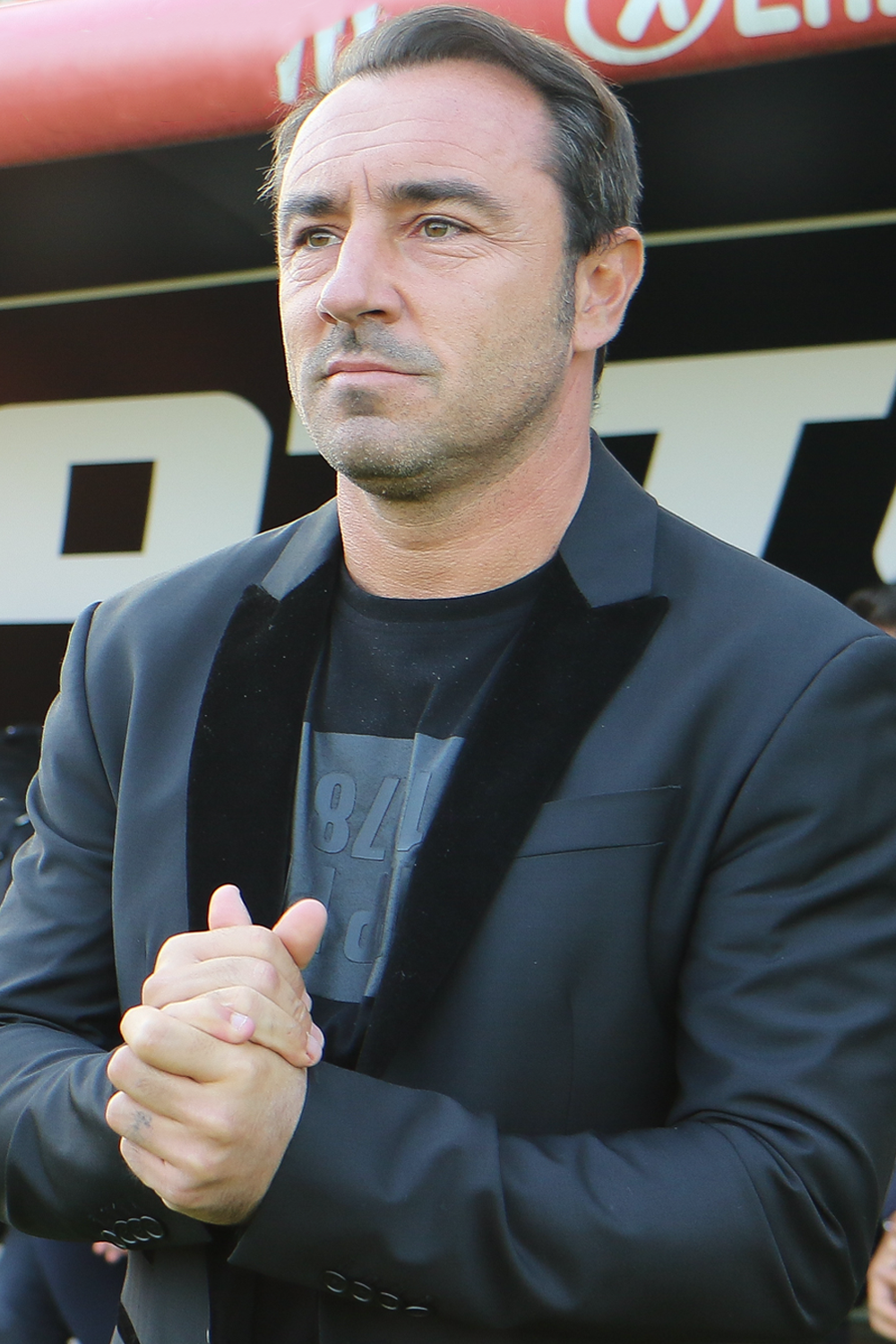
- Brocchi as head coach of Monza in 2021

Personal information
- Full name: Cristian Brocchi
- Date of birth: 30 January 1976 (age 50)
- Place of birth: Milan, Italy
- Height: 1.71 m (5 ft 7 in)
- Position: Defensive midfielder

Team information
- Current team: FC Zeta

Youth career
- AC Milan

Senior career*
Years	Team	Apps	(Gls)
1994–1998	AC Milan	0	(0)
1995–1997	→ Pro Sesto (loan)	57	(3)
1997–1998	→ Lumezzane (loan)	30	(4)
1998–2000	Verona	59	(8)
2000–2001	Inter Milan	15	(1)
2001–2008	AC Milan	99	(4)
2005–2006	→ Fiorentina (loan)	35	(3)
2008–2013	Lazio	111	(2)
Total		406	(24)

International career
2006	Italy	1	(0)

Managerial career
- 2016: AC Milan
- 2016–2017: Brescia
- 2018–2021: Monza
- 2021–2022: Vicenza
- * Club domestic league appearances and goals

Cristian Brocchi (Italian pronunciation: [ˈkristjam ˈbrɔkki]; born 30 January 1976) is an Italian professional football manager and former player.

As a defensive midfielder, Brocchi was rated for his durability and tackling. He began his career with hometown club AC Milan, but he struggled to break into the first team as a youngster. He was subsequently loaned to Pro Sesto and Lumezzane before being sold to Hellas Verona in 1998. His performances for the club earned him a move to Inter Milan in 2000, where he also struggled due to injury. He returned to Milan in 2001, and went on to represent the club for the next seven seasons, aside from a season on loan with Fiorentina, during a highly successful period for the club, which saw him win the Serie A and two UEFA Champions League titles, among other trophies. He ended his career in 2013, after five seasons with Lazio, with whom they won the Coppa Italia twice. At international level, he made his only appearance for the Italy national team in 2006.

Brocchi began his senior managerial career at Milan in April 2016, after being their youth team's head coach since 2014. After only one month, he was sacked and was then appointed head coach of Brescia in the Serie B. In 2018, Brocchi became head coach of Serie C side Monza, helping them gain promotion to the Serie C for the first time in 19 years. He was dismissed in 2021 after failing promotion to the Serie A.

== Club career ==
=== Early career ===
Starting his career at AC Milan's youth system, Brocchi was loaned to Pro Sesto and Lumezzane in the early years. After struggling to find space in the first team, Brocchi was sold to Serie B side Hellas Verona in 1998. He helped the club obtain promotion to Serie A.

=== Inter Milan ===
After a year in the top division, Inter Milan coach Marcello Lippi signed Brocchi in 2000. However, Brocchi and Inter endured a difficult season, as Lippi was sacked after their opening Serie A match, a defeat to Reggina. Marco Tardelli was hired as Lippi's replacement, and he guided the Nerazzurri to a fifth-place finish in Serie A. The following season, new Inter manager Héctor Cúper decided to sell Brocchi. Brocchi later described his time at Inter "as the worst experience [he] ever had", citing the lack of support from the club while injured.

=== AC Milan (second spell) ===
In July 2001, Milan re-signed him in exchange for Andrés Guglielminpietro, who joined Inter. While at Milan, Brocchi had to compete with the likes of Fernando Redondo, Gennaro Gattuso, Andrea Pirlo, Massimo Ambrosini, and later Clarence Seedorf.

=== Fiorentina ===
Brocchi was loaned to Fiorentina in July 2005, with a view to a permanent deal at the end of the season. However, at the end of 2005–06, he returned to Milan, partly as a result of the problems Milan faced in finding new recruits due to the 2006 Italian football scandal.

=== AC Milan (third spell) ===
Brocchi made a career high 29 Serie A appearances in the 2006–07 season. Although Emerson arrived in the 2007–08, Brocchi continued to appear regularly making 24 appearances, 10 as starter, effectively becoming manager Carlo Ancelotti's first choice replacement in midfield.

=== Lazio ===
Milan and Lazio reached an agreement for a permanent transfer for Brocchi on 29 August 2008. He signed a three-year deal with Lazio and just cost Lazio a nominal transfer fee. His first season was successful as he won the Coppa Italia, Lazio's fifth Coppa Italia title.

Following the 2012–13 season, Brocchi and Lazio announced his retirement due to ongoing injury problems.

== International career ==
Brocchi made his international debut and only appearance for the Italy national team under Roberto Donadoni, in a 1–1 friendly home draw against Turkey, on 15 November 2006.

== Managerial career ==
=== Early career ===
On 12 April 2016, Brocchi was appointed the head coach of Milan for his first senior managerial position, after previously serving as the coach of the AC Milan youth team, replacing Siniša Mihajlović after his sacking. On 28 June 2016, Brocchi was replaced by Vincenzo Montella.

Brocchi served as head coach of Serie B club Brescia during the 2016–17 season, being removed from his managerial duties on 12 March 2017 due to poor results. He worked as Fabio Capello's assistant at Jiangsu Suning during the 2017 Chinese Super League.

=== Monza ===
In October 2018, Brocchi was named the new head coach of Serie C club Monza, under the ownership of the former Milan duo of Silvio Berlusconi and Adriano Galliani. After failing promotion to the play-offs in his first season in charge, he successfully guided Monza to win the 2019–20 Serie C title. He was, therefore, confirmed for a third season at the helm of the club, with the explicit goal to bring the Brianzoli to Serie A for the first time in their history.

In the 2020–21 Serie B season, Monza narrowly missed out on automatic promotion, finishing third, and was subsequently eliminated by sixth-placed Cittadella in the play-off semifinals. Following these results, Brocchi left Monza by mutual consent on 28 May 2021.

=== Vicenza ===
On 22 September, Brocchi was named as the new coach of Vicenza. Taking over with Vicenza in deep relegation trouble, he however failed to turn around the club's fortunes, and was dismissed on 11 April 2022.

=== Kings League ===
In November 2024, Brocchi was appointed as head coach for Kings League team FC Zeta Milano.

== Personal life ==
Outside of football, Brocchi opened a cafe in Milan along with former Milan teammate Christian Abbiati and started his clothing brand (Baci & Abbracci) with close friend and footballer Christian Vieri and model Alena Šeredová.

== Career statistics ==
=== Club ===
Appearances and goals by club, season and competition
Club	Season	League	League		Cup		Europe		Other		Total	
Club	Season	League	Apps	Goals	Apps	Goals	Apps	Goals	Apps	Goals	Apps	Goals
Inter Milan	2000–01	Serie A	15	1	0	0	0	0	0	0	15	1
AC Milan	2001–02	Serie A	12	1	0	0	7	0	0	0	19	1
AC Milan	2002–03	Serie A	12	2	1	0	7	0	0	0	20	2
AC Milan	2003–04	Serie A	11	0	0	0	3	0	0	0	14	0
AC Milan	2004–05	Serie A	11	0	0	0	2	0	0	0	13	0
AC Milan	Total		46	3	1	0	19	0	3	0	66	3
Fiorentina	2005–06	Serie A	35	3	0	0	0	0	0	0	35	3
AC Milan	2006–07	Serie A	29	1	0	0	8	0	0	0	37	1
AC Milan	2007–08	Serie A	24	1	2	1	3	0	3	0	32	2
AC Milan	Total		53	2	2	1	11	0	3	0	69	3
Lazio	2008–09	Serie A	31	0	4	0	0	0	0	0	35	0
Lazio	2009–10	Serie A	27	2	2	0	3	0	1	0	33	2
Lazio	2010–11	Serie A	31	0	2	0	0	0	0	0	33	0
Lazio	2011–12	Serie A	15	0	0	0	3	1	0	0	18	1
Lazio	2012–13	Serie A	7	0	3	0	0	0	0	0	10	0
Lazio	Total		111	2	11	0	6	1	1	0	129	3
Career total			260	11	0	0	0	0	0	0	314	13

=== Managerial ===
As of 30 April 2022

Managerial record by team and tenure
Team	Nat	From	To	Record							
Team	Nat	From	To	G	W	D	L	GF	GA	GD	Win %
AC Milan	(Italy)	12 April 2016	28 June 2016	7	2	2	3	7	9	−2	28.57
Brescia	(Italy)	10 July 2016	12 March 2017	31	7	10	14	32	45	−13	22.58
Monza	(Italy)	22 October 2018	28 May 2021	116	60	33	23	177	104	+73	51.72
Vicenza	(Italy)	22 September 2021	11 April 2022	32	8	7	17	33	48	−15	25.00
Total				186	77	52	57	249	206	+43	41.40

== Honours ==
=== Player ===
Milan

- Serie A: 2003–04
- Coppa Italia: 2002–03
- Supercoppa Italiana: 2004
- UEFA Champions League: 2002–03, 2006–07
- UEFA Super Cup: 2007
- FIFA Club World Cup: 2007

Lazio

- Coppa Italia: 2008–09, 2012–13
- Supercoppa Italiana: 2009

=== Manager ===
Monza

- Serie C Group A: 2019–20
