= Stefano Lanini =

Italian footballer

Personal information
- Date of birth: 4 September 1994 (age 32)
- Place of birth: Milan, Italy
- Height: 1.86 m (6 ft 1 in)
- Position: Right back

Team information
- Current team: Zeta Milano

Youth career
- Enotria 1908

Senior career*
Years	Team	Apps	(Gls)
2011–2012	Sant'Angelo		
2012–2015	Caronnese	73	(2)
2015–2017	Virtus Entella	1	(0)
2015–2016	→ Pistoiese (loan)	19	(1)
2016–2017	→ Fano (loan)	34	(0)
2017–2018	Fano	29	(0)
2018–2019	Giana Erminio	19	(0)
2019	NibionnOggiono	13	(0)
2019–	Olginatese		

International career
2015	Italy U-20	1	(0)
- * Club domestic league appearances and goals as of 23:51, 4 February 2020 (UTC)

Stefano Lanini (born 4 September 1994) is an Italian football player. He plays for FC Zeta Milano.

== Club career ==
He made his Serie B debut for Virtus Entella on 14 February 2015 in a game against Trapani.

On 29 August 2019, he joined Serie D club NibionnOggiono. In December 2019, he then joined U.S.D. Olginatese.
