= Nobru =

Brazilian streamer

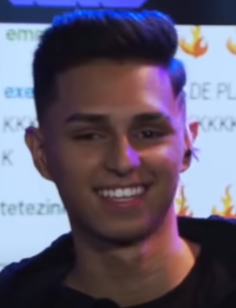
- Santos in 2020

Personal information
- Name: Bruno Goes dos Santos
- Born: January 20, 2001 (age 25); São Paulo, Brazil

Current team
- Team: Fluxo
- Game: Free Fire

Career information
- Playing career: 2019–present

Team history
- 2019–2021: Corinthians
- 2021–present: Fluxo

Twitch information
- Channel: nobru
- Years active: 2020–2022
- Followers: 3.7 million
- Last updated: December 2022

Bruno Goes dos Santos (born January 20, 2001, São Paulo), better known as Nobru, is a Brazilian streamer, digital influencer, professional Free Fire player and businessman.

== Biography ==
Robert was born on January 20, 2001, in the city of São Paulo and always dreamed of being a soccer player, but ended up investing in the games area. His passion for electronic sports came when he started playing Free Fire — at the time, on his father's cell phone. His father, unemployed and in need of the device to deliver CVs, did not accept his son's decision well, but Bruno did not stop and, at the age of 18, he took the game seriously. In 2019, Nobru was hired by Corinthians, which that year debuted in the Free Fire professional league. In the same year, the team was Free Fire world champion, with Nobru being the MVP. Nobru was also chosen as the best Free Fire athlete of 2019.

== Awards and nominations ==
Year	Ceremony	Category	Result	Ref.
2019	eSports Brazil Award	Best Athlete	Won	
2019	eSports Brazil Award	Best Free Fire Athlete	Won	
2020	eSports Awards	Best Mobile eSports Player of the Year	Nominated	
2020	Prêmio Jovem Brasileiro	Gamer of the Year	Won	
2022	The Game Awards	Content Creator of the Year	Nominated	
