= Parc des Expositions de Villepinte =

Convention centre near Paris in France

Coordinates: 48°58′16″N 2°31′03″E

Logo of Paris Nord Villepinte

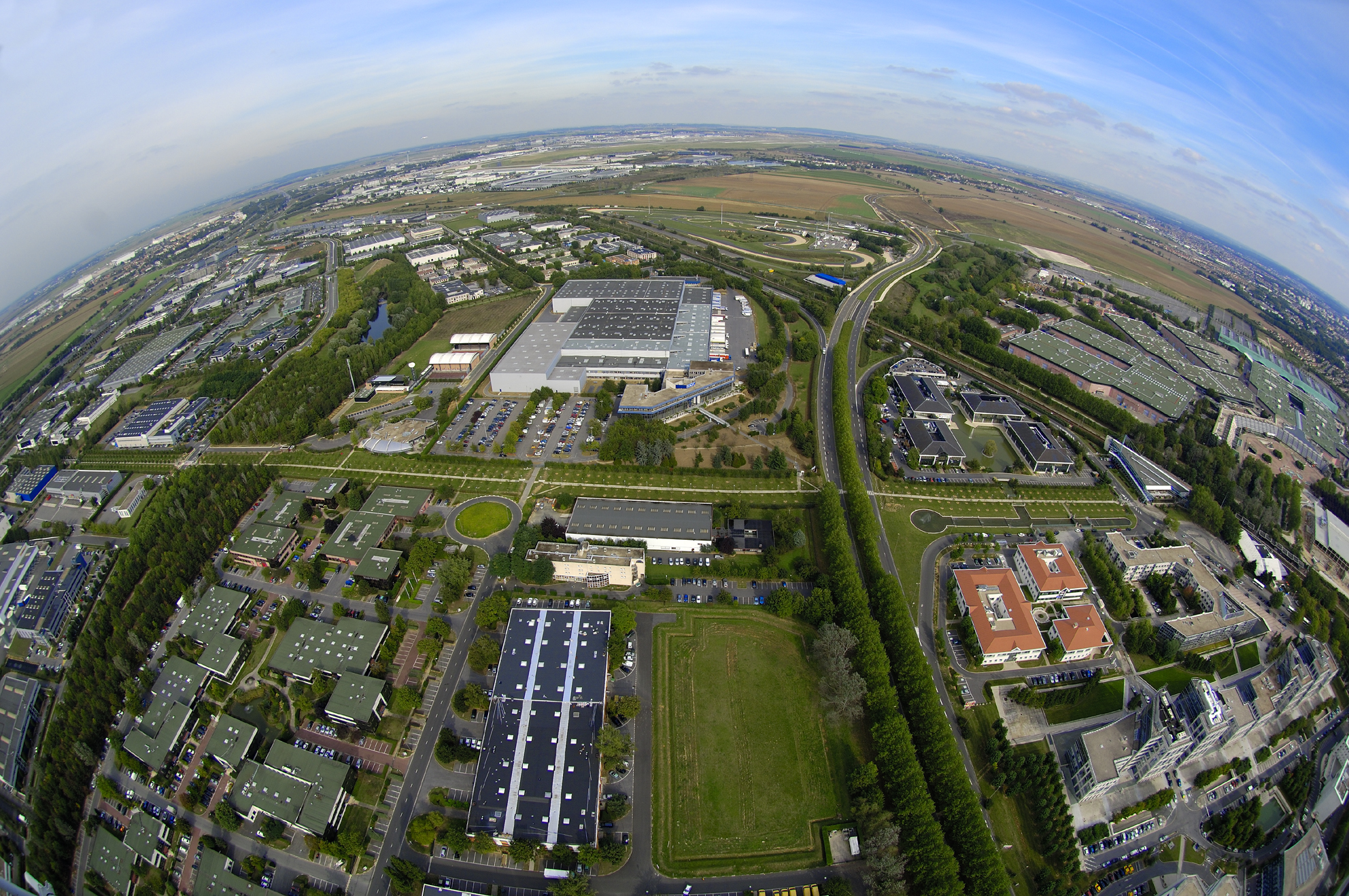
Aerial view of the Parc des Expositions

Parc des expositions de Paris-Nord Villepinte, also known as Paris Nord Villepinte, is a large convention center located in Villepinte near Paris-Charles de Gaulle Airport. The center opened in 1982 and is the second-largest in France.

The center encompasses 115 hectares and has 246,000 m^{2} of convention space in eight halls. The center is served by the Parc des Expositions station on the RER B. Paris Nord Villepinte is one metro stop from Charles de Gaulle Airport and 30 minutes from Gare du Nord, Châtelet-Les Halles, Saint Michel RER B stations in Paris city.

Managed by Viparis, Paris Nord Villepinte Convention and Exhibition Centre hosts many international professional and consumer exhibitions and conventions, such as All4pack, Europain, Eurosatory, Expofil, Intermat, Maison & Objet, SIAL, Silmo and IPA.

At the 2024 Summer Olympics, Villepinte was known as the Arena Paris Nord and was configured to a capacity of 6,000. It hosted boxing preliminaries and quarterfinals, the fencing portion of the modern pentathlon, and hosted the volleyball competitions of the 2024 Summer Paralympics.
