= FC Zeta Milano =

Association football club in Italy

Zeta Milano
- Full name: Football Club Zeta Milano
- Nickname: Zeta
- Founded: 22 May 2024; 2 years ago
- Ground: Centro Sportivo di Cilissone; Lissone, Lombardy
- President: Antonio Pellegrino
- Head coach: Fabio Mascetti
- League: Prima Categoria (Group B)
- 2025–26: Seconda Categoria Milan – Group Q, 1st of 16 (promoted)
- Website: zetaworld.it
Home colours	Away colours	Third colours

Football Club Zeta Milano, commonly known as Zeta Milano or colloquially as Zeta (pronounced [ˈd͡zeːta]), is an Italian football club based in Milan, Lombardy. The club competes in Prima Categoria, the seventh tier of the Italian football league system.

Founded in 2024 by Antonio Pellegrino, better known online as ZWJackson, the club has been described by Italian media as a football project combining amateur football with digital content creation and social media.

== History ==
The club was officially founded on 22 May 2024 by 26-year-old YouTuber Antonio Pellegrino, better known online as ZWJackson. Known for his content on sports video games such as FIFA and EA Sports FC, Pellegrino had previously played in Italy's Terza Categoria with Play2Give and had been included in La Fiorita's squad for the UEFA Champions League qualifying rounds.

In May 2024, Pellegrino announced the creation of the club through his Instagram profile, presenting it as a social-media-driven football project. Followers were involved in choosing the team's name, colours and crest. The final choice was FC Zeta Milano, with red, white and black as the club colours. The crest was later announced by Italian actor Paolo Ruffini.

After announcing Umberto Maria Chiaramonte as head coach and choosing the "Gaetano Scirea" sports field in Buccinasco as the club's first home ground, the club announced former Serie A forward Jeda as its first signing.

Once the squad was assembled, the club was registered in Terza Categoria, in Group C of the Milan section. The official debut took place on 8 September 2024 in the Coppa Lombardia, with a 7–0 win over Lacchiarella. The match was documented by Pellegrino through a vlog on his YouTube channel, as part of the club's wider media project. The team also opened its league campaign with a 4–0 away win over Virtus Abbiatense.

During the winter break, Zeta Milano played a friendly against former Serie A side Siena. The match ended 7–0 in favour of Siena, giving Zeta Milano its first defeat.

On 16 March 2025, after an unbeaten run in the league, Zeta Milano mathematically secured promotion to Seconda Categoria by winning its Terza Categoria group. Following the league win, the club registered television presenter Alessandro Cattelan as a player, and later influencer Luca Campolunghi, chairman of a club in the Kings League Italia. Both appeared in official matches. Later in the season, Zeta Milano won the Coppa Lombardia Terza Categoria with a 2–0 victory over Polisportiva Pessina.

At the end of the season, on 24 May 2025, Pellegrino announced that for the 2025–26 season the club would no longer play in Buccinasco, moving instead to the Campo Sportivo Comunale Luigi Fabbri in Trezzano sul Naviglio. He also announced the creation of a youth section named Zeta Future.

A few days later, Chiaramonte resigned as head coach, while Cristian Brocchi, former coach of the club's Kings League team, was appointed general director. On 1 August 2025, former Serie A player Dario Hübner was announced as head coach.

During the 2025–26 season, Zeta Milano won Group Q of the Milan section of Seconda Categoria, earning a second consecutive promotion and reaching Prima Categoria. The team secured promotion with two matches remaining, after collecting 75 points from 28 matches; according to SerieD24, it had scored 107 goals at that stage and had both the best attack and the best defence in the group. The club also reached the final of the Coppa Lombardia Seconda Categoria, where it lost 2–1 to Triuggese.

On 9 May 2026, Cristian Brocchi resigned as head coach of the first team after the club's league win. He remained at Zeta Milano, returning to the role of general manager.

On 19 June 2026, the club announced that it would move its home ground and training facilities to the Centro Sportivo di Cilissone in Lissone. On 12 July, Fabio Mascetti was appointed head coach.

On 25 September 2026, streamer Gianmarco Tocco, known as Blur, became a shareholder in the club.

== Kings League ==
FC Zeta also operates in the Kings League ecosystem. In January 2026, Como 1907, Como Gaming Club and FC Zeta announced the creation of Zeta Como, a Kings League team intended to connect Como's professional football brand with digital communities and the entertainment-based football format.

== Players ==
=== Current squad ===
As of 17 October 2026

Note: Flags indicate national team as defined under FIFA eligibility rules; some limited exceptions apply. Players may hold more than one non-FIFA nationality.

No.	Pos.	Nation	Player
1	GK	ITA	Alessio Buono
3	DF	ITA	Andrés Llamas Acuña
5	MF	MAR	Mattia El Hilali
7	FW	ITA	Elia Ferrario
8	MF	ITA	Luca L'Erede
10	FW	ITA	Kevin Girgenti
11	DF	ITA	Fabio Eguelfi
14	DF	ITA	Andrea Tarasco (captain)
17	FW	ITA	Edoardo Matta
18	MF	ITA	Alessandro Fratus
20	MF	SUI	Gioele Salvadore
21	FW	ITA	Filippo Alberto Nahum

No.	Pos.	Nation	Player
22	GK	ITA	Francesco Ambrosio
23	FW	ITA	Matteo Capitani
27	DF	ITA	Niccolò Ciceri
28	MF	ITA	Erick Diana
29	DF	ITA	Stefano Lanini
33	DF	ITA	Alessio Marcone
45	FW		Fallou Cisse
50	MF	ITA	Edoardo Maio
74	DF	ITA	Duccio Guasti
77	FW	ITA	David Speziale
82	DF	ITA	Lorenzo Mantovani
90	MF	ITA	Simone Soprano

== Coaching staff ==
=== Managers ===
Name	Nationality	Years
Umberto Maria Chiaramonte	(Italy)	2024–2025
Dario Hübner	(Italy)	2025
Cristian Brocchi	(Italy)	2025–2026
Fabio Mascetti	(Italy)	2026–2026

=== Current technical staff ===
As of 17 October 2026

Position	Name
Head coach	Fabio Mascetti
Assistant coach	Luca Sorrentino
Goalkeeping coach	Max Pirotta
Fitness coach	Andrea Gonzales
Match analyst	Giuseppe Barraco

=== Club personnel ===
Position	Name
President	Antonio Pellegrino
Vice-president	Umberto Maria Chiaramonte
Honorary president	Gianmarco Tocco (Blur)
General manager	Cristian Brocchi
Sporting director	Stefano De Vita
Executive director	Jacopo Mulinacci
Team manager	Jacopo Famiglietti

== Honours ==
- Terza Categoria
  - Winners (1): 2024–25 (Group C)
- Seconda Categoria
  - Winners (1): 2025–26 (Group Q)
- Coppa Lombardia Terza Categoria
  - Winners (1): 2024–25
- Coppa Lombardia Seconda Categoria
  - Runners-up (1): 2025–26
