= 2025–26 Le Mans FC season =

Le Mans
2025–26 season
- Owner: OutField Inc
- President: Pedro Oliveira
- Head coach: Patrick Videira
- Stadium: Stade Marie-Marvingt
- Ligue 2: 2nd (promoted)
- Coupe de France: Round of 16
colours	colours	colours

The 2025-26 season will be Le Mans FC 40th season in the clubs history.During this season the club will have participated in the following competitions:Ligue 2, Coupe de France.

== Players ==
=== Current squad ===
As of 8 September 2026.

Note: Flags indicate national team as defined under FIFA eligibility rules; some limited exceptions apply. Players may hold more than one non-FIFA nationality.

No.	Pos.	Nation	Player
1	GK	FRA	Ewan Hatfout
5	DF	MTQ	Harold Voyer
6	MF	CAF	Edwin Quarshie (captain)
7	FW	ALG	Billal Brahimi
8	MF	FRA	Alexandre Lauray
9	FW	FRA	Antoine Rabillard
10	MF	FRA	Jean Vercruysse
11	MF	ALG	Adil Bourabaa
12	DF	BRA	João Almeida (on loan from Coritiba)
13	FW	SEN	Habib Diallo
14	FW	CAF	Louis Mafouta
15	DF	FRA	Noa Boissé
16	DF	ESP	Raúl Torrente (on loan from Dinamo Zagreb)
17	DF	FRA	Samuel Yohou
18	DF	FRA	Lucas Buades

No.	Pos.	Nation	Player
19	DF	FRA	Djibril Sidibé
20	FW	FRA	William Harhouz
21	DF	FRA	Théo Eyoum
22	DF	FRA	Lucas Calodat
23	MF	FRA	Daouda Traoré (on loan from Southampton)
25	FW	SEN	Dame Gueye
26	DF	FRA	Rayan Bamba (on loan from Rennes)
27	MF	FRA	Martin Rossignol
28	FW	FRA	Erwan Colas
29	MF	FRA	Lucas Bretelle
55	GK	FRA	Augustin Delbecque
76	DF	ALG	Yasser Larouci
98	GK	FRA	Nicolas Kocik
99	FW	BRA	Enzo Vagner (on loan from Coritiba)

=== Out on loan ===
Note: Flags indicate national team as defined under FIFA eligibility rules; some limited exceptions apply. Players may hold more than one non-FIFA nationality.

No.	Pos.	Nation	Player
—	DF	FRA	Nathan Tronchet (at Haguenau until 30 June 2027)
—	MF	FRA	Izhak Hammoudi (at Bourges until 30 June 2027)

== Competitions ==
Win Draw Loss

=== Overall record ===
Competition	First match	Last match	Starting round	Final position	Record							
Competition	First match	Last match	Starting round	Final position	Pld	W	D	L	GF	GA	GD	Win %
Ligue 2	9 August 2025	9 May 2026	Matchday 1	2nd	34	16	14	4	50	31	+19	47.06
Coupe de France	15 November 2025	3 February 2026	Seventh round	Round of 16	5	4	0	1	5	7	−2	80.00
Total					39	20	14	5	55	38	+17	51.28

Source: Competitions

=== Club Friendlies ===
12 July 2025 Friendly	UNFP (France)	1-2	(France) Le Mans FC
18:00	Anthony Goelzer 45+2'	Report	Gueye 76' 90'

19 July 2025 Friendly	Le Havre (France)	0-1	(France) Le Mans FC	Le Havre
18:00	Ebonog (yellow card) 33'	Report	Lauray 11'; Vercruysse (yellow card) 40'	Stadium: Stade Océane

23 July 2025 Friendly	Quevilly-Rouen (France)	2-4	(France) Le Mans FC	Le Petit-Quevilly
18:30	Kapokyeng Sylva 20'; Jordan Leborgne 53' (pen.)	Report	Rossignol 11'; Gueye 43'; Luvambo 63'; Rabillard 78'	Stadium: Stade Robert Diochon

26 July 2025 Friendly	Fleury 91 (France)	1-2	(France) Le Mans FC	Fleury-Mérogis
18:00	Farade 75'	Report	Vercruysse 13'; Rabillard 100'	Stadium: Stade Auguste Gentelet

1 August 2025 Friendly	Le Mans FC (France)	2-0	(France) Caen	Le Mans
18:30	Vercruysse 77'; Lauray 90+2'	Report		Stadium: Stade Marie-Marvingt

=== Ligue 2 ===
==== League table ====
Pos	Team	Pld	W	D	L	GF	GA	GD	Pts	Promotion or Relegation
1	Troyes (C, P)	34	20	7	7	60	33	+27	67	Promotion to Ligue 1
2	Le Mans (P)	34	16	14	4	50	31	+19	62	Promotion to Ligue 1
3	Saint-Étienne	34	18	6	10	59	38	+21	60	Qualification for promotion play-off semi-final
4	Red Star	34	16	10	8	45	37	+8	58	Qualification for promotion play-off quarter-final
5	Rodez	34	15	13	6	45	39	+6	58	Qualification for promotion play-off quarter-final
6	Reims	34	14	14	6	53	35	+18	56	
7	Annecy	34	15	7	12	49	39	+10	52	
8	Montpellier	34	14	9	11	41	31	+10	51	
9	Pau	34	12	9	13	48	62	−14	45	
10	Dunkerque	34	11	10	13	53	45	+8	43	
11	Guingamp	34	10	10	14	42	49	−7	40	
12	Grenoble	34	8	15	11	33	39	−6	39	
13	Clermont	34	9	10	15	38	44	−6	37	
14	Nancy	34	9	10	15	35	52	−17	37	
15	Boulogne	34	9	9	16	34	49	−15	36	
16	Laval (O)	34	6	14	14	30	48	−18	32	Qualification for relegation play-off
17	Bastia (R)	34	5	13	16	23	39	−16	28	Relegation to Ligue 3
18	Amiens (R)	34	6	6	22	37	65	−28	24	Relegation to Ligue 3

Source: Ligue 2
Rules for classification: 1) Points; 2) Goal difference; 3) Number of goals scored; 4) Head-to-head goal difference; 5) Fair play points
(C) Champions; (O) Play-off winners; (P) Promoted; (R) Relegated

==== Results summary ====
Overall								Home						Away					
Pld	W	D	L	GF	GA	GD	Pts	W	D	L	GF	GA	GD	W	D	L	GF	GA	GD
34	16	14	4	50	31	+19	62	9	6	2	20	8	+12	7	8	2	30	23	+7

Source: Ligue 1

==== Results by round ====
Round	1
Ground	
Result	
Position	

Source: Ligue 2
A = Away; H = Home; W = Win; D = Draw; L = Loss

==== Matches ====
9 August 2025 1	Guingamp	3-3	Le Mans	Guingamp
15:00 CEST	Ourega (yellow card) 30'; Albin Demouchy 72'; Siwe (yellow card) 74'; Gomis 87'; Mafouta 90+9' (yellow card) 90+9'	Report	Quarshie 18'; Ribelin 40'; Yohou (yellow card) 45+3'; Harhouz 90+11' (yellow card) 90+11' (yellow-red card) 90+12'	Stadium: Stade de Roudourou; Attendance: 9,176; Referee: (France) Aurélien Petit

18 August 2025 2	Le Mans	1-2	Montpellier	Le Mans
20:45 CEST	Calodat (yellow card) 71'; Vercruysse (yellow card) 87'; Lauray (yellow card) 90+5'; Gueye 90+6'	Report	Sainte-Luce (yellow card) 35'; Coulibaly 54'; Tchato (yellow card) 57'; Ndiaye 90+9'	Stadium: Stade Marie-Marvingt; Attendance: 12,147; Referee: (France) Rémi Landry

22 August 2025 3	Le Mans	1-0	Bastia	Le Mans
20:00 CEST	Ribelin (yellow card) 25'; Eyoum (yellow card) 64'; Robin (yellow card) 77'; Yohou (yellow card) 84'; Gueye 90+3' (pen.)	Report	Guidi (yellow card) 64'; Parravicini (yellow card) 88'	Stadium: Stade Marie-Marvingt; Attendance: 8,333; Referee: (France) Thierry Bouille

30 August 2025 4	Reims	1-0	Le Mans	Reims
15:00	Tia 62'	Report	Gueye (yellow card) 42'; Abanda (yellow card) 90'	Stadium: Stade Auguste-Delaune; Attendance: 9,656; Referee: (France) Karim Abed

12 September 2025 5	Le Mans	0-1	Rodez	Le Mans
21:00	Harhouz (yellow card) 18'; Gueye (yellow card) 37'; Lauray (yellow card) 45+1'	Report	Saka (yellow card) 40'; Mendes (yellow card) 45+2'; Arconte 59'	Stadium: Stade Marie-Marvingt; Attendance: 7,349; Referee: (France) Aurélien Petit

19 September 2025 6	USL Dunkerque	2-2	Le Mans	Dunkirk
21:00	Sekongo 17'; Bardeli 56'; Sanganté (red card) 69'; Eguaras (yellow card) 70'	Report	Malang Gomes (yellow card) 22' (yellow-red card) 29'; Calodat 36'; Colas 78'; Ribelin (yellow card) 83'	Stadium: Stade Marcel-Tribut; Attendance: 3,481; Referee: (France) Mikael Lesage

23 September 2025 7	Le Mans	1-0	Grenoble	Le Mans
21:30	Voyer (yellow card) 9' (yellow-red card) 17'; Gueye 45+3'; Quarshie (yellow card) 62'; Rossignol (yellow card) 90+4'	Report	Xantippe (yellow card) 77'; Maurin (yellow card) 85'	Stadium: Stade Marie-Marvingt; Attendance: 8,211; Referee: (France) Azzedine Souifi

26 September 2025 8	Clermont	1-1	Le Mans	Clermont-Ferrand
21:00	Loïc Socka 21'; Guivarch (yellow card) 28'	Report	Rossignol (yellow card) 65'; Buadés (yellow card) 71'; Vercruysse 82'	Stadium: Stade Gabriel-Montpied; Attendance: 3,862; Referee: (France) Brendan Roffet

3 October 2025 9	Le Mans	2-2	Troyes	Le Mans
21:00	Yohou (yellow card) 37'; Harhouz 61'; Calodat 90+2'	Report	Adeline (yellow card) 27'; Gozzi (yellow card) 42'; Lemaître (yellow card) 44'; Bentayeb 73' 75'	Stadium: Stade Marie-Marvingt; Attendance: 6,500; Referee: (France) Stéphanie Frappart

18 October 2025 10	Saint-Étienne	2-3	Le Mans	Saint-Étienne
21:00	Jaber (yellow card) 15'; Tardieu 28' 80' (pen.); Cardona (yellow card) 81'; Larsonneur (yellow card) 90+6'	Report	Rabillard 21'; Lauray (yellow card) 27'; Yohou (yellow card) 32'; Gueye 55' (pen.); Harhouz 68'; Robin (yellow card) 72'; Voyer (yellow card) 81'	Stadium: Stade Geoffroy-Guichard; Attendance: 33,824; Referee: (France) Florent Batta

24 October 2025 11	Le Mans	1-0	Boulogne	Le Mans
21:00	Rossignol (yellow card) 34'; Brice Oggad (yellow card) 76'; Yohou 90+3'	Report	Amine El Farissi (yellow card) 18'; Hervé Touré (yellow card) 90+1'	Stadium: Stade Marie-Marvingt; Attendance: 7,131; Referee: (France) Tifenn Leprodhomme

28 October 2025 12	Laval	1-1	Le Mans	Laval
21:30	Vargas (yellow card) 45+2'; Ilyes Aradj (yellow card) 48'; Layousse Samb 86' (yellow card) 86'	Report	Lauray (yellow card) 21'; Rossignol 26'; Calodat (yellow card) 67'; Colas (yellow card) 90+7'	Stadium: Stade Francis Le Basser; Attendance: 9,412; Referee: (France) Rémi Landry

31 October 2025 13	Le Mans	1-0	Nancy	Le Mans
21:00	Malang Gomes (yellow card) 20'; Lauray (yellow card) 45'; Harhouz 65'; Buadés (yellow card) 75'; Cossier (yellow card) 84'; Kocik (yellow card) 90+2'	Report	Brandon Bokangu (yellow card) 57'; Saint-Ruf (yellow card) 88'	Stadium: Stade Marie-Marvingt; Attendance: 7,102; Referee: (France) Pierre Gaillouste

8 November 2025 14	Le Mans	0-0	Red Star FC	Le Mans
14:00		Report		Stadium: Stade Marie-Marvingt; Attendance: 9,323; Referee: (France) Ahmed Taleb
