= 2025–26 Ligue 2 =

French second division football league

Ligue 2
- Season: 2025–26
- Dates: 9 August 2025 – 8 May 2026
- Champions: Troyes
- Promoted: Troyes; Le Mans
- Relegated: Amiens; Bastia
- Matches: 287
- Goals: 715 (2.49 per match)
- Top goalscorer: Tawfik Bentayeb (18 goals)
- Biggest home win: Saint-Étienne 6–0 Pau (28 October 2025)
- Biggest away win: Guingamp 0–4 Red Star (23 August 2025); Nancy 1–5 Annecy (17 April 2026); Boulogne 2–6 Reims (28 October 2025)
- Highest scoring: Boulogne 2–6 Reims (28 October 2025); Dunkerque 6–2 Amiens (27 September 2025)
- Longest winning run: Saint-Étienne (5 matches)
- Longest unbeaten run: Rodez (18 matches)
- Longest winless run: Laval (12 matches)
- Longest losing run: Boulogne; Clermont (5 matches)
- Highest attendance: 36,588
- Lowest attendance: 434
- Average attendance: 2,154,388

The 2025–26 Ligue 2, commonly known as Ligue 2 BKT for sponsorship reasons, is the 87th season of Ligue 2. The season began on 9 August 2025 and concluded on 8 May 2026.

== Overview ==
=== Promoted and relegation teams (pre-season) ===
FC Lorient and Paris FC were promoted to Ligue 1 after one and seven years in Ligue 2, respectively.

Metz was promoted to Ligue 1 after defeating Reims in the Ligue 1 promotion/relegation play-offs after one year in the second tier. Reims will be relegated to a lower division after a 7-year tenure in the top flight.

Montpellier and Saint-Étienne will return to Ligue 2 after sixteen years and one year being in Ligue 1, respectively.

Nancy, Le Mans and Boulogne will return to Ligue 2 from the Championnat National after three and five and thirteen years absence, respectively, with Boulogne's promotion being back-to-back from the Championnat National 2 two seasons ago.

Caen were relegated to Championnat National after 6 years in the second tier and will play in the 3rd tier for the first time since 1984 and after a 41 year absence.

=== Administratively relegated team ===
Martigues were excluded to Régional 1, the 6th tier of French football, and will play in regional football for the first time in 55 years.

AC Ajaccio were relegated due to financial problems. They will return to the Championnat National after 27 years. On 16 July 2025, the club relegation administratively is confirmed.

Lyon had been administratively relegated to the league from highest tier on 23 June 2025, meaning Reims were due to be kept in the Ligue 1. The decision was later overturned on appeal from Lyon on 9 July, meaning both clubs competitively incurred places remain unchanged.

== Teams ==
=== To Ligue 2 ===
Promoted from National

- Nancy
- Le Mans
- Boulogne

Relegated from Ligue 1

- Montpellier
- Saint-Étienne
- Reims

=== From Ligue 2 ===
Promoted to Ligue 1

- Lorient
- Paris FC
- Metz

Relegated to National

- Caen

Administratively relegated to Régional 2

- Ajaccio

Administratively relegated to Départemental 3

- Martigues

=== Stadiums and locations ===
Locations of teams in the 2025–26 Ligue 2.

Team	Location	Stadium	Capacity	2024–25 season
Amiens	Amiens	Stade de la Licorne	12,097	11th in Ligue 2
Annecy	Annecy	Parc des Sports	15,660	6th in Ligue 2
Bastia	Bastia	Stade Armand Cesari	16,078	8th in Ligue 2
Boulogne^{↑}	Boulogne-sur-Mer	Stade de la Libération	9,534	3rd in National
Clermont	Clermont-Ferrand	Stade Gabriel Montpied	11,980	16th in Ligue 2
Dunkerque	Dunkirk	Stade Marcel Tribut	4,933	4th in Ligue 2
Grenoble	Grenoble	Stade des Alpes	20,068	9th in Ligue 2
Guingamp	Guingamp	Stade de Roudourou	18,378	5th in Ligue 2
Laval	Laval	Stade Francis Le Basser	18,607	7th in Ligue 2
Le Mans^{↑}	Le Mans	Stade Marie-Marvingt	25,000	2nd in National
Montpellier^{↓}	Montpellier	Stade de la Mosson	32,900	18th in Ligue 1
Nancy^{↑}	Nancy	Stade Marcel Picot	20,087	1st in National
Pau	Pau	Nouste Camp	4,031	13th in Ligue 2
Red Star	Paris (Saint-Ouen)	Stade Bauer	10,000	15th in Ligue 2
Reims^{↓}	Reims	Stade Auguste-Delaune	21,029	16th in Ligue 1
Rodez	Rodez	Stade Paul Lignon	5,955	14th in Ligue 2
Saint-Étienne^{↓}	Saint-Étienne	Stade Geoffroy Guichard	41,965	17th in Ligue 1
Troyes	Troyes	Stade de l'Aube	21,684	10th in Ligue 2

^{↓}	Relegated from the Ligue 1
^{↑}	Promoted from the National

=== Personnel and kits ===
Note: Flags indicate national team as has been defined under FIFA eligibility rules. Players and coaches may hold more than one non-FIFA nationality.

Team	Manager	Captain	Kit manufacturer	Main kit sponsor	Other kit sponsor(s)
Amiens	(France national football team) Alain Pochat	(France national football team) Victor Lobry	(Germany) Puma	Intersport	List: Front: Igol Lubrifiants, Gueudet; Back: Igol Lubrifiants; Sleeves: None; Shorts: Amiens Métropole, E.Leclerc Rivery
Annecy	(France national football team) Laurent Guyot	(Algeria national football team) Ahmed Kashi	(Germany) Adidas	MSC Cruises	List: Front: Mediaco Vrac, TeamWork; Back: Stgenergy, Nissan Groupe Maurin; Sleeves: Tissier Technique; Shorts: LP Charpente, Burger King
Bastia	(France national football team) Réginald Ray	(France national football team) Christophe Vincent	(Germany) Adidas	Corsica Ferries	List: Front: Oscaro Power, Capembal, Roncaglia Blanchisserie, Collectivité de Corse, Coviag, Olivier Bleu, Smart Good Things, Casa di e Lingue; Back: Payfoot, ESSE, Madewis; Sleeves: Groupe Actual, Asco6Tem; Shorts: Burger King, Garage Corsa, CORSECARLOC
Boulogne	(France national football team) Fabien Dagneaux	(France national football team) Nathan Zohoré	(Germany) Jako		List: Front: None; Back: None; Sleeves: None; Shorts: None
Clermont	(France national football team) Sébastien Mazeyrat (France national football team) Grégory Proment	(French Guiana national football team) Yoann Salmier	(Italy) Kappa		List: Front: None; Back: None; Sleeves: None; Shorts: None
Dunkerque	(Spain national football team) Albert Sánchez	(Guinea-Bissau national football team) Opa Sanganté	(Denmark) Hummel	Intersport	List: Front: Dunkerque Communauté Urbaine, Topensi; Back: DS Levage; Sleeves: 2024 Vivre les JO #dunkerqueagglo Tous en bleu, blanc, rouge; Shorts: Hauts-de-France, Onet
Grenoble	(France national football team) Frédéric Gueguen	(France national football team) Gaëtan Paquiez	(United States) Nike	List: Home: Vinci Immobilier; Away: Carrefour Market	List: Front: Carrefour^{3}, Vinci Immobilier^{4}, Smart Good Things, Grenoble Alpes Métropole; Back: Chamrousse, Le Cabanon en Provence; Sleeves: None; Shorts: LCR
Guingamp	(France national football team) Sylvain Ripoll	(France national football team) Dylan Louiserre	(Italy) Kappa	Breizh Cola	List: Front: Celtigel, Creactuel, Ballay; Back: Jardiman, Vital Concept; Sleeves: Cafés Coïc; Shorts: Bernard Jarnoux Crêpier, Tibbloc
Laval	(France national football team) Olivier Frapolli	(France national football team) Sam Sanna	(Italy) Kappa	Lactel	List: Front: La Mayenne Le Département, Laval Agglo; Back: V and B Cave & Bar, Groupe Lucas, Mayenne; Sleeves: Groupe Actual; Shorts: Laval Agglo, SEPAL, Aropiz
Le Mans	(France national football team) Patrick Videira	(France national football team) Edwin Quarshie	(Italy) Kappa	Le Mans	List: Front: Groupe EJ, Legrand; Back: E.Leclerc; Sleeves: None; Shorts: None
Montpellier	(France national football team) Zoumana Camara	(Switzerland national football team) Becir Omeragic	(United States) Nike	Swile	List: Front: None; Back: FAUN-Environnement, Montpellier Métropole, Big M Burger; Sleeves: FAUN-Environnement, Kaporal Jeans; Shorts: Loxam, Viwone
Nancy	(Uruguay national football team) Pablo Correa	(Guadeloupe national football team) Nicolas Saint-Ruf	(France) Decathlon	Hyundai	List: Front: None; Back: None; Sleeves: None; Shorts: None
Pau	(France national football team) Thierry Debès	(France national football team) Jean Ruiz	(Spain) Joma	Pau	List: Front: Bullux Services, Casino de Pau, Intersport; Back: Arobase Intérim, Brico Fenêtre, Iroise Bellevie; Sleeves: Bullux Services; Shorts: Übi Care
Red Star	(France national football team) Grégory Poirier	(France national football team) Ryad Hachem	(Italy) Kappa	TRUST'iT	List: Front: None; Back: None; Sleeves: None; Shorts: None
Reims	(Belgium national football team) Karel Geraerts	(Malta national football team) Teddy Teuma	(Germany) Puma	Yasuda	List: Front: None; Back: None; Sleeves: None; Shorts: None
Rodez	(France national football team) Didier Santini	(France national football team) Raphaël Lipinski	(Germany) Adidas	E.Leclerc	List: Front: Maxoutil; Back: JeanStation, Thermatic, Ville de Rodez, Aveyron, Rodez Agglomération, Occitanie; Sleeves: aveyron.fr; Shorts: Intersport, Maxoutil, Andrieu Construction
Saint-Étienne	(France national football team) Philippe Montanier	(France national football team) Gautier Larsonneur	(Denmark) Hummel	Loire	List: Front: Kelyps Intérim, BYmyCAR, Terroir Halles; Back: Siléane; Sleeves: None; Shorts: Kapriol, Desjoyaux
Troyes	(France national football team) Stéphane Dumont	(France national football team) Adrien Monfray	(Germany) Puma	Troyes	List: Front: LCR^{3}, norelem, Festilight; Back: Sinfin, Amplitude Groupe Automobile; Sleeves: Century 21 Groupe Martinot; Shorts: Huguier Frères

1. Interim.
2. Apparel made by club.
3. Applied on home shirt
4. Applied on away shirt
5. Applied on third shirt

=== Managerial changes ===
Team	Outgoing manager	Manner of departure	Date of vacancy	Position in table	Incoming manager	Date of appointment
Reims	(Mali) Samba Diawara	Resigned	18 June 2025	Pre-season	(Belgium) Karel Geraerts	18 June 2025
Clermont	(France) Sébastien Mazeyrat	End of tenure af caretaker	23 June 2025	Pre-season	(France) Sébastien Mazeyrat (France) Grégory Proment	23 June 2025
Dunkerque	(Portugal) Gonçalo Feio	End of contract	30 June 2025	Pre-season	(Spain) Albert Sánchez	1 July 2025
Bastia	(France) Benoît Tavenot	Sacked	30 October 2025	18th	(France) Réginald Ray	15 November 2025
Pau	(France) Nicolas Usaï	Mutual consent	24 January 2026	10th	(France) Thierry Debès	24 January 2026
Saint-Étienne	(Norway) Eirik Horneland	Sacked	31 January 2026	5th	(France) Philippe Montanier	2 February 2026
Amiens	(Senegal) Omar Daf	Sacked	5 March 2026	18th	(France) Alain Pochat	20 March 2026
Grenoble	(France) Franck Rizzetto	Sacked	23 March 2026	13th	(France) Frédéric Gueguen	23 March 2026

== Standings ==
=== League table ===
Pos	Team	Pld	W	D	L	GF	GA	GD	Pts	Promotion or Relegation
1	Troyes (C, P)	34	20	7	7	60	33	+27	67	Promotion to Ligue 1
2	Le Mans (P)	34	16	14	4	50	31	+19	62	Promotion to Ligue 1
3	Saint-Étienne	34	18	6	10	59	38	+21	60	Qualification for promotion play-off semi-final
4	Red Star	34	16	10	8	45	37	+8	58	Qualification for promotion play-off quarter-final
5	Rodez	34	15	13	6	45	39	+6	58	Qualification for promotion play-off quarter-final
6	Reims	34	14	14	6	53	35	+18	56	
7	Annecy	34	15	7	12	49	39	+10	52	
8	Montpellier	34	14	9	11	41	31	+10	51	
9	Pau	34	12	9	13	48	62	−14	45	
10	Dunkerque	34	11	10	13	53	45	+8	43	
11	Guingamp	34	10	10	14	42	49	−7	40	
12	Grenoble	34	8	15	11	33	39	−6	39	
13	Clermont	34	9	10	15	38	44	−6	37	
14	Nancy	34	9	10	15	35	52	−17	37	
15	Boulogne	34	9	9	16	34	49	−15	36	
16	Laval (O)	34	6	14	14	30	48	−18	32	Qualification for relegation play-off
17	Bastia (R)	34	5	13	16	23	39	−16	28	Relegation to Ligue 3
18	Amiens (R)	34	6	6	22	37	65	−28	24	Relegation to Ligue 3

Source: Ligue 2
Rules for classification: 1) Points; 2) Goal difference; 3) Number of goals scored; 4) Head-to-head goal difference; 5) Fair play points
(C) Champions; (O) Play-off winners; (P) Promoted; (R) Relegated

=== Position by round ===
Team ╲ Round	1	2	3	4	5	6	7	8	9	10	11	12	13	14	15	16	17	18	19	20	21	22	23	24	25	26	27	28	29	30	31	32	33	34
Amiens	8	2	7	8	10	5	9	12	13	10	9	12	12	14	15	16	14	15	16	16	16	16	16	16	16	16	16	16	16	17	18	18	18	18
Annecy	18	17	11	14	15	8	11	14	15	12	8	11	10	12	10	10	10	10	9	8	8	9	9	7	6	8	9	9	8	8	8	8	7	7
Bastia	17	15	17	18	18	18	18	18	18	18	18	18	18	18	18	18	18	18	18	18	18	18	18	18	18	18	18	18	18	18	17	17	17	17
Boulogne	3	8	13	16	17	17	16	17	16	15	16	16	16	17	16	14	16	16	15	15	13	14	13	13	14	12	12	12	12	12	12	12	13	15
Clermont	9	11	5	7	11	6	10	10	12	16	13	14	15	11	11	11	13	11	12	12	14	15	15	15	13	14	14	14	14	14	14	14	14	13
Dunkerque	11	9	14	9	12	14	15	11	10	13	11	8	7	8	9	7	6	6	4	6	6	6	6	6	7	7	8	8	9	10	10	10	10	10
Grenoble	16	14	16	17	13	16	17	16	14	14	15	15	14	10	12	13	11	13	13	13	12	12	12	12	12	13	13	13	13	13	13	13	12	12
Guingamp	5	13	18	15	9	13	8	6	6	6	10	10	9	9	7	9	9	8	7	7	7	8	10	10	10	10	10	10	10	11	11	11	11	11
Laval	7	10	12	12	8	12	14	15	17	17	17	17	17	16	14	17	17	17	17	17	17	17	17	17	17	17	17	17	17	16	16	16	16	16
Le Mans	6	12	8	13	16	15	12	13	11	8	7	7	6	7	5	5	4	5	6	4	3	3	5	5	5	3	3	3	3	3	3	2	2	2
Montpellier	12	4	9	10	14	7	13	7	9	7	5	6	5	4	6	8	8	9	10	9	9	10	7	9	9	9	7	7	7	7	7	7	8	8
Nancy	15	7	3	3	5	10	6	8	7	11	14	13	13	15	17	15	15	14	14	14	15	13	14	14	15	15	15	15	15	15	15	15	15	14
Pau	1	3	2	2	4	4	3	3	3	2	3	4	4	5	8	6	7	7	8	10	10	7	8	11	11	11	11	11	11	9	9	9	9	9
Red Star	13	16	6	4	2	2	4	4	4	4	2	3	2	2	3	3	2	3	2	2	4	5	4	4	4	5	4	4	4	4	5	4	4	4
Reims	10	5	10	5	6	9	5	5	5	5	6	5	8	6	4	3	5	2	5	3	2	2	2	3	3	4	5	5	5	5	4	5	6	6
Rodez	14	18	15	11	7	11	7	9	8	9	12	9	11	13	13	12	12	12	11	11	11	11	11	8	8	6	6	6	6	6	6	6	5	5
Saint-Étienne	4	1	1	1	1	1	1	2	2	3	4	2	3	3	2	2	3	4	3	5	5	4	3	2	2	2	2	2	2	2	2	3	3	3
Troyes	2	6	4	6	3	3	2	1	1	1	1	1	1	1	1	1	1	1	1	1	1	1	1	1	1	1	1	1	1	1	1	1	1	1

Promotion to the Ligue 1
Qualification for the Promotion play-off semi-final
Qualification for the Promotion play-off quarter-final
Qualification for the Relegation play-off
Relegation to the Ligue 3

Source: Ligue 2

== Results ==
=== Fixture and results ===
Home \ Away	AMI	ANN	BAS	BOU	CLE	DUN	GRE	GUI	LAV	LMA	MON	NAN	PAU	RED	REI	ROD	STE	TRO
Amiens		0–1	0–0	0–1	4–3	1–4	2–3	1–2	0–0	3–4	0–2	1–2	0–1	1–3	2–2	2–1	0–1	0–2
Annecy	2–0		1–0	1–1	2–1	2–2	1–1	1–0	0–0	1–2	0–0	1–2	5–1	2–1	1–1	1–2	4–0	1–2
Bastia	1–1	0–2		0–1	1–0	0–0	1–0	1–3	0–2	0–2 (Note: Match abandoned in second half stoppage time with the score at 0–2 after Bastia supporters threw smoke bombs onto the pitch. A few days later, the LFP decided to uphold the score.)	0–2	0–0	1–1	0–3 (Note: Match abandoned at the 57th minute with the score at 0–0 after a flare thrown by a Bastia fan hit a Red Star player. Match was later forfeited to Red Star. Goals for and against were not added to the league table.)	1–3	2–3	2–0	0–0
Boulogne	4–2	1–2	1–0		0–2	2–6	3–1	2–2	1–2	0–0	1–0	0–0	0–3	1–2	2–6	1–2	0–1	1–2
Clermont	2–1	0–1	1–1	1–1		2–1	2–1	1–0	4–1	1–1	1–1	2–2	0–1	0–1	0–1	1–2	1–2	0–0
Dunkerque	6–2	0–1	1–1	1–1	2–2		0–1	0–0	0–2	2–2	0–1	1–3	3–1	3–0	1–1	1–1	1–0	2–0
Grenoble	2–1	1–3	0–0	0–0	2–2	1–0		0–0	1–1	1–1	1–1	1–0	1–1	0–3	0–0	2–1	0–0	1–0
Guingamp	1–0	0–3	0–1	3–0	0–1	2–1	1–1		2–0	3–3	1–0	2–2	2–2	0–4	0–2	0–0	1–2	1–0
Laval	0–3	2–2	0–2	2–1	0–0	1–2	3–2	2–2		1–1	0–1	1–1	0–1	0–1	2–2	0–0	3–3	0–1
Le Mans	1–0	3–0	1–0	1–0	1–0	1–0	1–0	1–1	1–1		1–2	1–0	4–0	0–0	1–1	0–1	0–0	2–2
Montpellier	1–1	1–0	2–0	1–3	1–2	1–3	2–1	3–1	2–0	4–2		4–1	0–1	1–1	0–0	2–0	0–2	2–2
Nancy	0–1	1–5	2–0	1–0	1–0	3–2	0–0	0–3	0–2	2–4	0–3		2–2	0–1	0–1	1–3	1–1	2–1
Pau	1–2	2–0	2–2	1–2	3–1	0–3	2–2	2–1	1–0	1–2	0–0	1–3		0–3	2–0	3–3	0–3	1–1
Red Star	1–3	1–0	4–3	2–2	2–2	1–0	1–0	3–2	0–0	0–0	1–1	2–1	0–3		0–0	1–1	2–1	1–3
Reims	0–0	2–1	0–0	0–0	4–1	1–2	2–4	1–0	4–0	1–0	2–0	1–1	5–3	3–2		1–2	1–0	0–0
Rodez	3–2	2–1	1–1	1–0	0–1	1–1	1–0	2–1	1–1	1–1	1–0	0–0	1–2	1–1	2–2		2–1	2–1
Saint-Étienne	5–0	4–0	2–2	0–1	1–0	2–1	1–1	2–3	2–1	2–3	1–0	2–1	6–0	2–0	3–2	4–0		0–3
Troyes	3–1	3–1	1–0	1–0	2–1	5–1	2–1	5–2	4–0	0–2	1–0	3–0	4–3	1–0	2–1	1–1	2–3	

Source: Ligue 2
Legend: Blue = home team win; Yellow = draw; Red = away team win.
For upcoming matches, an "a" indicates there is an article about the rivalry between the two participants.

=== Results by round ===
Team ╲ Round	1	2	3	4	5	6	7	8	9	10	11	12	13	14	15	16	17	18	19	20	21	22	23	24	25	26	27	28	29	30	31	32	33	34
Amiens	D	W	L	D	D	W	L	L	L	W	W	L	L	L	L	L	W	L	L	D	L	W	L	D	L	L	L	L	D	L	L	L	L	L
Annecy	L	D	W	L	D	W	L	L	D	W	W	L	D	L	W	W	L	L	W	W	W	D	D	W	W	L	L	L	W	D	W	W	W	L
Bastia	L	D	L	L	D	L	L	D	D	L	L	L	W	L	L	L	D	W	W	L	D	D	D	D	L	D	L	D	D	L	W	D	W	L
Boulogne	W	L	L	L	L	L	W	L	W	D	L	L	D	D	W	D	L	L	W	D	W	L	W	L	D	W	W	D	D	D	L	L	L	L
Clermont	D	D	W	D	L	W	L	D	L	L	W	D	L	W	D	D	L	W	L	L	L	L	L	W	W	L	L	L	D	D	L	D	W	W
Dunkerque	D	D	L	W	L	D	L	W	D	L	W	W	W	D	D	W	W	W	W	L	L	D	W	D	L	D	L	L	D	L	L	W	L	L
Grenoble	L	D	L	D	W	L	L	D	W	D	L	D	W	W	L	W	D	L	L	D	W	D	D	D	D	L	D	L	D	D	L	D	W	W
Guingamp	D	L	L	W	W	L	W	W	D	D	L	D	W	D	W	L	L	W	W	W	L	D	L	D	D	D	W	L	L	D	L	L	L	L
Laval	D	D	D	D	W	L	L	L	D	L	W	D	L	W	L	L	L	L	L	D	L	D	D	L	D	D	L	W	D	D	W	D	L	W
Le Mans	D	L	W	L	L	D	W	D	D	W	W	D	W	D	W	W	W	D	D	W	W	D	L	D	D	W	W	W	W	D	W	D	D	W
Montpellier	D	W	L	D	L	W	L	W	L	W	W	D	W	W	L	L	D	L	L	W	W	L	W	L	D	W	W	D	D	D	W	W	L	D
Nancy	D	W	W	D	L	L	W	L	D	L	D	W	L	L	L	L	W	W	L	L	D	W	L	D	D	L	L	D	D	D	L	D	W	W
Pau	W	D	W	D	L	W	W	W	W	D	L	L	D	D	L	W	L	D	L	D	W	W	L	L	L	D	W	D	L	W	W	L	L	L
Red Star	D	L	W	W	W	W	L	W	D	W	W	L	W	D	D	W	D	L	W	D	D	L	W	L	D	L	W	W	D	W	L	W	W	D
Reims	D	W	L	W	D	L	W	W	L	D	D	W	L	W	W	W	D	W	L	W	W	D	D	D	D	D	L	W	D	D	W	D	D	W
Rodez	D	L	D	W	W	L	W	L	D	D	D	W	L	L	D	D	W	D	D	W	D	W	W	W	D	W	W	D	D	W	W	D	W	W
Saint-Étienne	D	W	W	D	W	W	W	L	W	L	D	W	L	W	W	L	D	D	W	L	L	W	W	W	W	W	D	W	D	W	L	L	L	W
Troyes	W	D	W	L	W	W	W	W	D	W	D	W	D	L	W	D	W	W	W	L	L	L	D	W	W	W	W	W	D	L	W	W	W	L

Source: Ligue 2

=== Rescheduled matches ===
Round	Home team	Away team	Original Date	New Date	Reason
1	Boulogne	Bastia	9 August 2025	16 September 2025	Match was rescheduled due to uncertainty regarding AC Ajaccio's professional licence, which was stripped before the start of the season and automatically promoted Boulogne.
11	Bastia	Laval	24 October 2025	25 November 2025	Match was postponed after Stade Lavallois was not able to travel to Corsica due to heavy winds.

== Promotion & relegation play-off ==
=== Promotion play-offs ===
A promotion play-off competition was held at the end of the season, involving the 3rd, 4th and 5th-placed teams in 2025–26 Ligue 2, and the 16th-placed team in Ligue 1.

==== Bracket ====
Quarter-final
4B	Red Star	2
5B	Rodez	3

Semi-final
3B	Saint-Étienne (p)	0 (7)
5B	Rodez	0 (6)

Final
3B	Saint-Étienne	0	1	1
16A	Nice	0	4	4

==== Matches ====
Quarter-final

12 May 2026	Red Star	2−3	Rodez	Saint-Ouen-sur-Seine
20:30 UTC+1	Cabral 14'; Escartin 61'		Baldé 29'; Magnin 67'; Younoussa 69'	Stadium: Stade Bauer

Semi-final

15 May 2026	Saint-Étienne	0−0 (7−6 p)	Rodez	Saint-Étienne
20:30 UTC+1				Stadium: Stade Geoffroy-Guichard
	Penalties
	Davitashvili (penalty scored); Stassin (penalty scored); Old (penalty missed); Ferreira (penalty scored); Moueffek (penalty missed); N'Guessan (penalty scored); Kanté (penalty scored); Bernauer (penalty scored); Maubleu (penalty missed); Nadé (penalty scored)		(penalty missed) Magnin; (penalty missed) Lipinski; (penalty scored) Evans; (penalty scored) Saka; (penalty scored) Arconte; (penalty scored) Nagera; (penalty scored) Benchama; (penalty scored) Joly; (penalty missed) Galves; (penalty missed) Laurent

Final

26 May 2026	Saint-Étienne	0–0	Nice	Saint-Étienne
20:45 UTC+1		Report		Stadium: Stade Geoffroy-Guichard; Attendance: 39,772; Referee: Benoît Bastien

29 May 2026	Nice	4–1 (4–1 agg.)	Saint-Étienne	Nice
20:45 UTC+1	Clauss 62'; Boudache 81'; Wahi 87', 90+2'	Report	Davitashvili 79' (pen.)	Stadium: Allianz Riviera; Attendance: 0 (Behind closed doors); Referee: Ruddy Buquet

Nice won 4–1 on aggregate and therefore both clubs remain in their respective leagues.

=== Relegation play-offs ===
The 16th-placed teams of the Ligue 2 faces the 3rd-placed team of the National.

==== Summary ====
Team 1	Agg.	Team 2	1st leg	2nd leg
Laval	2−1	Rouen	1−1	1−0

==== Matches ====
First leg

19 May 2026	Rouen	1−1	Laval	Le Petit-Quevilly
20:30 UTC+1	Fuss 48' (pen.)		Mandouki 18'	Stadium: Stade Robert Diochon

Second leg

24 May 2026	Laval	1−0	Rouen	Laval
17:00 UTC+1	Sellouki 25'		Rocha (red card) 11'	Stadium: Stade Francis Le Basser

Laval won 2–1 on aggregate and therefore both clubs remain in their respective leagues.

== Season statistics ==
=== Top goalscorers ===
Rank	Player	Club	Goals
1	(Morocco) Tawfik Bentayeb	Troyes	18
2	(Central African Republic) Louis Mafouta	Guingamp	15
2	(France) Thomas Robinet	Dunkerque	15
4	(Guadeloupe) Taïryk Arconte	Rodez	14
4	(Georgia (country)) Zuriko Davitashvili	Saint-Étienne	14
4	(Japan) Keito Nakamura	Reims	14
7	(France) Damien Durand	Red Star	13
8	(France) Ibrahima Baldé	Rodez	12
8	(Guinea-Bissau) Alexandre Mendy	Montpellier	12
10	(Belgium) Lucas Stassin	Saint-Étienne	11

=== Clean sheets ===
Rank	Player	Club	Clean sheets
1	(France) Ewen Jaouen	Reims	15
2	(France) Nicolas Kocik	Le Mans	13
2	(France) Gaëtan Poussin	Red Star	13
4	(Cameroon) Simon Ngapandouetnbu	Montpellier	12
5	(France) Gautier Larsonneur	Saint-Étienne	10
6	(France) Florian Escales	Annecy	9
7	(Haiti) Johny Placide	Bastia	8
7	(Mali) Mamadou Samassa	Laval	8
9	(France) Enzo Basilio	Nancy	7
9	(France) Quentin Braat	Rodez	7
9	(Mauritania) Mamadou Diop	Grenoble	7
9	(Burkina Faso) Hillel Konaté	Troyes	7

== Attendances ==
=== Overall ===
Ligue 2 clubs listed by average home league attendance in the 2025–26 season:

Pos	Club	Average attendance
1	AS Saint-Étienne	31,305
2	Le Mans FC	12,033
3	Stade de Reims	10,877
4	SC Bastia	9,178
5	MHSC	8,768
6	EA Guingamp	8,152
7	AS Nancy	8,084
8	ESTAC	7,969
9	Amiens SC	7,263
10	Stade Lavallois	6,430
11	Rodez AF	5,892
12	FC Annecy	5,108
13	Clermont Foot	4,826
14	Red Star	4,563
15	US Boulogne	4,247
16	Grenoble Foot	4,113
17	USL Dunkerque	3,876
18	Pau FC	3,241

=== Home match played ===
As of future

Team \ Match played	1	2	3	4	5	6	7	8	9	10	11	12	13	14	15	16	17	Total
Amiens																		
Annecy																		
Bastia																		
Boulogne																		
Clermont																		
Dunkerque																		
Grenoble																		
Guingamp																		
Laval																		
Le Mans																		
Montpellier																		
Nancy																		
Pau																		
Red Star																		
Reims																		
Rodez																		
Saint-Étienne																		
Troyes																		
League total																		0

Source: Ligue 2

== See also ==
- 2025–26 Ligue 1
- 2025–26 Championnat National
- 2025–26 Championnat National 2
- 2025–26 Championnat National 3
- 2025–26 Coupe de France
