= William Harhouz =

French footballer

Personal information
- Full name: William Quentin Harhouz
- Date of birth: 30 December 1999 (age 26)
- Place of birth: Paris, France
- Height: 1.91 m (6 ft 3 in)
- Position: Forward

Team information
- Current team: Le Mans
- Number: 20

Youth career
- US Ivry
- 2018–2020: Red Star FC

Senior career*
Years	Team	Apps	(Gls)
2020–2022	Red Star FC B		
2022–2023	FC 93	6	(0)
2023–2025	Lusitanos Saint-Maur	38	(13)
2025–	Le Mans	23	(4)
2026–	Le Mans B	1	(0)
- * Club domestic league appearances and goals as of 19:23, 25 September 2026 (UTC)

William Quentin Harhouz (born 30 December 1999) is a French professional footballer who plays as a forward for Le Mans in Ligue 1. He spent his early career in the lower leagues, signing his first professional contract at age 25 with Le Mans after winning the Championnat National 3 with Lusitanos Saint-Maur in 2024–25.

== Career ==
=== Early career ===
Born in Paris, Harhouz began playing for US Ivry, before joining the under-19 team of Red Star FC in 2018, and being promoted to their reserve team two years later. In 2022–23, he moved to FC 93 in the fourth-tier Championnat National 2, playing only six games.

=== Lusitanos Saint-Maur ===
Harhouz then dropped into the fifth-tier Championnat National 3 to play for US Lusitanos Saint-Maur. After two seasons of scoring regularly, his team were promoted in 2025. He was tracked by clubs from the Championnat National, as well as Ligue 2's Le Mans FC whose manager Patrick Videira was a regular viewer of Lusitanos.

In 2025, once the National 3 season had concluded, Harhouz took part in the Kings League for the team Foot2Rue, owned by streamer AmineMaTue and former international players Samir Nasri and Jérémy Ménez. He scored three goals in four games in a run to the last 16 of the competition's World Cup.

=== Le Mans ===
Le Mans initially cooled their interest in Harhouz, due to not considering the Kings League to be serious. However, following two weeks on trial in July 2025, they signed him on a one-year professional deal with the option of a second.

On 9 August 2025, Harhouz made his professional debut as the Ligue 2 season began with a 3–3 draw away to En Avant Guingamp. He came on as a 78th-minute substitute for Antoine Rabillard and scored the equaliser in the 11th minute of added time, receiving a yellow card for taking off his shirt in celebration. He committed a foul soon afterwards and was sent off, nonetheless reflecting positively on his experience.
