= Patrick Vieira (disambiguation) =

Patrick Vieira (born 1976), is a French football manager and former midfielder

Patrick Vieira may also refer to:

- Patrick Vieira (footballer, born 1991), Brazilian football fullback
- Patrick Vieira (footballer, born 1992), Brazilian football attacking midfielder

== See also ==
- Patrick Videira (born 1977), French football manager and former midfielder
