= Eyoum =

Eyoum is a Cameroonian surname. Notable people with the surname include:

- Charles Léa Eyoum (born 1951), Cameroonian footballer
- Théo Eyoum (born 2002), French footballer
