= Harold Voyer =

Martinique international footballer (born 1997)

Personal information
- Date of birth: 26 March 1997 (age 29)
- Place of birth: Saint-Germain-en-Laye, France
- Height: 1.82 m (6 ft 0 in)
- Position: Centre-back

Team information
- Current team: Le Mans
- Number: 5

Youth career
- 2004–2016: Paris Saint-Germain

Senior career*
Years	Team	Apps	(Gls)
2017	Paris Saint-Germain B	7	(0)
2017–2019	Poissy	49	(0)
2019–2020	Lens B	14	(0)
2020–2022	Avranches	50	(0)
2021	Avranches B	2	(0)
2022–	Le Mans	99	(3)
2022	Le Mans B	1	(0)

International career^{‡}
2013	France U16	2	(0)
2017	France U19	1	(0)
2024–	Martinique	1	(0)
- * Club domestic league appearances and goals as of 19:16, 25 September 2026 (UTC) ‡ National team caps and goals as of 20:04, 20 September 2025 (UTC)

Harold Voyer (born 26 March 1997) is a footballer who plays as a centre-back for Ligue 1 club Le Mans. Born in metropolitan France, he represents Martinique at international level.

== Club career ==
Born in Saint-Germain-en-Laye, Voyer spent his entire youth career from ages 7 to 20 at nearby Paris Saint-Germain. He played with the reserve team and trained on occasions with the first team, but never played a first-team game or signed a professional contract.

Upon leaving PSG in 2017, Voyer signed for Poissy. He joined Lens two years later, but was again only a reserve. After two years at Avranches, he joined Le Mans in June 2022, also in the third-tier Championnat National. Aged 25, he signed his first professional contract. Le Mans came runners-up in the 2024–25 Championnat National and won promotion to Ligue 2, with Voyer receiving a new contract as a result. He played 26 games as they won a second consecutive promotion in 2025–26, and scored in a 2–0 win away to eventual champions Troyes on 31 January 2026. He missed the first game of the Ligue 1 season in 2026–27, having received his fifth yellow card of the previous campaign in the last game.

== International career ==
Voyer played two friendly matches for the France under-16 team in March 2013, and one for France under-19 against Haiti on 22 July 2017.

One of Voyer's grandfathers was born in Fort-de-France on the island of Martinique, and Voyer chose to represent the Martinique national football team. In October 2024, he was called up for a match against fellow French overseas region Guadeloupe. He made his debut on 11 October in a 1–0 away win in the CONCACAF Nations League, leaving injured after 25 minutes.
