= Rossignol =

Rossignol is a French word meaning nightingale, and may refer to:

== People ==
- Rossignols, a family of French cryptographers
- André Rossignol (fl. 1923–1928), French racing driver
- Bruno Rossignol (born 1958), French choral conductor and composer
- Dan Rossignol (fl. 2013), doctor and autism researcher
- Felix Rossignol (1920–1981), Canadian NHL ice hockey player
- Jean Antoine Rossignol (1759–1802), general of the French Revolutionary Wars
- Jim Rossignol (born July 1978), British computer games journalist, critic and other
- Jules Rossignol (fl. 1900), French fencer
- Laurence Rossignol (born 1957), French politician
- Martin Rossignol (born 2002), French footballer
- Michelle Rossignol (1940–2020), Canadian film actress
- Philippe Lando Rossignol (fl. 1956–1957), soukous recording artist

== Places ==
- Lake Rossignol, a lake in south-western Nova Scotia, Canada
- Rossignol Wood, a forest north of Hebuterne, France

== Other uses ==
- Rossignol ENT, an experimental automatic rifle
- Battle of Rossignol, a World War I battle near Tintigny, Belgium
- Le rossignol, an 1842 composition by Franz Liszt
- Le Rossignol, a 1914 opera by Igor Stravinsky
- Skis Rossignol, a French manufacturer of clothing and sports equipment

== See also ==
- Rosignol, a village in Guyana
- Rossignola, a red Italian wine grape variety
