= 2024–25 LB Châteauroux season =

LB Châteauroux
2024–25 season
- Manager: Cris (from 28 October)
- Stadium: Stade Gaston-Petit
- Championnat National: 17th
- Top goalscorer: League: Mamadou Diallo (6); All: Mamadou Diallo (6)
- Biggest win: Châteauroux 2–0 Bourg-Péronnas
- Biggest defeat: Châteauroux 2–7 Aubagne

The 2024–25 season is the 109th season in the history of LB Châteauroux and the fourth consecutive season in the Championnat National. The club was excluded from participating in the Coupe de France.

== Pre-season and friendlies ==
| 23 July 2024 Friendly | Saint-Pryvé Saint-Hilaire (France) | 0–0 | (France) Châteauroux |
| 18:30 UTC+2 |

| 27 July 2024 Friendly | Châteauroux (France) | 0–1 | (France) Troyes |
| 17:00 UTC+2 |

| 31 July 2024 Friendly | Bourges Foot 18 (France) | 1–1 | (France) Châteauroux |
| 17:00 UTC+2 |

| 6 August 2024 Friendly | Stade Poitevin (France) | 0–2 | (France) Châteauroux |
| 18:30 UTC+2 |

| 9 August 2024 Friendly | Châteauroux (France) | 1–0 | (Algeria) MC Alger |
| 19:45 UTC+2 |

== Competitions ==
=== Overall record ===
| Competition | First match | Last match | Starting round | Record | | | | | | | |
| Competition | First match | Last match | Starting round | Pld | W | D | L | GF | GA | GD | Win % |
|---|---|---|---|---|---|---|---|---|---|---|---|
| Championnat National | 16 August 2024 | 16 May 2025 | Matchday 1 | 14 | 2 | 3 | 9 | 16 | 32 | −16 | 14.29 |
| Total | | | | 14 | 2 | 3 | 9 | 16 | 32 | −16 | 14.29 |

Last updated: 13 December 2024
Source: Competitions

=== Championnat National ===
==== League table ====
| Pos | Team | Pld | W | D | L | GF | GA | GD | Pts | Promotion or relegation |
|---|---|---|---|---|---|---|---|---|---|---|
| 13 | Versailles | 32 | 8 | 12 | 12 | 41 | 44 | −3 | 36 | |
| 14 | Paris 13 Atletico | 32 | 7 | 14 | 11 | 32 | 38 | −6 | 35 | |
| 15 | Villefranche | 32 | 7 | 13 | 12 | 29 | 37 | −8 | 34 | |
| 16 | Châteauroux | 32 | 8 | 9 | 15 | 40 | 62 | −22 | 33 | Spared from relegation (Note: Châteauroux were spared from relegation after Martigues were administratively relegated from Ligue 2.) |
| 17 | Nîmes (R) | 32 | 6 | 10 | 16 | 24 | 41 | −17 | 28 | Relegation to Championnat National 2 |

Source: soccerway
Rules for classification: 1) head-to-head results; 2) head-to-head goal difference; 3) goal difference; 4) goals scored; 5) fair play points
(R) Relegated

==== Results summary ====
| Overall | | | | | | | | Home | | | | | | Away | | | | | |
| Pld | W | D | L | GF | GA | GD | Pts | W | D | L | GF | GA | GD | W | D | L | GF | GA | GD |
|---|---|---|---|---|---|---|---|---|---|---|---|---|---|---|---|---|---|---|---|
| 14 | 2 | 3 | 9 | 16 | 32 | −16 | 9 | 2 | 1 | 4 | 10 | 16 | −6 | 0 | 2 | 5 | 6 | 16 | −10 |

Last updated: 13 December 2024.
Source: Worldfootball

==== Results by round ====
| Round | 1 | 2 | 3 | 4 | 5 | 6 | 7 | 8 | 9 | 10 | 11 | 12 | 13 | 14 | 15 |
|---|---|---|---|---|---|---|---|---|---|---|---|---|---|---|---|
| Ground | H | A | H | A | H | A | | A | H | A | H | A | H | A | H |
| Result | L | L | W | L | W | L | B | L | L | L | D | D | L | D | L |
| Position | 12 | 17 | 11 | 13 | 7 | 13 | 15 | 16 | 17 | 17 | 17 | 17 | 17 | 17 | 17 |

Updated to match(es) played on 13 December 2024. Source: Worldfootball
A = Away; H = Home; W = Win; D = Draw; L = Loss

==== Matches ====
The league schedule was released on 17 June 2024.

| 16 August 2024 1 | Châteauroux | 0–1 | Boulogne |
| 19:30 UTC+2 |

| 23 August 2024 2 | Nîmes | 1–0 | Châteauroux |

| 30 August 2024 3 | Châteauroux | 2–0 | Bourg-Péronnas |

| 6 September 2024 4 | Valenciennes | 3–1 | Châteauroux |

| 13 September 2024 5 | Châteauroux | 4–3 | Quevilly-Rouen |

| 20 September 2024 6 | Rouen | 4–0 | Châteauroux |

| 7 | Bye |

| 4 October 2024 8 | Concarneau | 3–1 | Châteauroux |

| 18 October 2024 9 | Châteauroux | 1–2 | Le Mans |

| 23 October 2024 10 | Versailles | 1–0 | Châteauroux |

| 1 November 2024 11 | Châteauroux | 1–1 | Paris 13 Atletico |

| 8 November 2024 12 | Villefranche | 2–2 | Châteauroux |

| 22 November 2024 13 | Châteauroux | 0–2 | Nancy |

| 6 December 2024 14 | Sochaux | 2–2 | Châteauroux |

| 13 December 2024 15 | Châteauroux | 2–7 | Aubagne |
