= SS Monopoli 1966 =

Italian football club

Monopoli 1966
- Full name: Società Sportiva Monopoli 1966
- Nicknames: Il Gabbiano (The Seagull); I Biancoverdi (The White and Greens)
- Founded: 1966; 60 years ago
- Ground: Stadio Vito Simone Veneziani, Monopoli, Italy
- Capacity: 6,880
- Chairman: Francesco Rossiello
- Manager: Alberto Colombo
- League: Serie C Group C
- 2025–26: Serie C Group C, 7th of 20
- Website: http://www.monopolicalcio.it/1966/
Home colours	Away colours

Società Sportiva Monopoli 1966 is an Italian association football club located in Monopoli, Apulia. They currently play in Serie C, the third tier of Italian football.

== Predecessor ==
=== A.C. Monopoli ===
The origins of football in Monopoli go back to 1958 when was founded A.C. Monopoli. After winning Eccellenza Apulia in the 2004–05 season (Note: with a claimed world record of 102 points, surpassed only in 2008 by Championnat de France amateur semi-professional team Croix-de-Savoie – now named Evian Thonon Gaillard F.C. – that scored 108 points) it has played in Serie D/H for the 2005–06 season obtaining the promotion to Serie C2 (Note: defeating Celano in the playoff finals after the second place in the league) where it played the 4 seasons following. The team did not enter Lega Pro Seconda Divisione in June 2010 and restarted from Terza Categoria, the lowest level of the Italian football.

== History ==
=== A.S. Liberty Monopoli ===
Former Liberty Monopoli logo

A new club was founded in the summer 2010 as A.S. Liberty Monopoli, after the relocation of Eccellenza club A.S.D. Liberty Bari 1909 from Bari to Monopoli.

In the 2011–12 season the team was promoted from Eccellenza Apulia to Serie D.

=== S.S. MonosPolis and S.S. Monopoli 1966 ===
In the summer 2012 the club was renamed S.S. MonosPolis, then in 2014 Società Sportiva Monopoli 1966

In the 2014–15 season won the Coppa Italia Serie D and was the finalist of the nation play off of Serie D; in the summer 2015 it was admitted to Lega Pro for involvement in the sporting fraud of several teams that were, as a consequence, relegated. Since then, Monopoli has played in what is now known as Serie C.

== Colours and badge ==
former logos

Its colours are white and green.

== Current squad ==
As of 1 September 2026

Note: Flags indicate national team as defined under FIFA eligibility rules; some limited exceptions apply. Players may hold more than one non-FIFA nationality.

No.	Pos.	Nation	Player
1	GK	ITA	Mirko Albertazzi
2	DF	ITA	Raffaele Pucino
3	DF	ITA	Emanuele Di Santo
4	DF	ITA	Andrea Di Bari
5	DF	ITA	Antony Angileri
6	DF	ITA	Stefano Piccinini
7	FW	ITA	Andrea Capone
8	MF	ITA	Cristian Battocchio
9	FW	ITA	Gabriele Bernardotto
10	FW	SEN	Maguette Fall
12	GK	ITA	Christian Sibilano
13	DF	ITA	Matteo Colombara
14	DF	ITA	Filippo Tosi (on loan from Cremonese)
15	MF	ITA	Jean Freddi Greco

No.	Pos.	Nation	Player
16	DF	ITA	Bruno Valenti
17	MF	ITA	Simone Calvano
18	MF	LTU	Skirmantas Paukštys
19	MF	ITA	Riccardo Calcagni
20	FW	ITA	Mattia Sardo
21	FW	ITA	Emanuele Scipioni
22	GK	ITA	Michele Tommasi
23	DF	ITA	Cristian Cerretti
24	GK	ITA	Mattia Gagliano
33	DF	ITA	Edoardo Olivieri (on loan from Modena)
60	MF	ITA	Francesco Gioielli
61	MF	ITA	Luca Garritano
72	MF	ITA	Alessandro Cortinovis
91	FW	ITA	Nicolas Parravicini

=== Out on loan ===
Note: Flags indicate national team as defined under FIFA eligibility rules; some limited exceptions apply. Players may hold more than one non-FIFA nationality.

No. / Pos. / Nation / Player; — / DF / NGR / Sulaiman Oyewale (at Sarnese until 30 June 2027)	No. / Pos. / Nation / Player; — / DF / ITA / Adriano Puccio (at Clodiense until 30 June 2027)

== Honors ==
- Coppa Italia Serie D
  - Champions: 2014–15
