= Erwan Colas =

French footballer

Personal information
- Date of birth: April 22, 1997 (age 29)
- Place of birth: Chartres, France
- Height: 1.79 m (5 ft 10 in)
- Position: Winger

Team information
- Current team: Le Mans
- Number: 28

Youth career
- 2010–2018: Chartres Horizon

College career
Years	Team	Apps	(Gls)
2018–2019	Stetson Hatters	62	(17)

Senior career*
Years	Team	Apps	(Gls)
2019–2020	C'Chartres II	15	(6)
2019–2021	C'Chartres	34	(11)
2022–2023	Lorient II	24	(6)
2023	Lorient	0	(0)
2023–	Le Mans	65	(9)
- * Club domestic league appearances and goals as of 17:11, 21 July 2026 (UTC)

Erwan Colas (born 22 April 1997) is a French footballer who plays as a winger for Ligue 1 club Le Mans.

== Club career ==
A youth product of the French club Chartres Horizon, in 2018 Colas moved to the American college team Stetson Hatters. He returned to France with C'Chartres in the Championnat National 3. On 6 July 2022, he joined Lorient's reserves in the Championnat National 2. He made one single appearance with the senior Lorient team as a substitute in a 6–0 Coupe de France win over La Châtaigneraie on 8 January 2023. On 27 July 2023, he transferred to Le Mans in the Championnat National. After 2 consecutive promotions with Le Mans to Ligue 1, he extended his contract with the club for 3 seasons on 22 June 2026.

== Personal life ==
Colas is the son of the football manager and former player Patrice Colas.
