= Nicolas Parravicini =

Italian footballer (born 1997)

Personal information
- Date of birth: 5 August 1997 (age 29)
- Place of birth: Monza, Italy
- Height: 1.94 m (6 ft 4 in)
- Position: Forward

Team information
- Current team: Monopoli
- Number: 91

Youth career
- –2014: Genoa
- 2014–2016: Novara

Senior career*
Years	Team	Apps	(Gls)
2016	Lecco	2	(0)
2017	Caronnese	11	(0)
2017–2018	Fenegrò		
2018–2019	Alcione	18	(4)
2019–2020	Castello		(23)
2020	Cisanese		
2021	Scanzorosciate		
2021–2022	Arcotanese	30	(10)
2022–2023	Lumezzane	29	(8)
2023	Nocerina	15	(3)
2024	NovaRomentin	19	(9)
2024–2025	Sestri Levante	30	(7)
2025–2026	Bastia	6	(0)
2026–	Monopoli	1	(0)
- * Club domestic league appearances and goals as of 29 August 2026

Nicolas Parravicini (born 5 August 1997) is an Italian professional footballer who plays as a forward for Serie C Group C club Monopoli.

== Career ==
During the summer of 2022, Parravicini signed for Italian side Lumezzane, where he made twenty-eight league appearances and scored eight goals. One year later, he signed for Italian side Nocerina, where he made fifteen league appearances and scored three goals before signing for Italian side NovaRomentin in 2024, where he made nineteen league appearances and scored nine goals.

Following his stint there, he signed for Italian side Sestri Levante the same year, where he made thirty league appearances ad scored seven goals. Ahead of the 2025–26 season, he signed for French side Bastia.

== Style of play ==
Parravicini plays as a forward. Italian newspaper Sprint e Sport wrote in 2024 that "his height and physicality make him an ideal asset in the air and for dead-ball situations".

== Personal life ==
Parravicini was born on 5 August 1997. Born in Italy, he has been nicknamed "Ibra" after Sweden international Zlatan Ibrahimović.
