= Nicolas Kocik =

French footballer (born 1998)

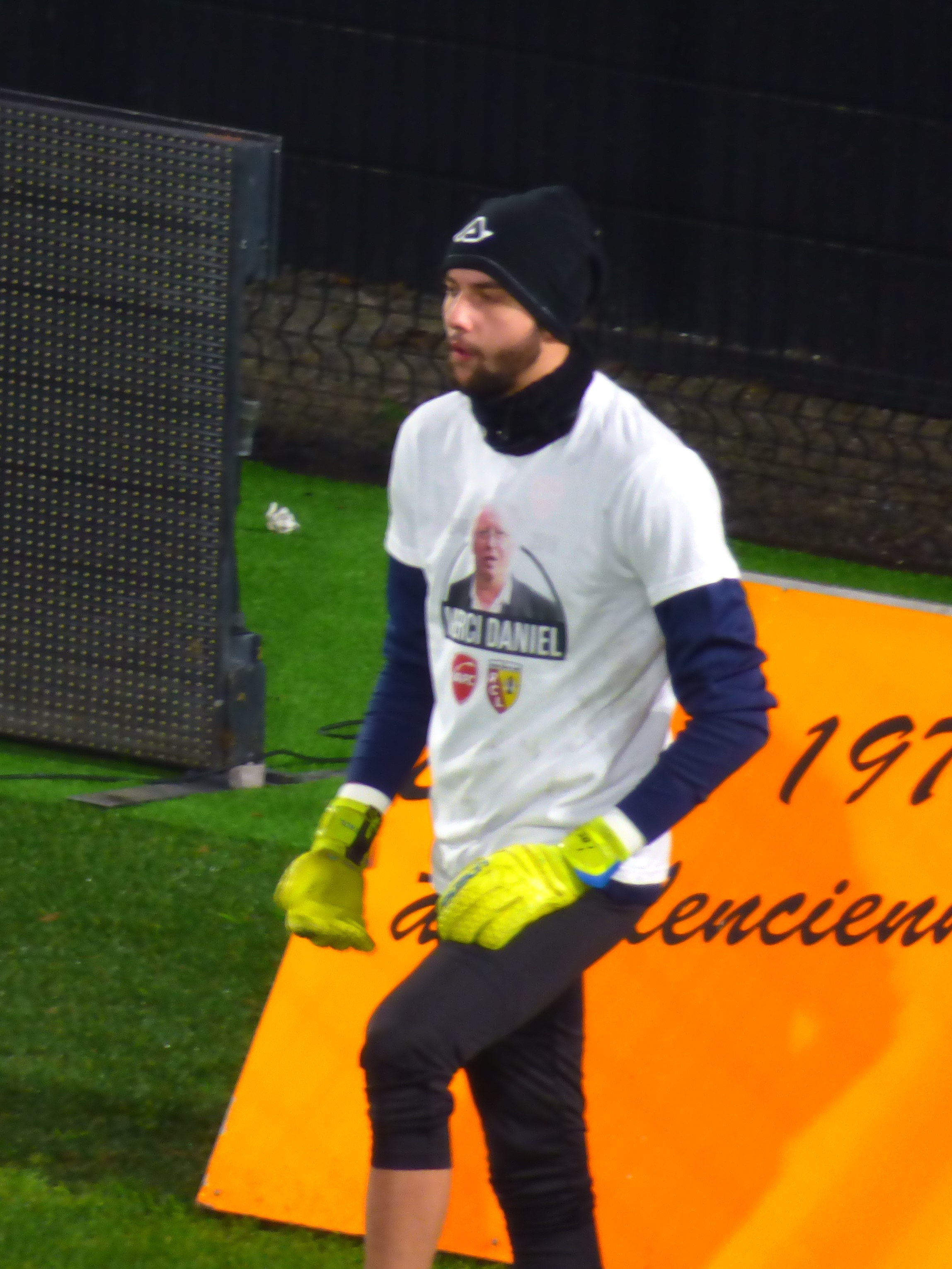
- Kocik in 2019

Personal information
- Date of birth: 4 August 1998 (age 28)
- Place of birth: Maubeuge, France
- Height: 1.93 m (6 ft 4 in)
- Position: Goalkeeper

Team information
- Current team: Le Mans
- Number: 98

Youth career
- 2005–2009: Famars
- 2010–2013: Marly
- 2013–2017: Valenciennes

Senior career*
Years	Team	Apps	(Gls)
2015–2022	Valenciennes II	15	(0)
2018–2019	→ Le Mans II (loan)	8	(0)
2018–2019	→ Le Mans (loan)	5	(0)
2020–2022	Valenciennes	2	(0)
2021–2022	→ Cholet (loan)	26	(0)
2022–	Le Mans	121	(0)

International career
2015	France U17	1	(0)
2017	France U19	2	(0)
- * Club domestic league appearances and goals as of 11 May 2026

Nicolas Kocik (born 4 August 1998) is a French professional footballer who plays as a goalkeeper for Ligue 1 club Le Mans.

== Club career ==
Kocik made his professional debut with Valenciennes in a 4–1 Coupe de la Ligue loss to Ajaccio on 13 August 2019.

On 5 July 2022, Kocik returned to Le Mans.

== Personal life ==
Kocik's grandfather, Bolec Kocik, was also a professional football player and manager of Polish descent.

== Career statistics ==
As of match played 25 April 2026

Appearances and goals by club, season and competition
Club	Season	League			Coupe de France		Coupe de la Ligue		Other		Total	
Club	Season	Division	Apps	Goals	Apps	Goals	Apps	Goals	Apps	Goals	Apps	Goals
Valenciennes II	2015–16	CFA 2	8	0	—		—		—		8	0
Valenciennes II	2019–20	National 3	6	0	—		—		—		6	0
Valenciennes II	2020–21	National 3	1	0	—		—		—		1	0
Valenciennes II	Total		15	0	—		—		—		15	0
Valenciennes	2015–16	Ligue 2	0	0	—		—		—		30	0
Valenciennes	2016–17	Ligue 2	0	0	0	0	0	0	—		0	0
Valenciennes	2017–18	Ligue 2	0	0	0	0	0	0	—		31	0
Valenciennes	2019–20	Ligue 2	2	0	0	0	1	0	—		3	0
Valenciennes	2020–21	Ligue 2	0	0	0	0	—		—		0	0
Valenciennes	Total		2	0	0	0	1	0	—		3	0
Le Mans II (loan)	2018–19	National 3	8	0	3	0	—		—		8	0
Le Mans (loan)	2018–19	National	5	0	—		—		2 (Note: Appearances in Championnat National promotion play-offs)	0	7	0
Cholet (loan)	2021–22	National	26	0	3	0	—		—		29	0
Le Mans	2022–23	National	30	0	0	0	—		—		30	0
Le Mans	2023–24	National	28	0	0	0	—		—		28	0
Le Mans	2024–25	National	31	0	0	0	—		—		31	0
Le Mans	2025–26	Ligue 2	31	0	0	0	—		—		31	0
Le Mans	Total		120	0	0	0	—		—		120	0
Career total			176	0	6	0	1	0	2	0	185	0
