= Ewan Hatfout =

French footballer

Personal information
- Full name: Ewan Hatfout
- Date of birth: April 1, 2000 (age 26)
- Place of birth: Échirolles, France
- Height: 1.80 m (5 ft 11 in)
- Position: Goalkeeper

Team information
- Current team: Le Mans
- Number: 1

Youth career
- Dijon FCO

Senior career*
Years	Team	Apps	(Gls)
2019–2020	Dijon II	6	(0)
2020–2023	Le Mans II	16	(0)
2021–	Le Mans	15	(0)
- * Club domestic league appearances and goals as of 22:13, 20 July 2026 (UTC)

Ewan Hatfout (born 1 April 2000) is a French footballer who plays as a goalkeeper for Ligue 1 club Le Mans.

== Club career ==
Born in Échirolles, Hatfout came through the youth ranks of Dijon FCO, and was promoted to their reserves in the Championnat National 3 during the 2019–20 season. Not retained by Dijon at the end of that season, Hatfout joined Le Mans FC on 19 August 2020 on a free transfer, agreeing a contract for one season in the Championnat National, with an option for a second. On 6 June 2025, he signed another contract as the club earned promotion to Ligue 2. On 25 June 2026, he extended his contract with the club until 2029, as they were again promoted this time to Ligue 1.

== Personal life ==
Born in France, Hatfout is of Algerian descent.
