= Sébastien Mazeyrat =

French footballer (born 1978)

Personal information
- Date of birth: 10 October 1978 (age 48)
- Place of birth: Riom, France
- Height: 1.76 m (5 ft 9 1/2 in)
- Position: Defender

Team information
- Current team: Clermont (assistant manager)

Senior career*
Years	Team	Apps	(Gls)
2000–2003	Clermont		
2003–2006	US Saint-Georges		
2006–2010	Clermont	30	(0)

Managerial career
- 2014–2015: Clermont (U19 assistant)
- 2015–2016: Clermont (U19)
- 2019–2021: Clermont B
- 2021–2023: Clermont (U19)
- 2021–2025: Clermont (academy)
- 2023–2025: Clermont (U17)
- 2025: Clermont (caretaker)
- 2025–2026: Clermont
- 2026–: Clermont
- * Club domestic league appearances and goals

Sébastien Mazeyrat (born 10 October 1978) is a French professional football manager and a former player who played in Ligue 2 for Clermont. He is an assistant manager at Clermont.
