= Jordan Mendes =

Cape Verdean footballer (born 2007)

Personal information
- Full name: Jordan Mendes Correia
- Date of birth: 7 March 2004 (age 22)
- Place of birth: France
- Height: 1.80 m (5 ft 11 in)
- Position: Defensive midfielder

Team information
- Current team: Rodez
- Number: 6

Youth career
- Versailles

Senior career*
Years	Team	Apps	(Gls)
2022–2025	Versailles	48	(3)
2025–	Rodez	30	(0)

International career^{‡}
2026–	Cape Verde	1	(0)
- * Club domestic league appearances and goals as of 11 May 2026 ‡ National team caps and goals as of 20:27, 30 March 2026 (UTC)

Jordan Mendes Correia (Portuguese: [ˈʒɔɾ.dɐn ˈmẽ.dɨʃ ku.ˈʀe.jɐ]; born 4 March 2004) is a professional football player who plays as a defensive midfielder for Ligue 2 club Rodez. Born in France, he plays for the Cape Verde national team.

== Club career ==
A youth product of Versailles, Mendes began his senior career with the club in 2022. On 26 March 2023, he scored a bicycle kick against Chamois Niortais in the Championnat National that was named goal of the season in the division. On 30 June 2025, he transferred to Ligue 2 club Rodez on a contract until 2028.

== International career ==
Born in France, Mendes is of Cape Verdean descent and holds dual French and Cape Verdean descent.He was called up to the Cape Verde national team for a set of friendlies in March 2026. He debuted with Cape Verde in a FIFA Series 1–1 (4–2) penalty shootout win over Finland on 30 March 2026.
