= Noa Boissé =

French footballer

Personal information
- Date of birth: January 20, 2006 (age 20)
- Place of birth: La Flèche, France
- Position: Centre-back

Team information
- Current team: Le Mans
- Number: 15

Youth career
- US Bazouges-Cré
- La Flèche
- Sablé
- 2021–2024: Le Mans

Senior career*
Years	Team	Apps	(Gls)
2024–	Le Mans FC	12	(0)
- * Club domestic league appearances and goals as of 13:58, 21 July 2026 (UTC)

Noa Boissé (born 20 January 2006) is a French footballer who plays as a centre-back for Ligue 1 club Le Mans.

== Club career ==
Boissé is a product of the youth academies of the French clubs US Bazouges-Cré, La Flèche and Sablé, before moving to Le Mans in 2024 where he finished his development. He made his senior and professional debut with Le Mans as a substitute in a 5–0 Coupe de France win over Ambrières-Cigné Football on 12 October 2024. On 23 February 2026, he debuted with Le Mans in a 1–1 Ligue 2 match with Guingamp, and from there made 12 consecutive appearances in the league to close out the season. He was named the "Young Player of the Month" in March 2026. On 4 June 2026, he signed his first professional contract with Le Mans until 2029, as they achieved promotion to Ligue 1.
