= Dame Gueye =

Senegalese footballer (born 1995)

Personal information
- Date of birth: 12 August 1995 (age 31)
- Place of birth: Tivaouane, Senegal
- Height: 1.76 m (5 ft 9 in)
- Positions: Winger; striker

Team information
- Current team: Le Mans
- Number: 25

Senior career*
Years	Team	Apps	(Gls)
–2018	Diambars		
2018	Liepāja	3	(0)
2019	Olympique de Médéa	11	(0)
2019–2020	Loon-Plage		
2020–2021	Saint-Louis Neuweg	7	(5)
2021–2023	RC Grasse	57	(34)
2023–	Le Mans	91	(30)

International career
2016	Senegal	1	(0)
- * Club domestic league appearances and goals as of 11 May 2026

Dame Gueye (born 12 August 1995) is a Senegalese footballer who plays as a winger or striker for Ligue 1 club Le Mans.

== Early life ==
Gueye joined the youth academy of Senegalese side Diambars FC at the age of eleven.

== Career ==
Gueye trialed with French sides Brest and Auxerre. In 2019, he signed for French side Iris Club de Croix, but left due to administrative problems. After that, he signed for French side FC Loon-Plage, where he was regarded as one of the club's most important players. In 2021, he signed for French side RC Grasse, where he was regarded as one of the club's most important players.

== Style of play ==
Gueye initially operated as a winger before switching to striker.

== Personal life ==
Gueye is a native of Tivaouane, Senegal.
