= SWILE =

French app-based company

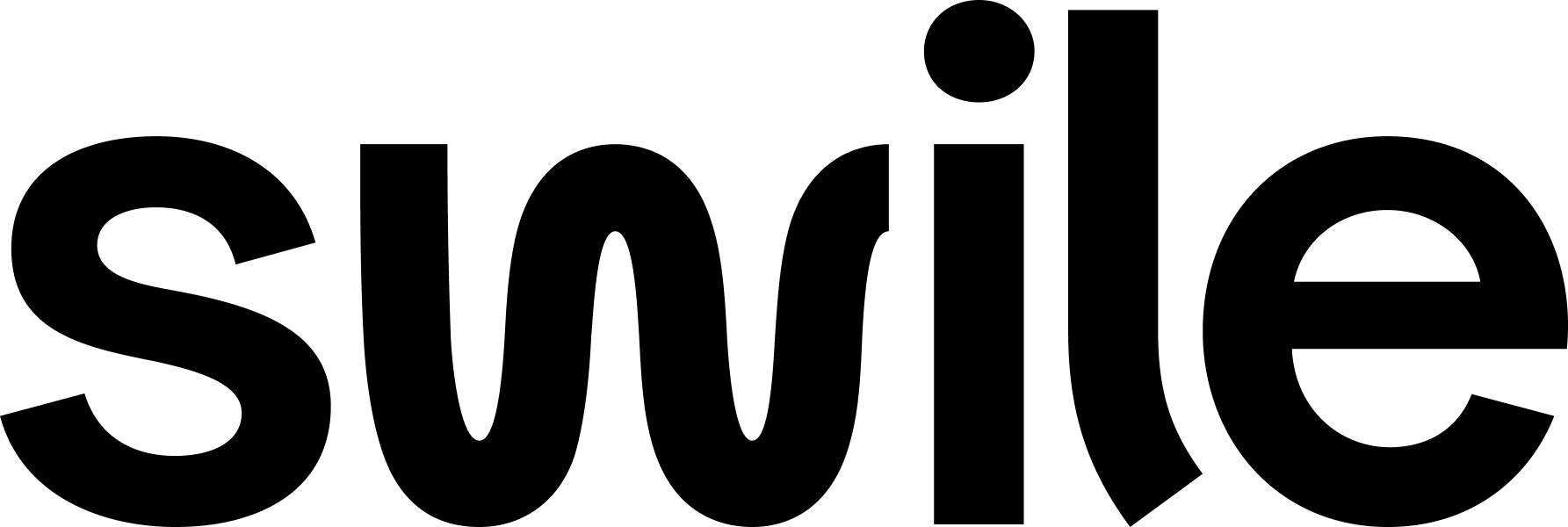
- Formerly: Lunchr
- Type: Joint stock company
- Founded: 2016
- Founder: Loïc Soubeyrand
- Headquarters: Montpellier
- Website: https://www.swile.co/

SWILE (formerly: Lunchr) is a French app-based company that focuses on improving the employee experience. Among others, the platform offers meal vouchers, gift vouchers, mobility vouchers, and business travel solutions.

In March 2020, it was renamed SWILE and entered the lunch break and meal voucher market.

== History ==
The company was founded as Lunchr by Loïc Soubeyrand in 2016. Originally, Lunchr was an app for pre-ordering lunch on the spot or to go.

In January 2017, the company raised €2.5 million in seed funding from Daphni.

In 2018, the company raised €11 million (series A) from Idinvest, followed by another €30 million in February 2019 (series B), notably from Index Ventures and Kima Ventures.

In January 2020, Lunchr became one of the first startups to join the French Tech 120.

A few months later, in March, Lunchr diversified its services, adding team life management tools and changing its brand name to Swile.

In June 2020, the company raised €70 million more in a new round of financing (Series C) from the same investors and the BPI.

In November 2020, Swile acquired Briq, a startup specializing in employee engagement.

In January 2021, Swile won a tender with Carrefour and distributed 62,000 Swile cards to its employees.

In early October 2021, a new $200 million (€175 million) fundraising round, in which Japanese Softbank joined other investors, allowed Swile to capitalize on $1 billion. President Emmanuel Macron cited the company as "a further proof that FrenchTech is at the forefront internationally."

In May 2022, the company acquired the travel management start-up Okarito for €6 million.

== Overview ==
Swile operates in two countries (France and Brazil) and has a total of 1000 employees, 5.5 million users and 85,000 corporate customers, including Carrefour, Le Monde, JCDECAUX, PSG, Airbnb, Spotify, Red Bull, and TikTok in the private sector, as well as numerous local authorities and ministerial references in the public sector.
