= Lucas Calodat =

French footballer (born 2002)

Personal information
- Date of birth: 6 February 2002 (age 24)
- Place of birth: Paris, France
- Height: 1.71 m (5 ft 7 in)
- Position: Left-back

Team information
- Current team: Le Mans
- Number: 22

Youth career
- Sarcelles
- Paris FC
- 2016–2017: Entente SSG
- 2017: Bastia
- 2017–2021: Saint-Étienne

Senior career*
Years	Team	Apps	(Gls)
2019–2023	Saint-Étienne B	36	(5)
2021	Saint-Étienne	1	(0)
2023–2024	Troyes B	11	(0)
2024	GOAL FC	16	(2)
2024–	Le Mans	43	(2)
2025	→ Villefranche (loan)	14	(2)
- * Club domestic league appearances and goals as of 11 May 2026

Lucas Calodat (born 6 February 2002) is a French professional footballer who plays as a left-back for Ligue 1 club Le Mans.

== Career ==
A youth product of Sarcelles, Paris FC, Entente SSG and Bastia, Calodat joined the youth academy of Saint-Étienne in 2017. He made his professional debut with Saint-Étienne in a 3–1 Ligue 1 loss to Paris Saint-Germain on 28 November 2021, coming on as a sub in the 87th minute. In 2023, Calodat left Saint-Étienne.

On 2 February 2025, Calodat signed with Villefranche.

== Personal life ==
Born in France, Calodat is of Guadeloupean descent.
