= HB Chartres =

French football club

- Full name: Horizon de Beaulieu Chartres
- Dissolved: 2018
- Ground: Stade de Beaulieu, Chartres
- 2017–18: National 3 Group C, 3rd

Horizon de Beaulieu Chartres was a French association football club, most recently known as Chartres Horizon. They were based in the town of Chartres and their home stadium was the Stade de Beaulieu. In May 2018, the club merged with FC Chartres to form C'Chartres Football.
