= Samuel Yohou =

French footballer (born 1991)

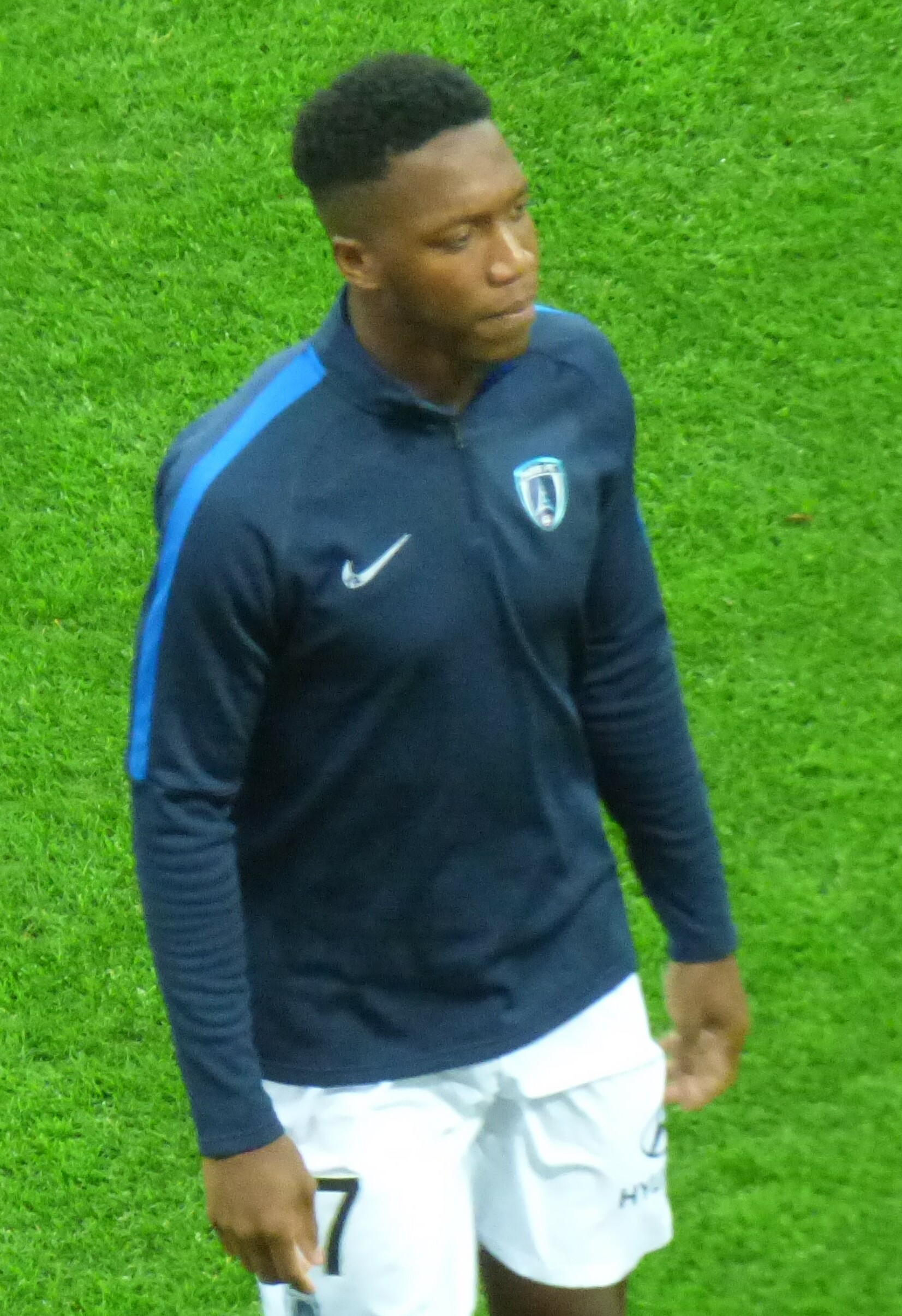
- Yohou in 2018

Personal information
- Date of birth: 6 August 1991 (age 35)
- Place of birth: Villepinte, France
- Height: 1.90 m (6 ft 3 in)
- Position: Defender

Team information
- Current team: Le Mans
- Number: 17

Youth career
- 2012–2015: Paris

Senior career*
Years	Team	Apps	(Gls)
2012–2015	Paris FC II	52	(1)
2015–2016	Paris FC	0	(0)
2016	→ Épinal (loan)	12	(1)
2016–2017	Béziers	24	(4)
2017–2020	Paris FC	70	(2)
2017–2018	Paris FC II	2	(1)
2020–2021	Tuzlaspor	19	(0)
2021–2022	Dunkerque	20	(0)
2022–2023	OFI	7	(0)
2023–	Le Mans	87	(8)

International career^{‡}
2011	Ivory Coast U20	2	(0)
- * Club domestic league appearances and goals as of 11 May 2026 ‡ National team caps and goals as of 1 October 2017

Samuel Yohou (born 6 August 1991) is a professional footballer who plays as a defender for Ligue 1 club Le Mans. Born in France, Yohou represents the Ivory Coast internationally.

== Club career ==
Yohou made his professional debut for Paris FC on 11 August 2015, playing the first half of the Coupe de la Ligue defeat against Metz before being replaced by Tiécoro Keita.

On 31 August 2021, he signed a two-year contract with Dunkerque.

On 27 July 2022, Yohou moved to OFI in Greece on a two-year contract.

== International career ==
Yohou represented the Ivory Coast U20 in the 2011 Toulon Tournament.

== Career statistics ==
As of 18 May 2016

Appearances and goals by club, season and competition
Club	Season	League			National Cup		League Cup		Total	
Club	Season	Division	Apps	Goals	Apps	Goals	Apps	Goals	Apps	Goals
Paris	2015–16	Ligue 2	0	0	0	0	1	0	1	0
Épinal (loan)	2015–16	Championnat National	12	1	0	0	0	0	12	1
Career total			12	1	0	0	1	0	13	1
