= Lucas Bretelle =

French footballer

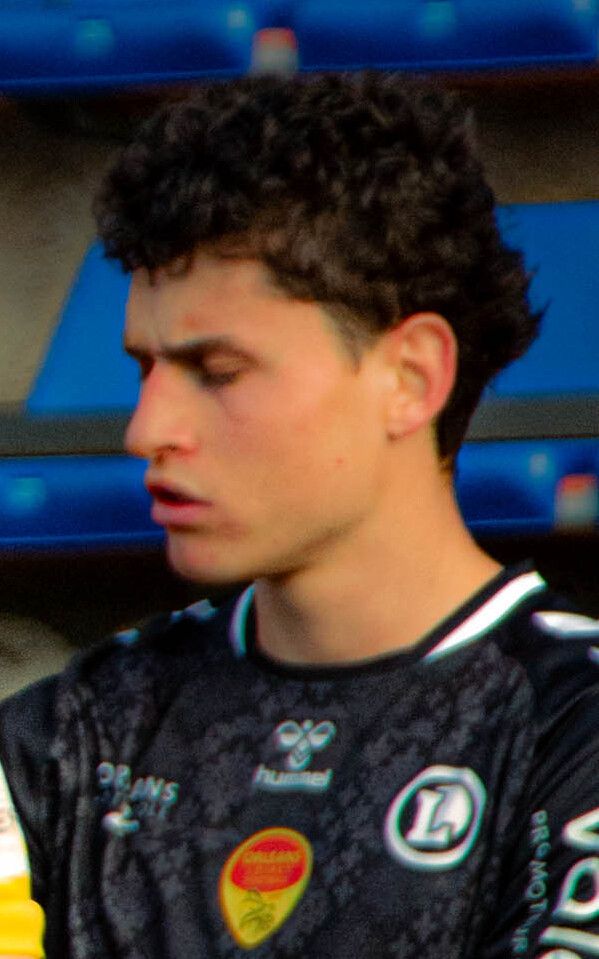
- Bretelle in 2024

Personal information
- Date of birth: April 17, 2002 (age 24)
- Place of birth: Paris, France
- Height: 1.72 m (5 ft 7 1/2 in)
- Position: Defensive midfielder

Team information
- Current team: Le Mans
- Number: 29

Youth career
- FC Rueil Malmaison
- 2016–2020: Lorient

Senior career*
Years	Team	Apps	(Gls)
2020–2023	Orléans II	29	(3)
2021–2025	Orléans	73	(5)
2025–2026	RAAL La Louvière	1	(0)
2026–	Le Mans	13	(2)
- * Club domestic league appearances and goals as of 17:36, 21 July 2026 (UTC)

Lucas Bretelle (born 17 April 2002) is a French footballer who plays as a defensive midfielder for Ligue 1 club Le Mans.

== Club career ==
Bretelle is a product of the youth academies of the French clubs FC Rueil Malmaison and Lorient. He moved to Orléans' reserve team in 2020. On 10 June 2022 signed his first professional contract with the club for one season with an option for two more. On 19 May 2025, he transferred to the Belgian Pro League club RAAL La Louvière on a 3-year contract. Hindered by an injury from the previous season, Bretelle transferred to Ligue 2 club Le Mans for the second half of the 2025–26 season. He helped Le Mans achieve promotion again to Ligue 1, and on 30 June 2026 extended his contract with the club until 2029.
