= Adil Bourabaa =

Algerian footballer

Personal information
- Full name: Adil Ali Mohamed Bourabaa
- Date of birth: 9 March 2005 (age 21)
- Place of birth: Drancy, France
- Position: Midfielder

Team information
- Current team: Le Mans
- Number: 11

Youth career
- Guingamp
- 2023–2024: Leganés

Senior career*
| Years | Team | Apps | (Gls) |
| 2024–2025 | Troyes II | 6 | (0) |
| 2025–2026 | Beauvais | 12 | (1) |
| 2026– | Le Mans | 18 | (3) |

International career^{‡}
| 2026– | Algeria U23 | 1 | (0) |
| 2026– | Algeria | 1 | (0) |
- * Club domestic league appearances and goals as of 18:55, 29 September 2026 (UTC) ‡ National team caps and goals as of 22:01, 6 October 2026 (UTC)

Adil Ali Mohamed Bourabaa (born 9 March 2005) is a professional footballer who plays as a midfielder for Ligue 1 club Le Mans. Born in France, he represents the Algeria national team.

== Club career ==
Bourabaa came through the youth ranks of the French club Guingamp, followed with a stint with Leganés in 2023. In 2024, he returned to France with the reserves of Troyes in Championnat National 2. On 25 July 2025, he joined Beauvais in the same division. On 1 February 2026, he transferred to Le Mans. He helped Le Mans achieve promotion to the Ligue 1 for the 2026–2027 season.

== International career ==
Born in France, Bourabaa is of Algerian descent and holds dual French and Algerian citizenship. He played for the Algeria under-23s for a friendly in May 2026.

Bourabaa made his debut for the senior Algeria national team on 6 October 2026 in friendly against Niger.
