= Edwin Quarshie =

Central African footballer (born 1995)

Personal information
- Date of birth: 29 October 1995 (age 30)
- Place of birth: Rennes, France
- Position: Midfielder

Team information
- Current team: Le Mans
- Number: 6

Youth career
- 2006–2008: TA Rennes
- 2008–2009: CPB Bréquigny
- 2009–2011: Lorient
- 2011–2014: Reims

Senior career*
Years	Team	Apps	(Gls)
2014–2015	CPB Bréquigny		
2015–2017	Sablé		
2017–2018	Villefranche	22	(1)
2018–2019	Bourg-en-Bresse	21	(0)
2019–2021	Sedan	17	(0)
2021–2022	GOAL FC	28	(8)
2022–	Le Mans	116	(6)

International career^{‡}
2026–	Central African Republic	1	(0)
- * Club domestic league appearances and goals as of 11 May 2026 ‡ National team caps and goals as of 24 September 2026

Edwin Quarshie (born 29 October 1995) is a professional footballer who plays as a midfielder for Ligue 1 club Le Mans and the Central African Republic national team.

After spending his early career in the French lower leagues, he joined Le Mans in 2022, where he was made captain. He won consecutive promotions to reach Ligue 1 in 2026. Born in France, he made his debut for the Central African Republic in 2026.

== Club career ==
=== Early career ===
Born in Rennes, Quarshie played as a youth for TA Rennes, CPB Bréquigny, FC Lorient and Stade de Reims, winning the Coupe Gambardella in 2014 with the last of those clubs. Due to injury, he did not receive a professional contract at Reims, and in the same year he returned to Bréquigny in the Régional 1 of football in Brittany.

Quarshie joined Sablé FC in 2015 and FC Villefranche Beaujolais two years later. His 2018–19 season in the fourth-tier Championnat National 2 ended after 22 games due to injury, while the team won promotion as champions and he joined fellow Championnat National club Football Bourg-en-Bresse Péronnas 01. In 2019, he dropped back into the fourth division with CS Sedan Ardennes, where injuries and the COVID-19 pandemic limited his games.

In August 2021, Quarshie left Sedan with a year remaining on his contract, and joined GOAL FC on a two-year deal. Untroubled by injury in the 2021–22 Championnat National 2, he played 27 games, scored eight goals and assisted two.

=== Le Mans ===
On 1 June 2022, Quarshie returned to the Championnat National, joining Le Mans FC alongside his older brother Jeffrey. He was signed by his former GOAL FC manager, Cris. He first captained the club on 29 April 2023 against Stade Briochin. On 23 May 2025, having been club captain as they won promotion in the 2024–25 Championnat National, he signed a new one-year contract.

On 9 August 2025, Quarshie scored the first goal of the Ligue 2 season on his competition debut with an 18th-minute half-volley. The game away to En Avant Guingamp ended in a 3–3 draw. Le Mans were in 16th of 18 teams on the seventh matchday, when they won 1–0 at home to Grenoble Foot 38; Quarshie reflected after the club were promoted to Ligue 1 in second place that this was the turning point in their season.

== International career ==
In September 2026, while not having featured for Le Mans in Ligue 1, Quarshie was called up for the Central African Republic national team, alongside clubmate Louis Mafouta. He made his debut on 24 September in a 2027 Africa Cup of Nations qualification match against Mauritania.

== Personal life ==
Quarshie is of Ghanaian and Central African descent. His older brother Jeffrey played as a forward.
