= Jean Vercruysse =

French footballer

Personal information
- Date of birth: 3 July 2000 (age 26)
- Place of birth: Hazebrouck, France
- Height: 1.83 m (6 ft 0 in)
- Position: Midfielder

Team information
- Current team: Le Mans
- Number: 10

Youth career
- Saint-Omer
- Montpellier

Senior career*
Years	Team	Apps	(Gls)
2019–2020	Montpellier II	20	(3)
2020–2021	Canet Roussillon FC	8	(1)
2021–2022	Boulogne II	10	(0)
2021–2025	Boulogne	89	(17)
2025–	Le Mans	9	(1)
- * Club domestic league appearances and goals as of 00:27, 21 July 2026 (UTC)

Jean Vercruysse (born 3 July 2000) is a French footballer who plays as a midfielder for Ligue 1 club Le Mans.

== Club career ==
Born in Hazebrouck in northern France, Vercruysse began his football education at US Saint-Omer before joining the academy of Montpellier HSC. He signed for Canet Roussillon FC in July 2020. In 2021, he transferred to Boulogne in the Championnat National. He was named to the "Championnat National Team of the Season" for 2024–25, as he helped Boulogne achieve promotion to Ligue 2.

On 7 June 2025, Vercruysse transferred to newly promoted Ligue 2 side Le Mans. On 17 October 2025, he suffered an anterior cruciate ligament tear that ended his season early. The club earned promotion to Ligue 1, and on 17 July 2026 he extended his contract with the club until 2028.

== Personal life ==
Born in France, Vercruysse is of Flemish descent.

== Honours ==
Individual

- 2024–25 Championnat National Team of the Season
