= Frédéric Gueguen =

French footballer (born 1970)

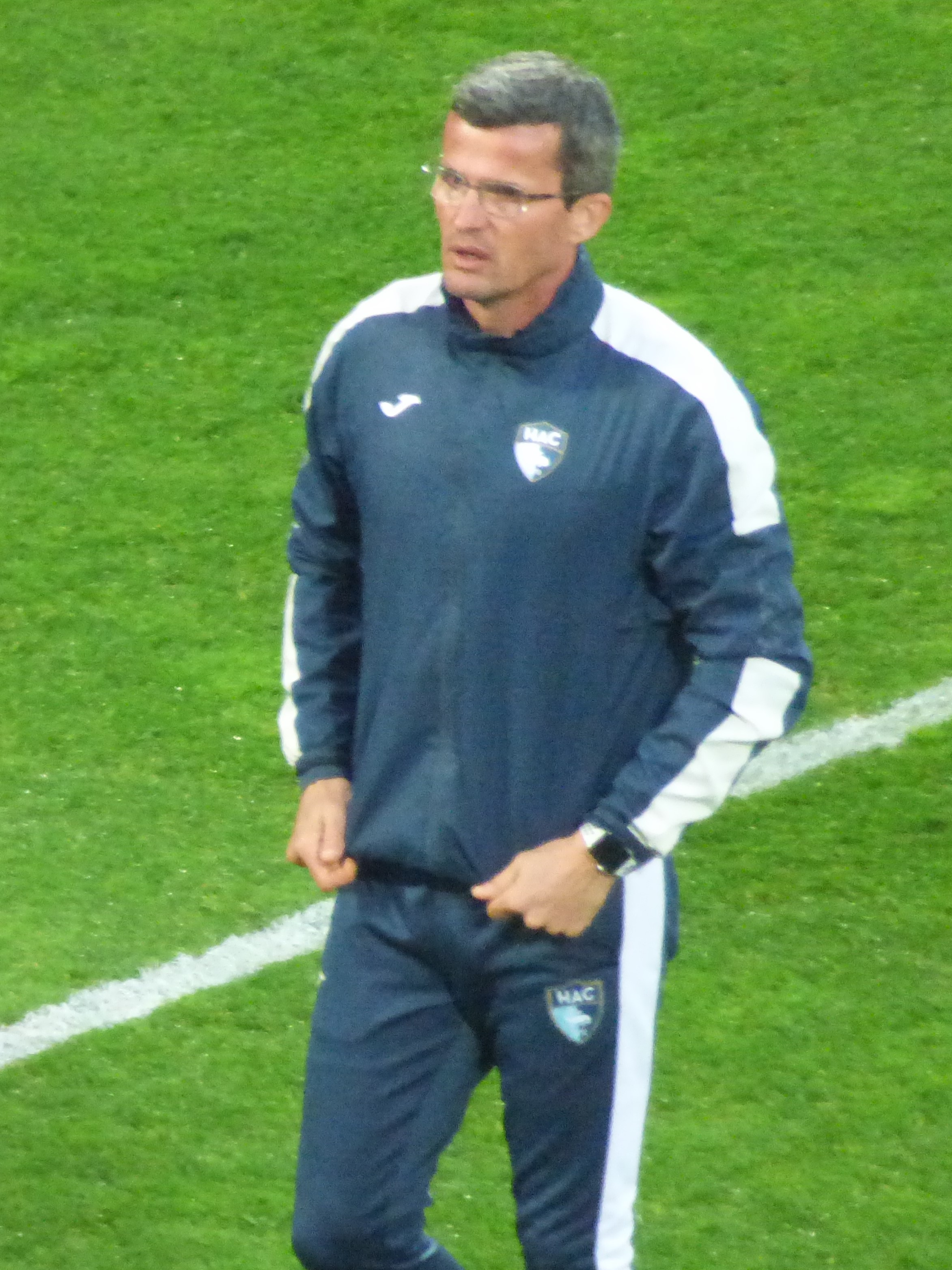
- Guéguen in 2019

Personal information
- Date of birth: 2 December 1970 (age 55)
- Place of birth: Brest, France
- Height: 1.82 m (6 ft 0 in)
- Position: Goalkeeper

Senior career*
Years	Team	Apps	(Gls)
1990–1994	Brest	0	(0)
1994–1995	Montluçon		
1995–1999	Châteauroux	118	(0)
1999–2000	Chamois Niortais	29	(0)
2000–2002	Grenoble	66	(0)
2002–2004	Laval	61	(0)
2004–2005	Rouen	0	(0)

International career
1998	Brittany	1	(0)

Managerial career
- 2006–2008: Châteauroux (GK coach)
- 2008–2009: Tours (GK coach)
- 2009–2013: Le Havre (GK coach)
- 2014–2016: Saran
- 2016–2017: Grenoble B
- 2016–2017: Grenoble (assistant)
- 2017–2019: Le Havre (GK coach)
- 2019–2020: Toulouse (GK coach)
- 2020–2021: Grenoble B
- 2021–2026: Grenoble (assistant)
- 2021: Grenoble (caretaker)
- 2024–2025: Grenoble (caretaker)
- 2026: Grenoble (caretaker)
- * Club domestic league appearances and goals

Frédéric Gueguen (born 2 December 1970) is a French professional football coach and a former goalkeeper. He mostly works as a goalkeeping coach, but acted as a caretaker manager for Grenoble on several occasions.
