= Antoine Rabillard =

French footballer (born 1995)

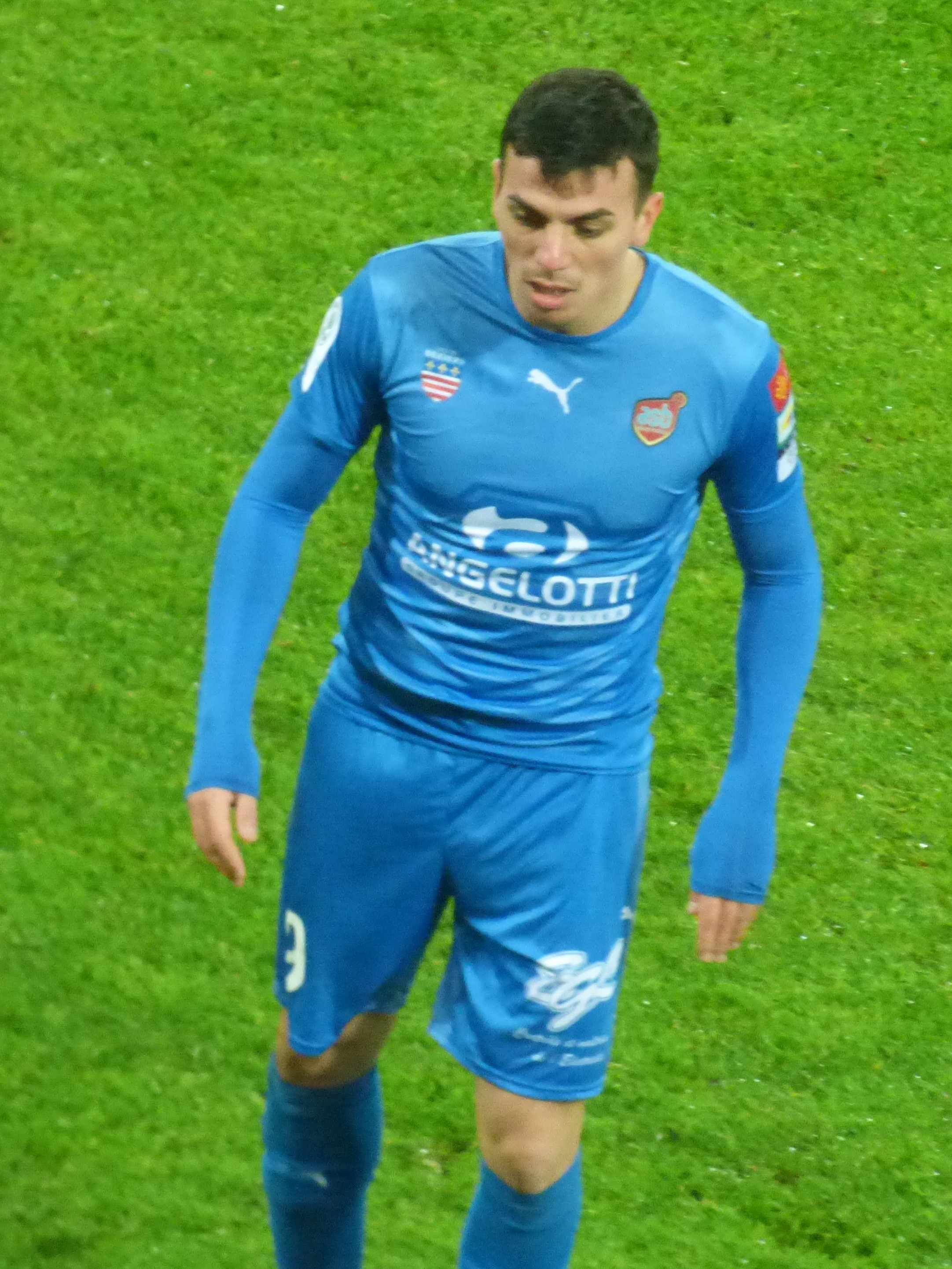
- Rabillard with Béziers in 2019

Personal information
- Date of birth: 22 September 1995 (age 31)
- Place of birth: Rodez, France
- Height: 1.75 m (5 ft 9 in)
- Position: Forward

Team information
- Current team: Le Mans
- Number: 9

Youth career
- Béziers

Senior career*
Years	Team	Apps	(Gls)
2012–2014	Béziers	3	(0)
2014–2016	Marseille II	52	(10)
2016–2017	Marseille	5	(1)
2017–2019	Béziers	51	(9)
2019–2021	Go Ahead Eagles	53	(15)
2021–2023	Concarneau	51	(15)
2023–	Le Mans	87	(17)
- * Club domestic league appearances and goals as of 11 May 2026

Antoine Rabillard (born 22 September 1995) is a French footballer who plays as a forward for Ligue 1 club Le Mans.

== Club career ==
Rabillard joined Marseille in 2014 from Béziers. He made his Ligue 1 debut on 10 January 2016 against En Avant Guingamp.

On 31 July 2021, he returned to France and joined Concarneau in the third tier on a two-year contract.

On 21 June 2023, after Concarneau's promotion to Ligue 2, he joined Le Mans.
