= 2024–25 Championnat National =

Championnat National
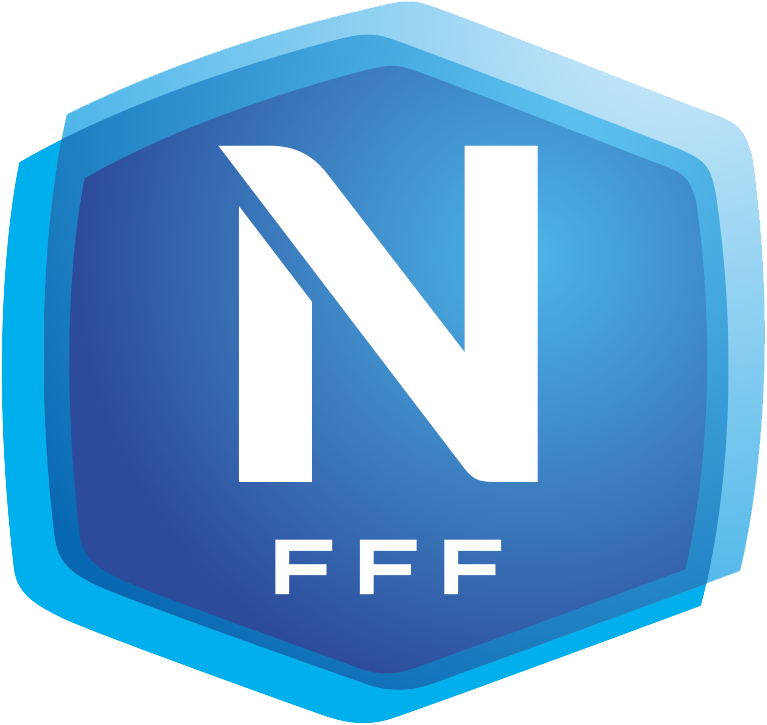
- Season: 2024–25
- Dates: 16 August 2024 – 16 May 2025
- Champions: Nancy (1st title)
- Promoted: Nancy; Le Mans; Boulogne
- Relegated: Nîmes

The 2024–25 Championnat National season was the 32nd since the establishment of the Championnat National and the 26th in its current format, which served as the third division of the French football league system.

== Team changes ==
Team changes from 2023–24 Championnat National.

=== To National ===
Promoted from 2023–24 Championnat National 2

- Aubagne
- Paris 13 Atletico
- US Boulogne
- Bourg-Péronnas

Relegated from 2023–24 Ligue 2

- Quevilly-Rouen
- Concarneau
- Valenciennes

=== From National ===
Relegated to 2024–25 Championnat National 2

- GOAL FC
- Avranches
- Marignane GCB
- Épinal

Administratively relegated to 2024–25 Régional 1

- Niort

Administratively relegated to 2024–25 Régional 3

- Cholet

Promoted to 2024–25 Ligue 2

- Red Star
- Martigues

=== Stadia and locations ===
Location of teams in 2024–25 National

Club	Location	Venue	Capacity
Aubagne	Aubagne	Stade de Lattre-de-Tassigny	1,000
Boulogne	Boulogne-sur-Mer	Stade de la Libération	9,534
Bourg-Péronnas	Bourg-en-Bresse	Stade Marcel-Verchère	11,400
Châteauroux	Châteauroux	Stade Gaston Petit	17,173
Concarneau	Concarneau	Stade Guy-Piriou	5,800
Dijon	Dijon	Stade Gaston Gérard	15,995
Le Mans	Le Mans	Stade Marie-Marvingt	25,000
Nancy	Nancy	Stade Marcel Picot	20,087
Nîmes	Nîmes	Stade des Antonins	8,033
Orléans	Orléans	Stade de la Source	7,000
Paris 13 Atletico	Paris (Paris 13)	Stade Pelé	995
Quevilly-Rouen	Rouen	Stade Robert Diochon	12,018
Rouen	Rouen	Stade Robert Diochon	12,108
Sochaux	Montbéliard	Stade Auguste Bonal	20,005
Valenciennes	Valenciennes	Stade du Hainaut	25,172
Versailles	Paris (Paris 16)	Stade Jean-Bouin	19,904
Villefranche	Villefranche-sur-Saône	Stade Armand Chouffet	3,500

=== Number of teams by regions ===
Teams	Region	Team(s)
2	Auvergne-Rhône-Alpes	Bourg-Péronnas and Villefranche
2	Bourgogne-Franche-Comté	Dijon and Sochaux
2	Centre-Val de Loire	Châteauroux and Orléans
2	Hauts-de-France	Boulogne and Valenciennes
2	Île-de-France	Versailles and Paris 13 Atletico
2	Normandy	Quevilly-Rouen and Rouen
1	Brittany	Concarneau
1	Grand Est	Nancy
1	Occitanie	Nîmes
1	Pays de la Loire	Le Mans
1	Provence-Alpes-Côte d'Azur	Aubagne

== League table ==
Pos	Team	Pld	W	D	L	GF	GA	GD	Pts	Promotion or relegation
1	Nancy (C, P)	32	20	5	7	54	28	+26	65	Promotion to Ligue 2
2	Le Mans (P)	32	17	7	8	48	34	+14	58	Promotion to Ligue 2
3	Boulogne (P)	32	15	11	6	46	34	+12	56	Qualification to promotion play-offs (Note: Despite losing the promotion play-offs, Boulogne were promoted after Ajaccio were administratively relegated.)
4	Dijon	32	12	11	9	37	35	+2	47	
5	Bourg-Péronnas	32	12	10	10	26	28	−2	46	
6	Aubagne	32	13	6	13	43	37	+6	45	
7	Orléans	32	12	9	11	43	41	+2	45	
8	Concarneau	32	11	9	12	48	46	+2	42	
9	Valenciennes	32	10	12	10	38	36	+2	42	
10	Rouen	32	9	13	10	42	39	+3	40	
11	Quevilly-Rouen	32	11	7	14	31	41	−10	40	
12	Sochaux	32	8	14	10	29	30	−1	38	
13	Versailles	32	8	12	12	41	44	−3	36	
14	Paris 13 Atletico	32	7	14	11	32	38	−6	35	
15	Villefranche	32	7	13	12	29	37	−8	34	
16	Châteauroux	32	8	9	15	40	62	−22	33	Spared from relegation (Note: Châteauroux were spared from relegation after Martigues were administratively relegated from Ligue 2.)
17	Nîmes (R)	32	6	10	16	24	41	−17	28	Relegation to Championnat National 2

Source: soccerway
Rules for classification: 1) head-to-head results; 2) head-to-head goal difference; 3) goal difference; 4) goals scored; 5) fair play points
(C) Champions; (P) Promoted; (R) Relegated

== Results ==
Home \ Away	AUB	BOU	BBP	CHA	CON	DIJ	LMA	NAN	NIM	ORL	P13	QUE	ROU	SOC	VAL	VER	VIL
Aubagne	—	3–0	1–0	6–2	0–2	1–2	1–0	2–1	2–0	1–0	1–1	1–1	2–1	0–1	0–3	3–3	1–2
Boulogne	1–1	—	1–1	1–1	2–1	2–2	3–2	1–1	2–1	3–0	3–1	2–0	1–2	2–3	0–0	1–0	1–0
Bourg-Péronnas	2–1	1–1	—	0–0	0–0	2–1	0–1	1–0	2–1	0–0	1–1	1–1	0–1	1–1	1–0	1–0	0–0
Châteauroux	2–7	0–1	2–0	—	1–0	3–3	1–2	0–2	3–2	2–0	1–1	4–3	1–0	1–0	1–2	2–2	2–2
Concarneau	0–0	1–1	2–1	3–1	—	1–2	5–2	0–2	1–0	1–2	2–0	5–1	1–1	1–1	1–1	4–2	1–1
Dijon	1–0	0–3	0–1	4–0	0–1	—	0–5	0–1	0–0	2–2	2–0	3–3	1–0	0–0	2–1	2–0	2–0
Le Mans	1–1	1–0	1–2	2–0	3–1	0–0	—	0–4	4–0	0–2	1–0	2–1	2–2	1–1	2–1	2–0	0–0
Nancy	2–0	0–2	1–0	1–0	3–0	0–1	2–0	—	1–0	1–0	1–2	4–1	1–1	1–0	1–2	3–2	2–0
Nîmes	2–4	2–0	1–3	1–0	3–0	0–0	0–0	1–2	—	1–2	0–0	0–2	2–2	1–1	0–0	1–0	1–0
Orléans	2–1	1–1	1–0	1–1	2–3	1–1	1–2	1–5	3–0	—	3–1	0–0	1–3	4–2	4–1	2–3	1–1
Paris 13 Atletico	1–0	0–1	0–1	3–2	2–1	0–0	2–3	2–2	1–1	0–1	—	0–1	1–0	1–1	1–1	1–1	1–0
Quevilly-Rouen	1–0	0–1	0–0	1–2	2–1	2–1	1–2	0–1	0–1	1–1	1–0	—	2–1	1–0	2–0	1–3	0–1
Rouen	0–1	3–1	2–1	4–0	4–3	0–0	2–2	2–2	1–0	0–2	2–2	2–0	—	0–0	1–1	0–0	2–4
Sochaux	0–1	1–1	0–1	2–2	1–0	1–2	0–1	2–3	1–1	0–0	0–0	2–0	2–1	—	2–0	0–0	2–1
Valenciennes	1–0	2–3	1–2	3–1	3–3	2–0	0–1	3–4	2–0	1–0	1–1	0–0	0–0	1–0	—	0–0	2–2
Versailles	2–0	2–3	3–0	1–0	1–2	2–3	1–0	0–0	2–1	1–3	3–3	0–1	1–1	1–1	1–1	—	1–1
Villefranche	0–1	1–1	1–1	2–2	1–1	1–0	0–3	2–0	0–0	2–0	1–1	0–1	2–1	0–1	0–2	1–3	—

Source: soccerway
Legend: Blue = home team win; Yellow = draw; Red = away team win.

== Promotion play-offs ==
20 May 2025
20:45 CEST (UTC+2)

Boulogne	1–3	Clermont
Epailly 23'	Report	Diop 31'; Koré 79'; Diédhiou 85'

Stade de la Libération, Boulogne-sur-Mer
Attendance: 5,813
Referee: Guillaume Paradis
25 May 2025
17:00 CEST (UTC+2)

Clermont	1–2 (4-3 agg)	Boulogne
Diédhiou 73'	Report	Averlant 55'; Vercruysse 70'

Stade Gabriel-Montpied, Clermont-Ferrand
Attendance: 9,096

Clermont won 4–3 on aggregate. Boulogne were promoted after Ajaccio were administratively relegated.

== Top scorers ==
As of 16 May 2025.

Rank	Player	Club	Goals
1	(France) Fahd El Khoumisti	Orléans	17
2	(Algeria) Oussama Abdeldjelil	Nîmes	16
3	(France) Hicham Benkaid	Rouen	15
4	(France) Samy Baghdadi	Versailles	13
5	(Mauritania) Mamadou Diallo	Châteauroux	12
5	(France) Steven Nsimba	Aubagne	12

== Attendances ==
#	Football club	Average attendance
1	AS Nancy-Lorraine	10,445
2	FC Sochaux-Montbéliard	9,966
3	Le Mans FC	6,970
4	Valenciennes FC	6,284
5	Dijon FCO	5,025
6	FC Rouen	4,393
7	US Boulogne	4,351
8	US Orléans	2,841
9	La Berrichonne de Châteauroux	2,607
10	US Quevilly-Rouen Métropole	2,446
11	US Concarneau	2,090
12	Nîmes Olympique	1,582
13	FC Villefranche	1,514
14	Bourg-en-Bresse Péronnas	1,388
15	FC Versailles 78	793
16	Aubagne FC	411
17	Paris 13 Atletico	405
