= Martin Rossignol =

French footballer

Personal information
- Date of birth: 3 November 2003 (age 22)
- Place of birth: Le Mans, France
- Height: 1.71 m (5 ft 7 in)
- Position: Midfielder

Team information
- Current team: Le Mans
- Number: 27

Youth career
- Le Mans

Senior career*
Years	Team	Apps	(Gls)
2021–2023	Le Mans II	12	(1)
2022–	Le Mans	81	(4)
2024	→Haguenau (loan)	11	(2)
- * Club domestic league appearances and goals as of 16:46, 21 July 2026 (UTC)

Martin Rossignol (born 3 November 2003) is a French footballer who plays as a midfielder for Ligue 1 club Le Mans.

== Club career ==
On 2 June 2022, Rossignol signed a professional contract with Le Mans and was promoted to their first team in the Championnat National. On 1 February 2024, he joined Haguenau on loan for the second half of the season in 2023–2024. He returned to Le Mans and on 19 May 2025, he extended his contract with Le Mans as they achieved promotion to Ligue 2.
