= Théo Eyoum =

French footballer

Personal information
- Full name: Théo Eyoum Mouen
- Date of birth: 7 January 2002 (age 24)
- Place of birth: Rennes, France
- Height: 1.84 m (6 ft 0 in)
- Position: Centre-back

Team information
- Current team: Le Mans
- Number: 21

Youth career
- CPB Bréquigny
- TA Rennes

Senior career*
Years	Team	Apps	(Gls)
2020–2022	Rennes II	23	(0)
2022–2023	Le Mans II	7	(0)
2022–	Le Mans	77	(2)
- * Club domestic league appearances and goals as of 14:43, 21 July 2026 (UTC)

Théo Eyoum Mouen (born 7 January 2002) is a French footballer who plays as a centre-back for Ligue 1 club Le Mans.

== Club career ==
Eyoum is a product of the youth academies of the French clubs US Saint-Gilles, CPB Bréquigny and TA Rennes. On 3 July 2020, he moved to Rennes on a trainee contract, and started playing for their reserves in the Championnat National 2. On 23 November 2022, he signed a professional contract with Le Mans and was promoted to their senior team in the Championnat National. On 25 June 2025, he extended his contract with the club as they achieve promotion to Ligue 2.

== Personal life ==
Born in France, Eyoum is of Cameroonian descent.
