= Rodez AF =

French football club, based in Rodez

- Full name: Rodez Aveyron Football
- Nicknames: Le RAF; Les Sangs et Or (The Blood and Golds)
- Founded: 1929; 97 years ago
- Ground: Stade Paul-Lignon, Rodez
- Capacity: 5,955
- President: Pierre-Olivier Murat
- Head coach: Didier Santini
- League: Ligue 2
- 2025–26: Ligue 2, 5th of 18
- Website: rodezaveyronfootball.com
Home colours	Away colours

Rodez Aveyron Football (Occitan: Rodés Avairon) is a French association football club based in Rodez. The club was founded in 1929 and currently plays in Ligue 2, the second level of French football. The club plays its home matches at the Stade Paul Lignon located within the city. The women's squad was founded in 1993 and are known as the Rafettes. They play in the Division 1 Féminine, the top division in France.

From 1988–1993, Rodez played in Ligue 2, and on 11 April 2019 secured promotion back to this level after 26 years in the lower divisions.

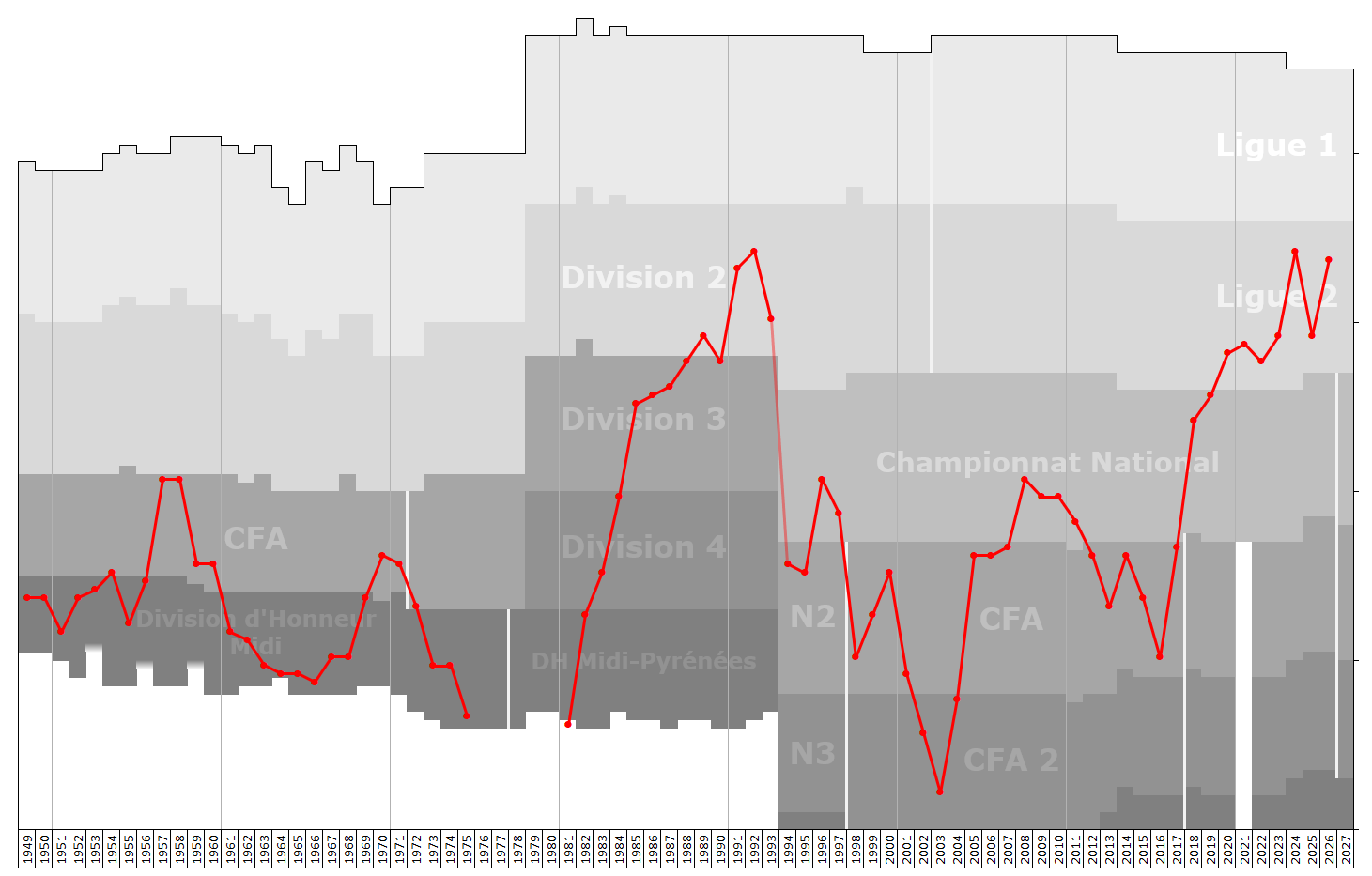
Historical league performance chart of Rodez AF

== Players ==
=== Current squad ===
As of 8 September 2027.

Note: Flags indicate national team as defined under FIFA eligibility rules; some limited exceptions apply. Players may hold more than one non-FIFA nationality.

No.	Pos.	Nation	Player
1	GK	FRA	Quentin Braat
3	DF	FRA	Raphaël Lipinski
4	DF	SUI	Mathis Magnin
5	DF	FRA	Mohamed Sylla
6	MF	CPV	Jordan Mendes
7	FW	FRA	Kenny Nagera
8	MF	SRB	Damjan Pavlović
9	FW	BEL	Nachon Nsingi
10	MF	FRA	Mathis Saka (on loan from Toulouse)
11	FW	FRA	Mathis Touho
13	FW	FRA	Corentin Issanchou
15	DF	FRA	Jean Lambert Evans
16	GK	FRA	Lucas Margueron

No.	Pos.	Nation	Player
17	DF	FRA	Dylan Vangi
19	FW	FRA	Hermann Tebily
20	DF	MAD	Ryan Ponti
21	FW	FRA	Kélian Nsona
22	MF	FRA	Octave Joly
23	DF	MLI	Cheick Doumbia
24	DF	FRA	Loni Laurent
27	FW	FRA	Marco Essimi
28	DF	FRA	Steven Luyambula
29	MF	FRA	Antonin Cartillier
30	GK	FRA	Enzo Crombez
34	MF	FRA	Yanis Dahalani

=== Out on loan ===
Note: Flags indicate national team as defined under FIFA eligibility rules; some limited exceptions apply. Players may hold more than one non-FIFA nationality.

No.	Pos.	Nation	Player
—	FW	FRA	Ibrahima Baldé (at Lorient until 30 June 2027)

=== Notable players ===
- (France) Martin Adeline
- (France) Valentin Rosier

== Staff ==
Management/Sports
Position	Name
Chairman	Pierre-Olivier Murat
General Manager	Grégory Ursule
Head coach	Didier Santini
Assistant Coaches	Jérôme Fournier
Assistant Coaches	Alassane Sawadogo
Goalkeeper Coach	David Manhaval

== Honours ==
- Division 3
  - Runners-up (1): 1990
  - Winners (3): 1988 (Southwest group), 1990 (Central West group), 2018–19
- Championnat de France amateur
  - Winners (1): 2007 (Group C)
- Championnat de France amateur 2
  - Winners (1): 2004 (Group F)
- Division 4
  - Winners (1): 1984 (Group G)
- Division d'Honneur (Midi-Pyrénées)
  - Champions (3): 1956, 1969, 1982
