= Mathis Saka =

French footballer

Personal information
- Date of birth: 20 September 2006 (age 20)
- Place of birth: Toulouse, France
- Height: 1.72 m (5 ft 8 in)
- Position: Attacking midfielder

Team information
- Current team: Rodez (on loan from Toulouse)
- Number: 10

Youth career
- 2011–2015: JS Cugnaux
- 2015–2018: Colomiers
- 2018–2024: Toulouse

Senior career*
Years	Team	Apps	(Gls)
2024–	Toulouse II	14	(1)
2025–	Toulouse	2	(0)
2025–2026	→ Rodez (loan)	24	(1)
2026–	→ Rodez (loan)	1	(0)

International career^{‡}
2024	France U19	2	(0)
- * Club domestic league appearances and goals as of 5 September 2026 ‡ National team caps and goals as of 01:49, 13 May 2025 (UTC)

Mathis Saka (born 20 September 2006) is a French professional footballer who plays as an attacking midfielder for Ligue 2 club Rodez on loan from Toulouse.

== Club career ==
Saka is a youth product of JS Cugnaux, Colomiers and Toulouse. On 14 June 2024, he signed his first professional contract with Toulouse and was promoted to their reserves. On 15 January 2025, he made his senior and professional debut with Toulouse in a 2–1 Coupe de France win over Laval. He made his Ligue 1 debut for Toulouse on 24 August 2025 against Brest.

On 1 September 2025, Saka was loaned by Rodez in Ligue 2 for the 2025–26 season. After returning to Toulouse and appearing in their 2026–27 Ligue 1 season opener, on 31 August 2026 Saka returned to Rodez on a new loan, with an option to buy.

== International career ==
In September 2024, Saka was called up to the France U19s for a set of friendlies.
