= Le Mans FC =

French football club

Le Mans
- Full name: Le Mans Football Club
- Nicknames: MUC 72; Les Mucistes; Les Sang et Or (The Blood and Golds)
- Founded: 12 June 1985; 41 years ago
- Stadium: Stade Marie-Marvingt
- Capacity: 25,064
- Owner: OutField Inc
- President: Pedro Oliveira
- Head coach: Patrick Videira
- League: Ligue 1
- 2025–26: Ligue 2, 2nd of 18 (promoted)
- Website: lemansfc.fr
Home colours	Away colours	Third colours

Le Mans Football Club (French pronunciation: [ləmɑ̃]; commonly referred to as Le Mans FC) is a French professional football club based in Le Mans. The club competes in Ligue 1, the first tier of French football, following successive promotions from Championnat National in 2024–25 and Ligue 2 in 2025–26.

The club was founded in 1985 as a result of a merger under the name Le Mans Union Club 72 (abbreviated as MUC 72). In 2010, Le Mans changed its name to Le Mans FC to coincide with the re-modeling of the club, which included moving into a new stadium, the Stade Marie-Marvingt, which opened in January 2011. The stadium is based in the interior of the Circuit de la Sarthe, a famous circuit in the city.

The club were controversially relegated from 2019–20 Ligue 2 when the season was terminated early due to the COVID-19 pandemic.

== History ==
Le Mans Sports Club were founded in 1900, but it was not until 1908 that a football club existed within it. Le Mans qualified for the Championnat de la France in 1910, but were heavily overturned by Saint-Servan. Gaining a huge reputation up to World War I, Le Mans SC plunged into obscurity by World War II before joining the war league in 1942.

The football section of Union Sportive du Mans was founded in 1903.

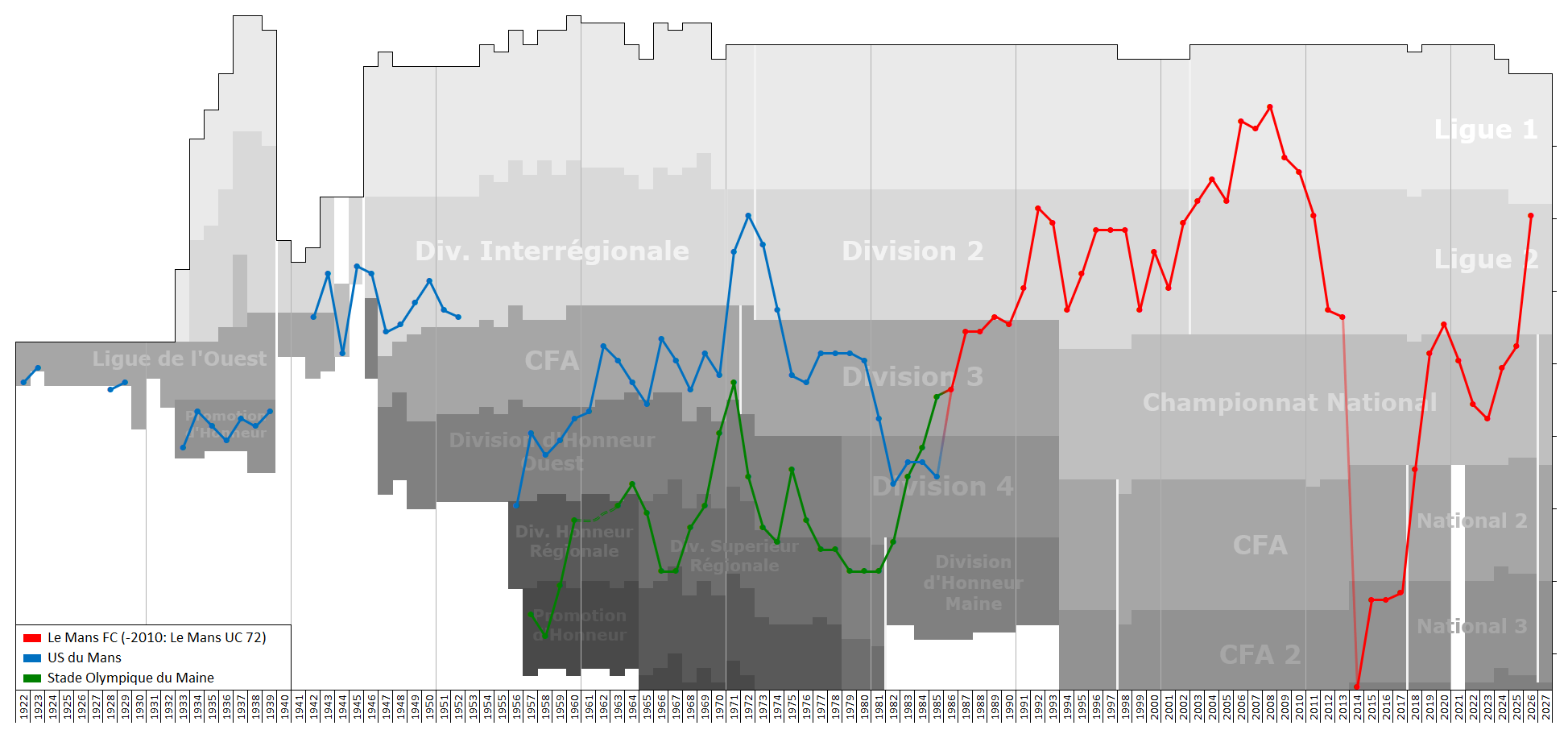
Historical league performance chart of Le Mans FC

The current club was formed through a merger between Union Sportive du Mans and Le Mans Sports Club on 12 June 1985. Upon its founding, former football player Bernard Deferrez was appointed manager. Le Mans UC spent most of its early years in Ligue 2. In the 2003–04 season, the club achieved promotion to Ligue 1 for the first time, but were immediately relegated. Le Mans returned to the first division for the 2005–06 season and successfully remained in the league for the next four seasons. The club suffered relegation back to Ligue 2 in the 2009–10 season. Midway through the campaign, on 2 December 2009, Le Mans announced that it was changing its name from Le Mans Union Club 72 to Le Mans FC.

The Stade Marie-Marvingt Stadium exterior

Le Mans moved to the MMArena midway through the 2010–11 season, comfortably in the promotion spots for a return to Ligue 1, but a bad run sees them finish 4th, missing promotion on goal difference. The failure to achieve promotion is costly, as the club sees its payroll limited by the DNCG. Many players left, and relegation was only narrowly avoided. The club survived by appeal an attempt by DNCG to relegate them to Championnat National. The following season they were relegated on the field, and a long summer of legal battles saw them liquidated and reforming in Maine (province) Division d'Honneur as an amateur club.

Promotion to Championnat de France Amateur 2 was achieved on the first attempt, and promotion from that division was only narrowly missed in 2014–15 and 2015–16. On the third attempt, promotion to the new Championnat National 2 was obtained in 2016–17, when Le Mans finished as one of the best runners up in the competition. Le Mans was promoted for the second season in a row winning Group D and being promoted to the 2018–19 Championnat National, the club would achieve a third consecutive promotion after successfully overcoming Gazélec Ajaccio in the Ligue 2 relegation play-off final with a 3-2 aggregate score, swapping places with the Corsican club who, only three years before had been members of the top-flight themselves.

The club were in 19th place in Ligue 2 when the season was terminated early due to the COVID-19 pandemic. Despite the club supporting an LFP proposal which would have seen Ligue 2 operate temporarily with 22 clubs, meaning they would stay in the division, the FFF ruled on 27 May 2020 that they were to be relegated to Championnat National.

On 17 May 2025, Le Mans secured promotion to Ligue 2 from next season after win against FC Versailles 2–0 in Final matchweek and return to second tier after five years absence.

In August 2025, Tennis champion Novak Djokovic became a co-owner of Le Mans FC. The acquisition was made through the Brazilian consortium OutField, alongside Formula 1 drivers Felipe Massa and Kevin Magnussen, as well as Georgios Frangulis, CEO of the OakBerry brand. In February 2026, Thibaut Courtois also joined the ownership group after investing in OutField through his investment company NxtPlay, further strengthening the consortium led by Djokovic. On 10 May 2026, Le Mans secured promotion to Ligue 1 from next season after a 2–0 away victory over Bastia on final matchday, returning to top flight after seventeen years absence.

== Players ==
=== Current squad ===
As of 8 September 2026.

Note: Flags indicate national team as defined under FIFA eligibility rules; some limited exceptions apply. Players may hold more than one non-FIFA nationality.

No.	Pos.	Nation	Player
1	GK	FRA	Ewan Hatfout
5	DF	MTQ	Harold Voyer
6	MF	CAF	Edwin Quarshie (captain)
7	FW	ALG	Billal Brahimi
8	MF	FRA	Alexandre Lauray
9	FW	FRA	Antoine Rabillard
10	MF	FRA	Jean Vercruysse
11	MF	ALG	Adil Bourabaa
12	DF	BRA	João Almeida (on loan from Coritiba)
13	FW	SEN	Habib Diallo
14	FW	CAF	Louis Mafouta
15	DF	FRA	Noa Boissé
16	DF	ESP	Raúl Torrente (on loan from Dinamo Zagreb)
17	DF	FRA	Samuel Yohou
18	DF	FRA	Lucas Buades

No.	Pos.	Nation	Player
19	DF	FRA	Djibril Sidibé
20	FW	FRA	William Harhouz
21	DF	FRA	Théo Eyoum
22	DF	FRA	Lucas Calodat
23	MF	FRA	Daouda Traoré (on loan from Southampton)
25	FW	SEN	Dame Gueye
26	DF	FRA	Rayan Bamba (on loan from Rennes)
27	MF	FRA	Martin Rossignol
28	FW	FRA	Erwan Colas
29	MF	FRA	Lucas Bretelle
55	GK	FRA	Augustin Delbecque
76	DF	ALG	Yasser Larouci
98	GK	FRA	Nicolas Kocik
99	FW	BRA	Enzo Vagner (on loan from Coritiba)

=== Out on loan ===
Note: Flags indicate national team as defined under FIFA eligibility rules; some limited exceptions apply. Players may hold more than one non-FIFA nationality.

No.	Pos.	Nation	Player
—	DF	FRA	Nathan Tronchet (at Haguenau until 30 June 2027)
—	MF	FRA	Izhak Hammoudi (at Bourges until 30 June 2027)

=== Notable players ===
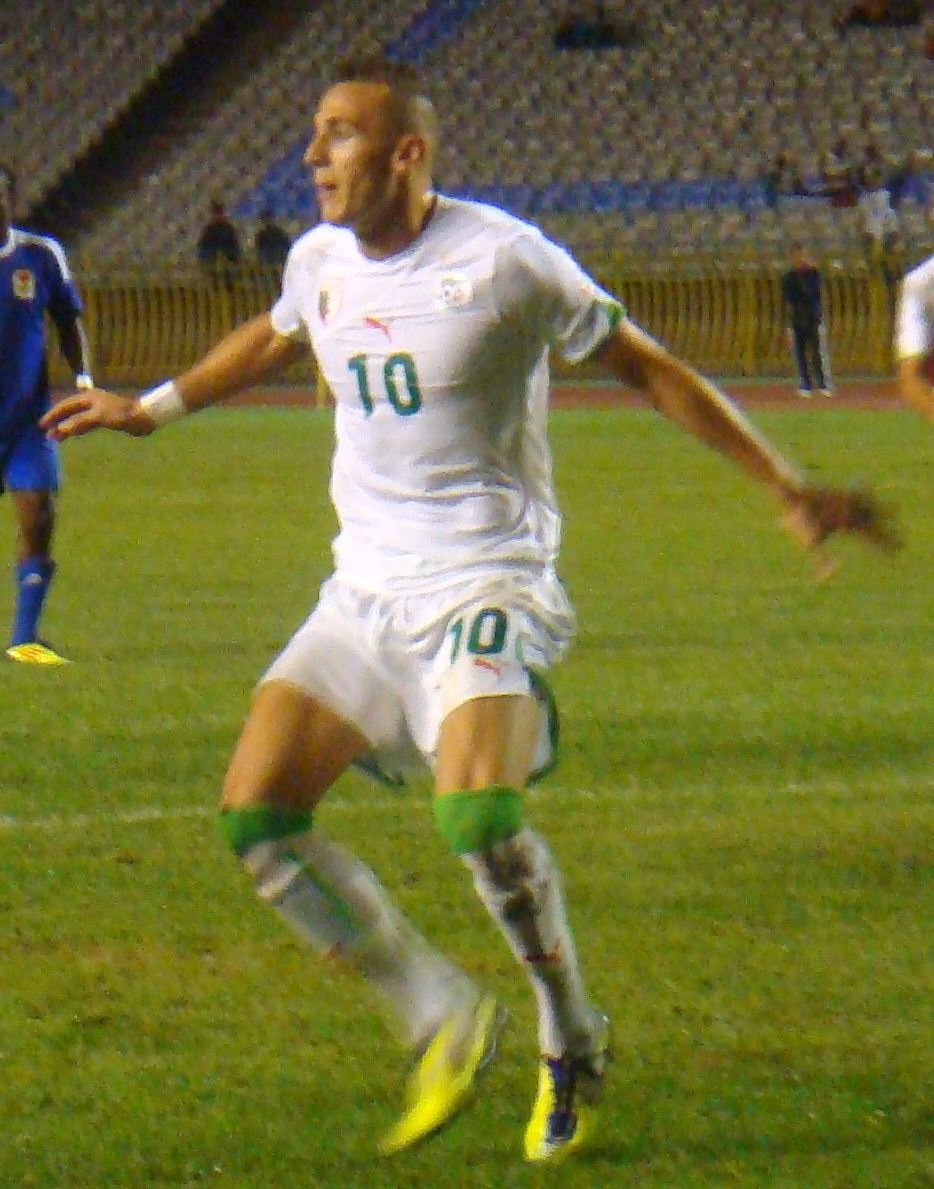
Hassan Yebda

Below are the notable former players who have represented Le Mans and its predecessors in league and international competition since the club's foundation in 1985. To appear in the section below, a player must have played in at least 100 official matches for the club.

For a complete list of Le Mans players, see Category:Le Mans FC players

- (France) Arnaud Denis
- (France) Ludovic Baal
- (Ivory Coast) Dagui Bakari
- (Guinea) Ismaël Bangoura
- (Montenegro) Marko Baša
- (France) Régis Beunardeau
- (France) Willy Bolivard
- (France) Laurent Bonnart
- (France) Grégory Cerdan
- (France) Sébastien Corchia
- (Gabon) Daniel Cousin
- (France) Mathieu Coutadeur
- (France) Vincent Créhin
- (France) Joffrey Cuffaut
- (France) Thomas Dasquet
- (Brazil) Tulio De Melo
- (Ivory Coast) Stéphane Diarra
- (Burkina Faso) Moussa Doumbia
- (Ivory Coast) Didier Drogba
- (France) Tom Duponchelle
- (France) Romain Dupont
- (Norway) Dan Eggen
- (Cameroon) Patrick Ekeng Ekeng
- (France) James Fanchone
- (France) Thibault Ferrand
- (France) Yannick Fischer
- (France) Thierry Froger
- (France) Eric Garcin
- (Brazil) Antônio Géder
- (Ivory Coast) Gervinho
- (Brazil) Grafite
- (Morocco) Hamza Hafidi
- (France) Yohan Hautcoeur
- (Norway) Thorstein Helstad
- (Belgium) Roland Lamah
- (France) Pierre Lemonnier
- (France) Anthony Le Tallec
- (France) Cyriaque Louvion
- (Mali) Modibo Maïga
- (Japan) Daisuke Matsui
- (Gabon) Didier Ovono
- (France) Fabrice Pancrate
- (France) Pierre Patron
- (France) Olivier Pédémas
- (France) Yohann Pelé
- (France) Christian Penaud
- (France) Laurent Peyrelade
- (France) Yoann Poulard
- (France) Réginald Ray
- (Ivory Coast) Romaric
- (France) Stéphane Samson
- (France) Morgan Sanson
- (Benin) Stéphane Sessègnon
- (Cameroon) Jacques Songo'o
- (Ivory Coast) Mamadou Soro
- (Norway) Fredrik Strømstad
- (France) Frédéric Thomas
- (France) Olivier Thomas
- (France) Olivier Thomert
- (Belgium) Patrick Van Kets
- (France) Alexandre Vardin
- (France) Stéphen Vincent
- (Algeria) Hassan Yebda
- (Ivory Coast) Zito

== Coaching staff ==
Position	Staff
Head coach	(France) Patrick Videira
Assistant coach	(France) Alexis Baudet
Goalkeeper coach	(France) Johan Liébus
Fitness coach	(France) Nolan Martin
Conditioning coach	(France) Jérémie Collon
Video analyst	(France) Camille Coudé

== Former managers ==
- Mony Braustein (1945–46)
- ? (1946–47)
- Émile Rummelhardt (1947–51)
- Gaston Choulet (1951–52)
- Gabriel Corsaletti (1952–53)
- Camille Libar (1953–57)
- André Grillon (1957–64)
- René Dereuddre (1964–76)
- Alain Laurier (1976–79)
- Michel Rodriguez (1979–81)
- André Guttierez (1981–85)
- Bernard Deferrez (1985–86)
- Christian Gourcuff (Jun 86 – Jan 89)
- Christian Létard (Jan 1989 – Jan 94)
- Thierry Froger (Jan 1994 – May 97)
- Slavo Muslin (Jun 1997 – Nov 97)
- Marc Westerloppe (Nov 1997 – Nov 2000)
- Alain Pascalou (Nov 2000 – Dec 2000)
- Thierry Goudet (Dec 2000 – Feb 2004)
- Daniel Jeandupeux (Feb 2004 – Dec 2004)
- Frédéric Hantz (Dec 2004–07)
- Rudi Garcia (2007–08)
- Yves Bertucci (2008–09)
- Daniel Jeandupeux (2009)
- Arnaud Cormier (2009)
- Paulo Duarte (2009)
- Arnaud Cormier (2009–2011)
- Denis Zanko (2011–2013)
- Régis Beunardeau (2013)
- Stéphane Guédet (2013–2014)
- Alexandre Clément (2014–2015)
- Richard Déziré (2015–2020)
- Réginald Ray (2020)
- Didier Ollé-Nicolle (2020–2021)
- Cris (2021–2022)

== Honours ==
- Division d'Honneur Ouest
  - Winners: 1961, 1965
- Division d'Honneur Maine
  - Winners: 2014
- Coupe Gambardella
  - Winners: 2004
