= Patrick Videira =

French football manager (born 1977)

Personal information
- Date of birth: 26 April 1977 (age 49)
- Place of birth: Paris, France
- Position: Midfielder

Team information
- Current team: Le Mans (head coach)

Youth career
- Paris Saint-Germain

Senior career*
Years	Team	Apps	(Gls)
1995–1996	Paris Saint-Germain B		
1996–1997	Chaves	5	(0)
1998–2000	Maia	27	(0)
2000–2001	Ermesinde	15	(1)
2001–2002	Martigues	17	(0)
2002–2004	Cannes		
2004–2005	Rodez	26	(0)
2005–2006	Nîmes	8	(1)
2006–2007	Avignon		
2007–2011	Gardanne		
2011–2014	Martigues B		
2014–2015	Marignane Gignac CB		
2015–2016	Istres		

Managerial career
- 2016–2018: Istres (assistant)
- 2018–2024: Furiani-Agliani
- 2024–: Le Mans
- * Club domestic league appearances and goals

Patrick Videira (born 26 April 1977) is a French football coach and a former player who is the head coach of Ligue 1 club Le Mans.

== Playing career ==
In 1996, Videira signed for Chaves in the Portuguese top flight from the reserves of Paris Saint-Germain. After being rarely used, he moved to second division side Maia in January 1998.

In 2000, Videira signed for Ermesinde in the Portuguese third division, and returned to his home country with Martigues in the following year. In 2004, after two years at Cannes, he signed for Rodez in the fourth division, where he survived a plane crash on the way to a game against Bastia.

Videira resumed his career in the lower leagues of French football, representing Avignon, Gardanne, Martigues B, Marignane Gignac Côte Bleue and Istres. He retired with the latter in 2016, aged 39.

== Managerial career ==
Immediately after retiring, Videira took up coaching at his last club Istres, working as an assistant. On 29 June 2018, he was appointed manager of Furiani-Agliani in the Championnat National 3, and led the club to a promotion in 2022.

On 30 May 2024, Videira was announced as manager of Championnat National side Le Mans. He led the side to two consecutive promotions, and renewed his contract until 2029 on 12 June 2026.
