= Stade Marie-Marvingt =

Stadium in Le Mans, France

Coordinates: 47.959°N 0.2234°E

- Interactive map of Stade Marie-Marvingt
- Address: Chemin aux Bœufs
- Location: Le Mans, France
- Owner: Ville du Mans
- Capacity: Football: 25,064; Concerts: 40,000
- Surface: Grass

Construction
- Groundbreaking: August 18, 2008
- Opened: January 29, 2011
- Cost: €102 million
- Architects: Cardete et Huet Architectures; Studio Bruno Huet

Tenant
- Le Mans FC (2010–present)

Website
- stademariemarvingt.com

The Stade Marie-Marvingt (previously MMArena) is a multi-use stadium in Le Mans, France, that opened in January 2011. It is used mostly for football matches and hosted the home matches of Le Mans FC. The stadium has a capacity of 25,064 people. It replaced the Stade Léon-Bollée as the club's stadium.

The arena is located inside the Circuit de la Sarthe, home of the famous 24 Hours of Le Mans, and adjacent the first right kink on the Mulsanne Straight.
