= 2026–27 Le Havre AC season =

Le Havre AC
2026–27 season
- Head coach: Didier Digard
- Stadium: Stade Océane
- Ligue 1: 16th
- Top goalscorer: League: Mbwana Samatta; Rayan Fofana (1 each); All: Mbwana Samatta; Rayan Fofana (1 each)
- Highest home attendance: 18,956
- Lowest home attendance: 15,984
- Average home league attendance: 17,470
Home colours	Away colours	Third colours

The 2026–27 season was the 133rd season in the history of Le Havre AC, and the club's fourth consecutive season in Ligue 1. In addition to the domestic league, the club participated in the Coupe de France.

== Players ==
=== First-team squad ===
As of 8 September 2026

No.	Pos.	Nation	Player
5	DF	ALG	Ahmed Touba (on loan from Panathinaikos)
6	MF	FRA	Junior Mwanga
7	MF	MAR	Amir Richardson (on loan from Fiorentina)
9	FW	NGR	Josh Maja
10	MF	SUI	Felix Mambimbi
12	DF	DEN	Elias Jelert (on loan from Galatasaray)
14	MF	SEN	Rassoul Ndiaye
15	DF	JPN	Ayumu Seko
17	MF	JPN	Kaito Mizuta
19	FW	FRA	Joan Tincres
20	DF	FRA	Djibril Ouziad
23	DF	FRA	Vincent Sasso
24	MF	CIV	Guy-Noël Zohouri

No.	Pos.	Nation	Player
25	FW	TAN	Mbwana Samatta
26	MF	FRA	Simon Ebonog
27	FW	FRA	Enzo Koffi
29	DF	FRA	Stephan Zagadou
30	FW	JPN	Sōta Nakamura (on loan from Sanfrecce Hiroshima)
32	DF	FRA	Timothée Pembélé
38	FW	CIV	Rayan Fofana (on loan from Lens)
44	MF	FRA	Ismaïl Bouneb
50	GK	FRA	Paul Argney
77	GK	COD	Lionel Mpasi
78	MF	FRA	Daren Mosengo
93	GK	FRA	Gauthier Gallon
—	FW	FRA	Élysée Logbo

=== Out on loan ===
Note: Flags indicate national team as defined under FIFA eligibility rules; some limited exceptions apply. Players may hold more than one non-FIFA nationality.

No.	Pos.	Nation	Player
—	FW	FRA	Noam Obougou (at Nancy until 30 June 2027)

== Transfers ==
=== In ===
Pos.	Player	Transferred from	Fee	Date	Source
MF	(Japan) Kaito Mizuta	(Germany) Rot-Weiss Essen	Free	7 July 2026	
DF	(France) Vincent Sasso	(France) USL Dunkerque	Free	13 July 2026	
DF	(France) Timothée Pembélé	(England) Sunderland	Free	16 July 2026	
FW	(Japan) Sōta Nakamura	(Japan) Sanfrecce Hiroshima	Loan	17 July 2026	
MF	(Morocco) Amir Richardson	(Italy) Fiorentina	Loan	18 July 2026	
DF	(France) Junior Mwanga	(France) Strasbourg	€1,500,000	29 July 2026	
FW	(France) Joan Tincres	(France) AS Monaco II	Free	31 July 2026	
FW	(Nigeria) Josh Maja	(England) West Bromwich Albion	Free	31 July 2026	
DF	(Denmark) Elias Jelert	(Turkey) Galatasaray	Loan	21 August 2026	
GK	(France) Gauthier Gallon	(Belgium) Dender EH	Free	26 August 2026	
DF	(Algeria) Ahmed Touba	(Greece) Panathinaikos	Loan	27 August 2026	

=== Out ===
Pos.	Player	Transferred to	Fee	Date	Source
DF	(France) Gautier Lloris	(France) Brest	Free	12 August 2026	
DF	(France) Noam Obougou	(France) Nancy	Loan	12 August 2026	
GK	(Senegal) Mory Diaw	(Saudi Arabia) Al Shabab Club	€1,000,000	24 August 2026	
MF	(Algeria) Mokrane Bentoumi	(Netherlands) Roda JC	Undisclosed	26 August 2026	
DF	(France) Yanis Zouaoui	(France) Montpellier	Free	28 August 2026	
DF	(Mali) Fodé Doucouré	(France) Nantes	Undisclosed	1 September 2026	
FW	(France) Godson Kyeremeh	(France) Red Star	Undisclosed	1 September 2026	

== Friendlies ==
=== Pre-season ===
17 July 2026 Friendly	Le Havre	1–2	Amiens	Soquence
17:00	Ndiaye 14'	Report	Colin 23'; Doucet 25'	Stadium: Center Drive Du Havre Athletic Clubfootball; Attendance: 0

25 July 2026 Friendly	Le Havre	2–1	Red Star	Soquence
18:00	Doucouré 57'; Zouaoui 83'	Report	Cissé 33'	Stadium: Center Drive Du Havre Athletic Clubfootball

31 July 2026 Friendly	Le Havre	1–1	Laval	Le Havre
11:00	Kyeremeh 24'	Report	Houdayer 19'	Stadium: Stade Océane

4 August 2026 Friendly	Ipswich Town (England)	1–0	(France) Le Havre	Ipswich, England
19:45 BST	Akpom 58'	Report		Stadium: Portman Road; Attendance: 6,669; Referee: Gavin Ward (England)

8 August 2026 Friendly	Real Oviedo (Spain)	3–2	(France) Le Havre	Oviedo, Spain
20:30 CEST (UTC+2)	Lachhab 12'; Reina 21'; Mingo 90+3'	Report	Samatta 8'; Marco Esteban 15'	Stadium: Carlos Tartiere Stadium; Attendance: 3,996; Referee: Andrés Fuentes Molina (Spain)

15 August 2026 Friendly	Le Mans	0–1	Le Havre	Oviedo, Spain
18:00		Report	Doucouré 29'	Stadium: Stade Marie-Marvingt; Attendance: 10,000

== Competitions ==
=== Overall record ===
Competition	First match	Last match	Starting round	Final position	Record							
Competition	First match	Last match	Starting round	Final position	Pld	W	D	L	GF	GA	GD	Win %
Ligue 1	23 August 2026	30 May 2027	Matchday 1	16th	4	0	2	2	2	4	−2	0.00
Coupe de France	December 2026		Round of 64		0	0	0	0	0	0	+0	—
Total					4	0	2	2	2	4	−2	0.00

Source: Soccerway

=== Ligue 1 ===
==== League table ====
Pos	Team	Pld	W	D	L	GF	GA	GD	Pts	Qualification or relegation
14	Auxerre	10	3	1	6	13	24	−11	10	
15	Le Mans	10	1	5	4	12	19	−7	8	
16	Angers	10	2	2	6	9	19	−10	8	Qualification for the relegation play-offs
17	Troyes	10	2	2	6	7	17	−10	8	Relegation to Ligue 2
18	Le Havre	10	0	2	8	9	22	−13	2	Relegation to Ligue 2

Updated to match(es) played on 8 November 2026. Source: Ligue 1
Rules for classification: 1) Points; 2) Goal difference; 3) Head-to-head points; 4) Head-to-head goal difference; 5) Goals scored; 6) Wins; 7) Away wins; 8) Fair-play points; 9) Drawing of lots.
(Note: Head-to-head record is used only after all the matches between the teams in question have been played).

==== Results summary ====
Overall								Home						Away					
Pld	W	D	L	GF	GA	GD	Pts	W	D	L	GF	GA	GD	W	D	L	GF	GA	GD
4	0	2	2	2	4	−2	2	0	1	2	1	3	−2	0	1	0	1	1	0

Source: Ligue 1

==== Results by round ====
Round	1	2	3	4	5	6	7	8	9	10	11	12	13	14	15	16	17	18	19	20	21	22	23	24	25	26	27	28	29	30	31	32	33	34
Ground	H	A	H	H	A	A	H	A	H																									
Result	L	D	L	D																														
Position	14	15	16	16																														

Source: Ligue 1
A = Away; H = Home; W = Win; D = Draw; L = Loss

==== Matches ====
The league schedule was released on 10 June 2026.

Fixture Win Draw Loss

23 August 2026 1	Le Havre	0–1	Monaco	Le Havre
17:15 CEST (UTC+2)	Richardson (yellow card) 20'; Doucouré (yellow card) 34'; Sasso 44'	Report	Eric Dier 14'; Golovin (yellow card) 64'; Vanderson (yellow card) 66'	Stadium: Stade Océane; Attendance: 18,956; Referee: Jérémie Pignard

29 August 2026 2	Lyon	1–1	Le Havre	Lyon
20:45 CEST (UTC+2)	Openda 87'	Report	Seko (yellow card) 41'; Samatta 74'; Doucouré (yellow card) 90+6'	Stadium: Parc Olympique Lyonnais; Attendance: 39,841; Referee: François Letexier

5 September 2026 3	Le Havre	1–2	Brest	Le Havre
20:45 CEST (UTC+2)	Mpasi (yellow card) 10'; Mwanga (red card) 45+2'; Fofana 79' (pen.)	Report	Doumbia 12' (pen.), 51' (yellow card) 39'	Stadium: Stade Océane; Attendance: 15,984; Referee: Marc Bollengier

12 September 2026 4	Le Havre	0–0	Angers	Le Havre
20:45 CEST (UTC+2)	Touba (yellow card) 90+4'	Report	Lefort (yellow card) 32'	Stadium: Stade Océane; Attendance: 15,850; Referee: Ruddy Buquet

19 September 2026 5	Toulouse	3–2	Le Havre	Toulouse
20:45 CEST (UTC+2)		Report		Stadium: Stadium de Toulouse

10 October 2026 6	Lille	1–0	Le Havre	Villeneuve-d'Ascq
17:15 CEST (UTC+2)		Report		Stadium: Stade Pierre-Mauroy

18 October 2026 7	Le Havre	1–3	Auxerre	Le Havre
17:15 CEST (UTC+2)		Report		Stadium: Stade Océane

25 October 2026 8	Marseille	4–3	Le Havre	Marseille
17:15 CET (UTC+1)		Report		Stadium: Stade Vélodrome

30 October 2026 9	Le Havre	v	Paris Saint-Germain	Le Havre
19:00 CET (UTC+1)		Report		Stadium: Stade Océane

=== Coupe de France ===
TBD December 2026 Round of 64	TBD	v	TBD	TBD
TBD CET (UTC+1)				Stadium: TBD
