= Mathis Lainé =

French footballer (born 2007)

Personal information
- Date of birth: 30 March 2007 (age 19)
- Place of birth: Avranches, France
- Height: 1.94 m (6 ft 4 in)
- Position: Forward

Team information
- Current team: Brest
- Number: 32

Youth career
- –2022: Avranches
- 2022–2026: Brest

Senior career*
Years	Team	Apps	(Gls)
2025–	Brest B	26	(5)
2026–	Brest	4	(0)
- * Club domestic league appearances and goals as of 23 October 2026

Mathis Lainé (born 30 March 2007) is a French professional footballer who plays as a forward for Brest.

== Early life ==
Lainé was born on 30 March 2007. Born in Avranches, France, he is a native of the city.

== Career ==
As a youth player, Lainé joined the youth academy of Avranches. Following his stint there, he joined the youth academy of Ligue 1 side Brest after receiving interest from the youth academies of Ligue 1 sides Lorient and Nantes and was promoted to the club's senior team ahead of the 2026–27 season. On 22 August 2026, he debuted for them during a 2–2 away draw with Le Mans in the league.
