= Jean-Marc Nobilo =

French football coach (born 1960)

Jean Marc Nobilo
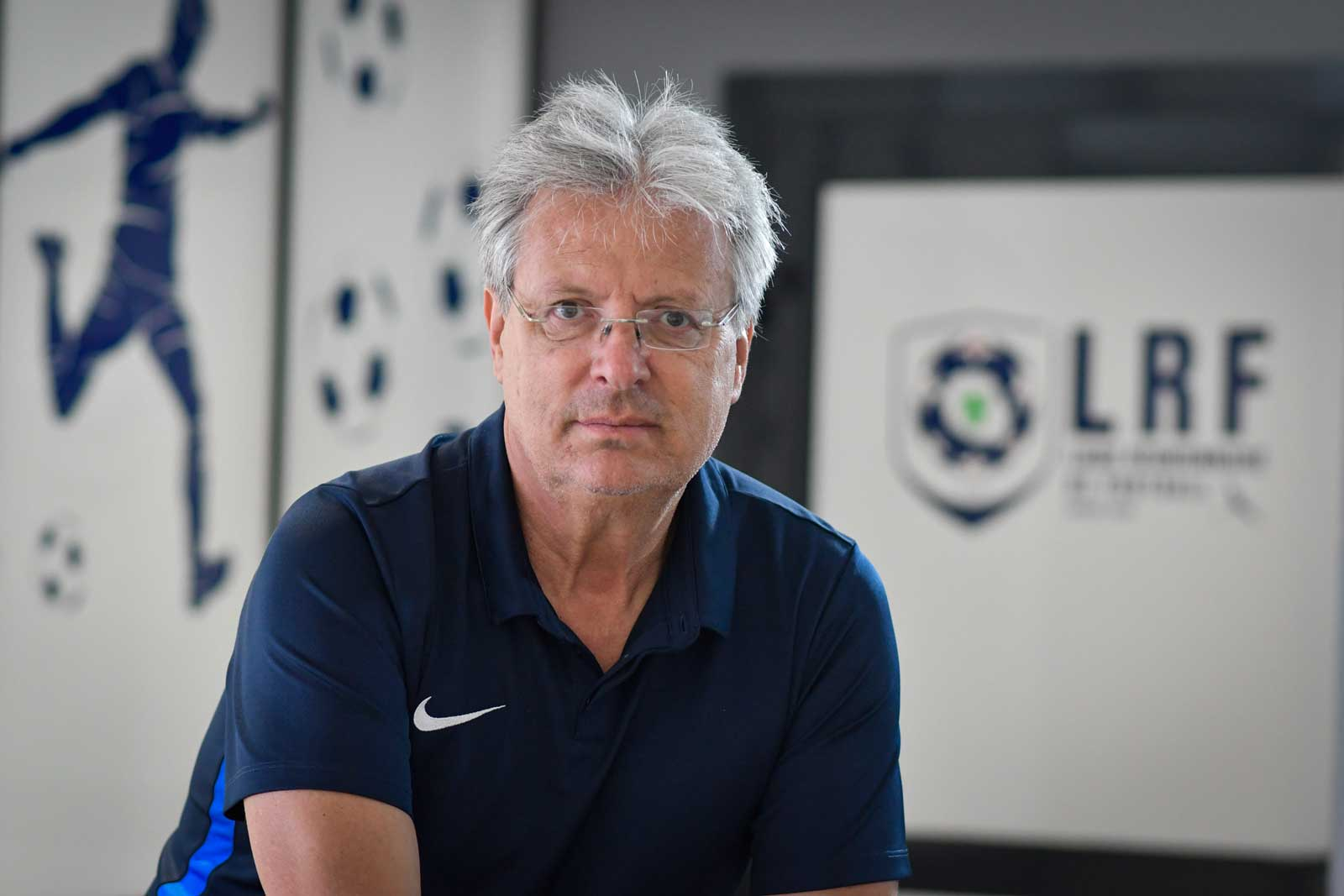

Personal information
- Date of birth: 27 July 1960 (age 66)
- Place of birth: Cahors, France

Team information
- Current team: Paris FC (academy manager)

Senior career*
Years	Team	Apps	(Gls)
1978-1982	Castets-en-Dorthe		
1986–1987	SC Hazebrouck		

Managerial career
- 1988–1991: La Tamponnaise
- 1991–1993: Saint-Denis FC
- 1993–1996: CTD Réunion
- 1996–1999: Le Havre B
- 2001–2002: Al Ain FC
- 2004–2005: Angers B
- 2005–2007: Le Havre B
- 2007–2008: Le Havre
- 2009–2010: Le Havre B
- 2010: Benin
- 2012–2013: Algeria U20
- 2013–2016: Auxerre B
- 2017: Laval
- * Club domestic league appearances and goals

Jean Marc Nobilo (born 27 July 1960) is a French football coach.

Nobilo first started his career as a player at amateur level (French 3rd division). After a brief coaching career at SC Hazebrouck, he became a coach on the Reunion Island at La Tamponnaise, at Saint-Denis FC (with a participation in the quarterfinals of the African Cup in 1993) and then at Le Havre AC (Ligue 2). During his time at Le Havre, he has been coach of the PRO B team, the training facility's head manager. Having won the French League 2 tournament during the season 2007-2008 and being elected the best coach of the league, he helped the club to come back in League 1.

He pursued his career both in France and internationally with a wide variety of experiences: head coach of Benin's national team (finalist of the UMEOA tournament in 2010), National Technical Director to the Ivorian Football Federation (with a participation in the U17 World Cup in Mexico in 2011), head manager of AJ Auxerre's training center (League 2) and winner of the Gambardella Cup U19 in 2014. He is renowned for his capacity to promote PRO B team to the upper division (in 2005 with Angers SCO, in 2007 with Le Havre AC and finally with AJ Auxerre in 2014).

== Biography ==
After working in Reunion, Mauritius Island (as National Technical Director and manager of the U20 and U17 national teams), Lebanon (as National Technical Director and manager of U20, U17 and U15 national teams) and in Al-Aïn (as the training's center head manager), Jean-Marc Nobilo came back in France in 2004 as the first's teams joint coach with Noël Tosi, and head coach of the PRO B team of Angers SCO. His winning the Atlantic League allowed for the PRO B team to be promoted to CFA 2 (5th division).

In 2005, Jean-Pierre Louvel, Chairman of Le Havre AC, offered him the training facility's head manager and head coach of the PRO B Team, in CFA 2 (5th division) positions. Under his leadership, the team was promoted to CFA (fourth division) in 2006.

In 2007, he replaced Thierry Uvenard as head coach of Le Havre AC's first time, then in League 2 (2nd division). The team dominated the championship, won the title two games before the end and was promoted back to League 1 (1st division). Jean-Marc Nobilo was elected best coach of League 2. He renewed his contract with Le Havre AC for two more seasons. But his come back in League 1 was difficult. Last one in ranking in December and after four losses in five games, Jean-Marc Nobilo was appointed sports manager by Louvel. Frederic Hantz, former coach of Sochaux, then replaced him as the new first team's head coach.

By September 2010, Jean-Marc Nobilo was appointed head coach of Benin's national team. He left his job one month later since the salary agreements were not respected.

In February 2011, he was appointed National Technical Director of Ivorian Football Federation and manager of U20 and U17 national teams, by Jacques Anouma (Chairman of the Federation), for two seasons. Under his leadership, the Ivory Coast's U17 national team reached the U17 World Cup's knockout stages in Mexico with coach Alain Gouaméné.

In January 2012, he became head manager of Algeria's youth national team and head coach of U20 national team. He resigned on 23 March 2013, after the elimination of the team during the first phases of the Youth African Cup.

In June 2013, he came back in France as Academy's head manager of AJ Auxerre (League 2). He signed a four-season contract. In 2014, he became head coach of the PRO B team. His team won the CFA 2 (fifth division), promoting them to CFA (fourth division). The next year, the team finished on the podium. Moreover, with Johan Radet (head coach of U19 team), AJ Auxerre won the Gambardella Cup U19, the most famous national youth competition after waiting twelve years.

During the season 2016 – 2017, he became a consultant in Slovakia for the FC DAC Daunajskà (1st division) and special advisor of Chairman Oszkàr VILAGI about youth development.

In June 2017, he became head coach of the first team of Stade Lavallois (3rd division). He left his job on 17 December 2017 as part of an amicable separation.

In June 2018, on the recommendation of National Technical Departement of the French Football Federation, he was appointed local technical director of Reunion Island Football League, by its Chairman, Yves Estheve. Specially in charge of coach education and youth teams (from U13 to U20, males and females).

In 2020, Jean-Marc Nobilo came back in France again and accepted the job employment of Paris FC's Chairman Pierre Ferracci (League 2). He became Academy's head manager and manager of international club development (Bahreïn, Inde).

== Clubs ==
=== Player ===
- 1981-1982 : (France) Castets-en-Dorthe
- 1982-1987 : (France) SC Hazebrouck

=== Coach ===
- 1988 - 1991 : (France) US Stade Tamponnaise La Réunion (Head Coach)
- 1991 - 1993 : (France) CS Saint-Denis La Réunion (Head Coach)
- 1993 - 1996 : (France) Reunion Island (Academy Director / Regional Technical Director)
- 1996 - 1999 : (France) Le Havre AC (PRO B Team Head Coach)
- 1999 - 2001 : Mauricius Island (National Technical Director / U20 National Team Head Coach)
- 2001 - 2002 : United Arab EmiratesAl Aïn (Academy Director)
- 2002 - 2004 : Lebanon (National Technical Director / U20 and U16 National Team Head Coach)
- 2004 - 2005 : (France) Angers SCO (PRO Team Assistant Coach / PRO B Team Head Coach)
- 2005 - 2010 : (France) Le Havre AC (PRO B Team Head Coach / Academy Director / PRO Team Head Coach / Head manager of the club)
- Sep 2010 - Oct. 2010 : Benin (Selection "A" and CHAN Head Coach)
- Fév. 2011 - Oct. 2011 : Ivory Coast (National Technical Director / U20 and U17 National Team Head Coach)
- Jan. 2012 - Mars 2013 : algeria (U20 and U19 National Team Head Coach)
- 2013 - 2017 : (France) AJ Auxerre (Academy Director / PRO B Team Head Coach)
- 2017 - déc. 2017 - : (France) Stade lavallois (PRO Team Head Coach)
- 2018 - 2020 : (France) Ligue Réunionnaise de Football (Regional Technical Director / French Football Association)
- 2020 jusqu'à aujourd'hui : (France) Paris FC (Academy Director)

== Prize list ==
- 2005 - Winner DH (French 6th division) - PRO B Team SCO d'Angers (France)
- 2006 - Winner of the tournament of French Elite Academies - PRO B Team Havre AC (France)
- 2007 - Winner CFA 2 (French 5th division) - PRO B Team Havre AC (France)
- 2008 - Winner League 2 (French 2nd division) - PRO Team Havre AC (France) and elected best coach of the league (Trophées UNFP)
- 2010 - French Vice - Champion of PRO B Teams - PRO B Team Havre AC (France)
- 2011 - Round of 16 of the World Cup U17 in Mexico - National Team U17 Ivory Coast
- 2014 - Winner of the famous Gambardella Cup (U19 French National Cup) - U19 AJ Auxerre (France)
- 2015 - Winner of CFA 2 (French 5th division) - PRO B Team AJ Auxerre (France) and elected best coach of the league
- 2016 - On the podium of CFA (French 4th division) - PRO B Team AJ Auxerre (France)
