= Zagadou =

Zagadou is an Ivorian surname. Notable people with the surname include:

- Dan-Axel Zagadou (born 1999), French footballer
- Stephan Zagadou (born 2008), French footballer
