= 2026–27 in French football =

Football in France
- Season: 2026–27

Men's football
- Super Cup: Lens

The following article is a summary of the 2026–27 football season in France, which was the 93rd season of competitive football in the country and ran from July 2026 to June 2027.

== National team ==
=== France national football team ===
==== 2026–27 UEFA Nations League ====
===== League A Group 1 =====
Pos	Team	Pld	W	D	L	GF	GA	GD	Pts	Qualification or relegation	(France)	(Belgium)	(Italy)	(Turkey)
1	France	6	4	1	1	10	6	+4	13	Advance to quarter-finals	—	4–1	1–1	2–1
2	Belgium	6	4	0	2	12	7	+5	12	Advance to quarter-finals	0–1	—	4–1	3–0
3	Italy	6	3	1	2	12	10	+2	10		3–1	0–2	—	3–1
4	Turkey (R)	6	0	0	6	4	15	−11	0	Relegated to League B	0–1	1–2	1–4	—

Source: UEFA
Rules for classification: Tiebreakers
(R) Relegated

25 September 2026 MD 1	Turkey	0–1	France	Kocaeli, Turkey
20:45 UTC+2		Report	Mbappé 54'	Stadium: Kocaeli Stadium; Attendance: 28,205; Referee: Felix Zwayer (Germany)

28 September 2026 MD 2	Belgium	0–1	France	Brussels, Belgium
20:45 UTC+2		Report	Olise 88'	Stadium: King Baudouin Stadium; Attendance: 40,857; Referee: Rade Obrenovič (Slovenia)

2 October 2026 MD 3	France	1–1	Italy	Saint-Denis, France
20:45 UTC+2	Olise 55'	Report	Bastoni 68'	Stadium: Stade de France; Attendance: 77,118; Referee: Jesús Gil Manzano (Spain)

5 October 2026 MD 4	France	4–1	Belgium	Saint-Denis, France
20:45 UTC+2	Doue 77'; Cherki 81'; Olise 88', 90+1'	Report	Lukebakio 35'	Stadium: Stade de France; Attendance: 75,389; Referee: Nicholas Walsh (Scotland)

12 November 2026 MD 5	Italy	3–1	France	Milan, Italy
20:45 UTC+1	P. Esposito 26', 75' (pen.); Frattesi 63'	Report	Olise 10'	Stadium: San Siro; Attendance: 71,452; Referee: István Kovács (Romania)

15 November 2026 MD 6	France	2–1	Turkey	Bordeaux, France
20:45 UTC+1	Topçu 49' (o.g.); Kroupi 80'	Report	Bardakcı 90'	Stadium: Stade Atlantique; Attendance: 40,033; Referee: Chris Kavanagh (England)

===== Quarter-finals =====
Team 1	Agg.	Team 2	1st leg	2nd leg
Spain		France	25 Mar	28 Mar

25 March 2027 Quarter-finals	Spain	v	France
		Report

28 March 2027 Quarter-finals	France	v	Spain
		Report

=== France women's national football team ===
==== Friendlies ====
10 October 2026	France	9–0	Latvia	Laval
21:00	Diani 9'; Le Moguédec 12', 40'; Malard 20'; Geyoro 31'; Hurtré 45+1'; Gago 59'; Mateo 66'; Katoto 82'	Report		Stadium: Stade Francis Le Basser; Attendance: 7,434; Referee: Stacey Pearson (England)

27 November 2026	France	v	Venezuela	Tomblaine
21:00		Report		Stadium: Stade Marcel Picot

1 December 2026	TBD	v	France
		Report

5 December 2026	France	v	Morocco	Montbéliard
21:10		Report		Stadium: Stade Auguste-Bonal

== UEFA competitions ==
=== UEFA Super Cup ===
12 August 2026
21:00 UTC+2

Paris Saint-Germain (France)	2–1	(England) Aston Villa
Kvaratskhelia 20'; Doué 61'	Report	Madjo 45'

Red Bull Arena, Salzburg
Attendance: 27,681
Referee: Omar Artan (Somalia)

=== UEFA Champions League ===
==== Third qualifying round ====
Team 1	Agg.	Team 2	1st leg	2nd leg
Sparta Prague (Czech Republic)	2–4	(France) Lyon	2–1	0–3

==== Play-off round ====
Team 1	Agg.	Team 2	1st leg	2nd leg
Fenerbahçe (Turkey)	3–2	(France) Lyon	1–1	2–1

==== League phase ====
===== Lens =====
Pos	Team	Pld	W	D	L	GF	GA	GD	Pts
31	(Azerbaijan) Sabah	4	1	0	3	4	10	−6	3
32	(Netherlands) Feyenoord	4	1	0	3	4	11	−7	3
33	(France) Lens	4	1	0	3	4	16	−12	3
34	(Czech Republic) Slavia Prague	4	0	1	3	5	9	−4	1
35	(France) Lille	4	0	1	3	4	10	−6	1

Updated to match(es) played on 4 November 2026. Source: UEFA
Rules for classification: League phase tiebreakers

Home team	Score	Away team
Slavia Prague (Czech Republic)	2–3	(France) Lens
Lens (France)	0–2	(Portugal) Sporting CP
Club Brugge (Belgium)	3–0	(France) Lens
Lens (France)	1–9	(Italy) Como
RB Leipzig (Germany)	24 Nov	(France) Lens
Lens (France)	9 Dec	(Norway) Bodø/Glimt
Lens (France)	20 Jan	(England) Manchester City
Liverpool (England)	27 Jan	(France) Lens

===== Lille =====
Pos	Team	Pld	W	D	L	GF	GA	GD	Pts
32	(Netherlands) Feyenoord	4	1	0	3	4	11	−7	3
33	(France) Lens	4	1	0	3	4	16	−12	3
34	(Czech Republic) Slavia Prague	4	0	1	3	5	9	−4	1
35	(France) Lille	4	0	1	3	4	10	−6	1
36	(Slovakia) Slovan Bratislava	4	0	0	4	1	17	−16	0

Updated to match(es) played on 4 November 2026. Source: UEFA
Rules for classification: League phase tiebreakers

Home team	Score	Away team
Lille (France)	2–3	(Spain) Real Betis
Arsenal (England)	3–0	(France) Lille
Lille (France)	2–4	(Turkey) Galatasaray
Bodø/Glimt (Norway)	0–0	(France) Lille
Lille (France)	25 Nov	(Germany) Bayern Munich
VfB Stuttgart (Germany)	9 Dec	(France) Lille
Lille (France)	19 Jan	(Slovakia) Slovan Bratislava
Roma (Italy)	27 Jan	(France) Lille

===== Paris Saint-Germain =====
Pos	Team	Pld	W	D	L	GF	GA	GD	Pts	Qualification
1	(France) Paris Saint-Germain	4	4	0	0	20	5	+15	12	Advance to round of 16 (seeded)
2	(Spain) Real Madrid	4	4	0	0	13	7	+6	12	Advance to round of 16 (seeded)
3	(England) Arsenal	4	3	1	0	8	3	+5	10	Advance to round of 16 (seeded)
4	(Italy) Como	4	3	0	1	19	6	+13	9	Advance to round of 16 (seeded)
5	(Spain) Barcelona	4	3	0	1	14	6	+8	9	Advance to round of 16 (seeded)

Updated to match(es) played on 4 November 2026. Source: UEFA
Rules for classification: League phase tiebreakers

Home team	Score	Away team
Paris Saint-Germain (France)	6–1	(Slovakia) Slovan Bratislava
Manchester City (England)	2–4	(France) Paris Saint Germain
Paris Saint-Germain (France)	4–2	(Spain) Barcelona
Villarreal (Spain)	0–6	(France) Paris Saint-Germain
Paris Saint-Germain (France)	25 Nov	(Italy) Roma
Aston Villa (England)	8 Dec	(France) Paris Saint-Germain
Como (Italy)	20 Jan	(France) Paris Saint-Germain
Paris Saint-Germain (France)	27 Jan	(Turkey) Galatasaray

=== UEFA Europa League ===
==== League phase ====
===== Lyon =====
Pos	Team	Pld	W	D	L	GF	GA	GD	Pts	Qualification
11	(England) Sunderland	4	2	1	1	4	4	0	7	Advance to knockout phase play-offs (seeded)
12	(Netherlands) NEC	4	2	1	1	8	9	−1	7	Advance to knockout phase play-offs (seeded)
13	(France) Lyon	4	2	1	1	6	7	−1	7	Advance to knockout phase play-offs (seeded)
14	(Netherlands) AZ	4	2	0	2	7	4	+3	6	Advance to knockout phase play-offs (seeded)
15	(Belgium) Anderlecht	4	2	0	2	6	3	+3	6	Advance to knockout phase play-offs (seeded)

Updated to match(es) played on 5 November 2026. Source: UEFA
Rules for classification: League phase tiebreakers

Home team	Score	Away team
Anderlecht (Belgium)	1–2	(France) Lyon
Lyon (France)	3–2	(England) Crystal Palace
TSG Hoffenheim (Germany)	3–0	(France) Lyon
Real Sociedad (Spain)	1–1	(France) Lyon
Lyon (France)	26 Nov	(Norway) Lillestrøm
Lyon (France)	10 Dec	(Belgium) Union Saint-Gilloise
Jagiellonia Białystok (Poland)	21 Jan	(France) Lyon
Lyon (France)	28 Jan	(Germany) Bayer Leverkusen

===== Marseille =====
Pos	Team	Pld	W	D	L	GF	GA	GD	Pts
29	(Poland) Jagiellonia Białystok	4	1	0	3	4	7	−3	3
30	(Czech Republic) Viktoria Plzeň	4	1	0	3	3	7	−4	3
31	(France) Marseille	4	1	0	3	2	6	−4	3
32	(Scotland) Celtic	4	1	0	3	6	11	−5	3
33	(Israel) Hapoel Be'er Sheva	4	0	1	3	1	8	−7	1

Updated to match(es) played on 5 November 2026. Source: UEFA
Rules for classification: League phase tiebreakers

Home team	Score	Away team
Beşiktaş (Turkey)	4–1	(France) Marseille
Marseille (France)	0–1	(Greece) Olympiacos
Sturm Graz (Austria)	1–0	(France) Marseille
Bayer Leverkusen (Germany)	0–1	(France) Marseille
Marseille (France)	26 Nov	(Bulgaria) Levski Sofia
Marseille (France)	10 Dec	(Spain) Celta Vigo
Celtic (Scotland)	21 Jan	(France) Marseille
Marseille (France)	28 Jan	(Belgium) Anderlecht

===== Rennes =====
Pos	Team	Pld	W	D	L	GF	GA	GD	Pts	Qualification
15	(Belgium) Anderlecht	4	2	0	2	6	3	+3	6	Advance to knockout phase play-offs (seeded)
16	(Greece) OFI	4	2	0	2	5	4	+1	6	Advance to knockout phase play-offs (seeded)
17	(France) Rennes	4	1	3	0	4	3	+1	6	Advance to knockout phase play-offs (unseeded)
18	(Cyprus) Omonia	4	2	0	2	6	7	−1	6	Advance to knockout phase play-offs (unseeded)
19	(Portugal) Torreense	4	2	0	2	7	9	−2	6	Advance to knockout phase play-offs (unseeded)

Updated to match(es) played on 5 November 2026. Source: UEFA
Rules for classification: League phase tiebreakers

Home team	Score	Away team
Sturm Graz (Austria)	0–0	(France) Rennes
Rennes (France)	2–1	(Greece) OFI
Juventus (Italy)	2–2	(France) Rennes
Rennes (France)	0–0	(Greece) Olympiacos
NEC (Netherlands)	26 Nov	(France) Rennes
Rennes (France)	10 Dec	(Croatia) Dinamo Zagreb
Rennes (France)	21 Jan	(Cyprus) Omonia
Sparta Prague (Czech Republic)	28 Jan	(France) Rennes

=== UEFA Conference League ===
==== Play-off round ====
Team 1	Agg.	Team 2	1st leg	2nd leg
Górnik Zabrze (Poland)	3–7	(France) Monaco	2–3	1–4

==== League phase ====
===== Monaco =====
Pos	Team	Pld	W	D	L	GF	GA	GD	Pts	Qualification
2	(Greece) Panathinaikos	3	3	0	0	9	3	+6	9	Advance to round of 16 (seeded)
3	(Netherlands) Twente	3	3	0	0	8	2	+6	9	Advance to round of 16 (seeded)
4	(France) Monaco	3	3	0	0	7	1	+6	9	Advance to round of 16 (seeded)
5	(England) Brighton & Hove Albion	3	2	1	0	5	0	+5	7	Advance to round of 16 (seeded)
6	(Norway) Brann	3	2	1	0	7	3	+4	7	Advance to round of 16 (seeded)

Updated to match(es) played on 5 November 2026. Source: UEFA
Rules for classification: League phase tiebreakers

Home team	Score	Away team
CSKA Sofia (Bulgaria)	1–2	(France) Monaco
Monaco (France)	3–0	(Germany) SC Freiburg
Monaco (France)	2–0	(Denmark) Nordsjælland
Heart of Midlothian (Scotland)	26 Nov	(France) Monaco
Brighton & Hove Albion (England)	10 Dec	(France) Monaco
Monaco (France)	17 Dec	(Gibraltar) Lincoln Red Imps

=== UEFA Women's Champions League ===
==== Qualifying round ====
===== Third qualifying round =====
Third qualifying round
Team 1	Agg.	Team 2	1st leg	2nd leg
Eintracht Frankfurt (Germany)	2–6	(France) Paris Saint-Germain	1–1	1–5 (a.e.t.)

==== League stage ====
===== Lyon =====
Pos	Team	Pld	W	D	L	GF	GA	GD	Pts	Qualification
1	(Royal Spanish Football Federation) Barcelona (Q)	5	4	1	0	26	3	+23	13	Advance to the quarter-finals (seeded)
2	(French Football Federation) OL Lyonnes (Q)	5	4	1	0	22	0	+22	13	Advance to the quarter-finals (seeded)
3	(German Football Association) Bayern Munich (T)	5	3	2	0	13	5	+8	11	Advance to the quarter-finals (seeded)
4	(The Football Association) Chelsea (T)	5	3	2	0	4	0	+4	11	Advance to the quarter-finals (seeded)
5	(The Football Association) Manchester City (T)	5	2	3	0	10	5	+5	9 (Note: Ranked based on away goals scored, Manchester City 8, Real Madrid 3)	Advance to the knockout phase play-offs (seeded)

Updated to match(es) played on 19 November 2026. Source: UEFA
Rules for classification: League phase tiebreakers
(Q) Qualified for the phase indicated; (T) Qualified, but not yet for the particular phase indicated
Notes:

Home team	Score	Away team
Servette Chênois (Switzerland)	0–8	(France) OL Lyonnes
OL Lyonnes (France)	0–0	(England) Chelsea
OL Lyonnes (France)	6–0	(Italy) Inter Milan
Juventus (Italy)	0–6	(France) OL Lyonnes
Arsenal (England)	19 Nov	(France) OL Lyonnes
OL Lyonnes (France)	16 Dec	(Sweden) BK Häcken

===== Paris FC =====
Pos	Team	Pld	W	D	L	GF	GA	GD	Pts	Qualification
10	(Portuguese Football Federation) Benfica	5	2	0	3	7	11	−4	6	Advance to the knockout phase play-offs (unseeded)
11	(French Football Federation) Paris Saint-Germain	5	1	2	2	8	5	+3	5	Advance to the knockout phase play-offs (unseeded)
12	(French Football Federation) Paris FC	5	1	2	2	7	12	−5	5	Advance to the knockout phase play-offs (unseeded)
13	(Danish Football Association) HB Køge	5	1	1	3	7	13	−6	4	
14	(Italian Football Federation) Inter Milan	5	1	1	3	4	14	−10	4	

Updated to match(es) played on 19 November 2026. Source: UEFA
Rules for classification: League phase tiebreakers

Home team	Score	Away team
Barcelona (Spain)	5–2	(France) Paris FC
Paris FC (France)	2–2	(England) Arsenal
Paris FC (France)	1–1	(Sweden) BK Häcken
Real Madrid (Spain)	3–0	(France) Paris FC
Paris FC (France)	19 Nov	(Denmark) HB Køge
Servette Chênois (Switzerland)	16 Dec	(France) Paris FC

===== Paris Saint-Germain =====
Pos	Team	Pld	W	D	L	GF	GA	GD	Pts	Qualification
9	(Italian Football Federation) Roma	5	2	1	2	5	11	−6	7	Advance to the knockout phase play-offs (unseeded)
10	(Portuguese Football Federation) Benfica	5	2	0	3	7	11	−4	6	Advance to the knockout phase play-offs (unseeded)
11	(French Football Federation) Paris Saint-Germain	5	1	2	2	8	5	+3	5	Advance to the knockout phase play-offs (unseeded)
12	(French Football Federation) Paris FC	5	1	2	2	7	12	−5	5	Advance to the knockout phase play-offs (unseeded)
13	(Danish Football Association) HB Køge	5	1	1	3	7	13	−6	4	

Updated to match(es) played on 19 November 2026. Source: UEFA
Rules for classification: League phase tiebreakers

Home team	Score	Away team
Real Madrid (Spain)	1–1	(France) Paris Saint-Germain
Paris Saint-Germain (France)	5–0	(Belgium) OH Leuven
Manchester City (England)	1–1	(France) Paris Saint-Germain
Paris Saint-Germain (France)	1–2	(Germany) Bayern Munich
Chelsea (England)	18 Nov	(France) Paris Saint-Germain
Paris Saint-Germain (France)	16 Dec	(Italy) Juventus

=== UEFA Youth League ===
==== UEFA Champions League Path ====
===== Lens =====
Pos	Team	Pld	W	D	L	GF	GA	GD	Pts	Qualification
14	(Portugal) Sporting CP	4	2	1	1	9	7	+2	7	Advance to knockout phase
15	(France) Lille	4	2	1	1	7	5	+2	7	Advance to knockout phase
16	(France) Lens	4	2	0	2	8	9	−1	6	Advance to knockout phase
17	(Spain) Real Betis	4	1	2	1	8	6	+2	5	Advance to knockout phase
18	(Spain) Barcelona	4	1	2	1	6	6	0	5	Advance to knockout phase

Updated to match(es) played on 4 November 2026. Source: UEFA
Rules for classification: League phase tiebreakers

Home team	Score	Away team
Slavia Prague (Czech Republic)	2–1	(France) Lens
Lens (France)	3–2	(Portugal) Sporting CP
Club Brugge (Belgium)	4–2	(France) Lens
Lens (France)	2–1	(Italy) Como
RB Leipzig (Germany)	24 Nov	(France) Lens
Lens (France)	9 Dec	(Norway) Bodø/Glimt

===== Lille =====
Pos	Team	Pld	W	D	L	GF	GA	GD	Pts	Qualification
13	(Belgium) Club Brugge	4	2	1	1	12	9	+3	7	Advance to knockout phase
14	(Portugal) Sporting CP	4	2	1	1	9	7	+2	7	Advance to knockout phase
15	(France) Lille	4	2	1	1	7	5	+2	7	Advance to knockout phase
16	(France) Lens	4	2	0	2	8	9	−1	6	Advance to knockout phase
17	(Spain) Real Betis	4	1	2	1	8	6	+2	5	Advance to knockout phase

Updated to match(es) played on 4 November 2026. Source: UEFA
Rules for classification: League phase tiebreakers

Home team	Score	Away team
Lille (France)	0–0	(Spain) Real Betis
Arsenal (England)	2–3	(France) Lille
Lille (France)	3–1	(Turkey) Galatasaray
Bodø/Glimt (Norway)	2–1	(France) Lille
Lille (France)	25 Nov	(Germany) Bayern Munich
VfB Stuttgart (Germany)	9 Dec	(France) Lille

===== Paris Saint-Germain =====
Pos	Team	Pld	W	D	L	GF	GA	GD	Pts	Qualification
10	(Germany) Borussia Dortmund	4	2	1	1	11	5	+6	7	Advance to knockout phase
11	(Italy) Roma	4	2	1	1	10	4	+6	7	Advance to knockout phase
12	(France) Paris Saint-Germain	4	2	1	1	9	5	+4	7	Advance to knockout phase
13	(Belgium) Club Brugge	4	2	1	1	12	9	+3	7	Advance to knockout phase
14	(Portugal) Sporting CP	4	2	1	1	9	7	+2	7	Advance to knockout phase

Updated to match(es) played on 4 November 2026. Source: UEFA
Rules for classification: League phase tiebreakers

Home team	Score	Away team
Paris Saint-Germain (France)	6–1	(Slovakia) Slovan Bratislava
Manchester City (England)	0–2	(France) Paris Saint-Germain
Paris Saint-Germain (France)	1–1	(Spain) Barcelona
Villarreal (Spain)	3–0	(France) Paris Saint-Germain
Paris Saint-Germain (France)	25 Nov	(Italy) Roma
Aston Villa (England)	8 Dec	(France) Paris Saint-Germain

==== Domestic Champions Path ====
===== Second round =====
Team 1	Agg.	Team 2	1st leg	2nd leg
Legia Warsaw (Poland)	5–2	(France) Clermont	3–1	2–1

== League season ==
=== Men ===
==== Ligue 1 ====
Pos	Team	Pld	W	D	L	GF	GA	GD	Pts	Qualification or relegation
1	Paris Saint-Germain	10	7	2	1	22	10	+12	23	Qualification for the Champions League league phase
2	Lille	10	6	3	1	14	7	+7	21	Qualification for the Champions League league phase
3	Paris FC	10	6	2	2	17	10	+7	20	Qualification for the Champions League league phase
4	Marseille	10	6	0	4	22	14	+8	18	Qualification for the Champions League third qualifying round
5	Lyon	10	5	2	3	15	9	+6	17	Qualification for the Europa League league phase (Note: The 2026–27 Coupe de France winners also qualify for the Europa League league phase (or the sixth-placed team if the Coupe de France winners finish in the top five). If the Coupe de France winners finish in the top six, the Conference League spot will be passed to the seventh-placed team.)
6	Nice	10	5	2	3	15	12	+3	17	Qualification for the Conference League play-off round
7	Monaco	10	4	4	2	13	11	+2	16	
8	Rennes	10	5	1	4	21	21	0	16	
9	Brest	10	4	3	3	18	12	+6	15	
10	Lorient	10	4	3	3	9	8	+1	15	
11	Lens	10	4	1	5	17	15	+2	13	
12	Toulouse	10	3	4	3	15	14	+1	13	
13	Strasbourg	10	3	1	6	18	22	−4	10	
14	Auxerre	10	3	1	6	13	24	−11	10	
15	Le Mans	10	1	5	4	12	19	−7	8	
16	Angers	10	2	2	6	9	19	−10	8	Qualification for the relegation play-offs
17	Troyes	10	2	2	6	7	17	−10	8	Relegation to Ligue 2
18	Le Havre	10	0	2	8	9	22	−13	2	Relegation to Ligue 2

Updated to match(es) played on 8 November 2026. Source: Ligue 1
Rules for classification: 1) Points; 2) Goal difference; 3) Head-to-head points; 4) Head-to-head goal difference; 5) Goals scored; 6) Wins; 7) Away wins; 8) Fair-play points; 9) Drawing of lots.
(Note: Head-to-head record is used only after all the matches between the teams in question have been played).

==== Ligue 2 ====
Pos	Team	Pld	W	D	L	GF	GA	GD	Pts	Promotion or Relegation
1	Saint-Étienne	12	9	1	2	25	11	+14	28	Promotion to Ligue 1
2	Nancy	12	8	1	3	17	9	+8	25	Promotion to Ligue 1
3	Montpellier	12	7	3	2	18	9	+9	24	Qualification for promotion play-off semi-final
4	Reims	12	5	6	1	24	15	+9	21	Qualification for promotion play-off quarter-final
5	Pau	12	6	2	4	16	13	+3	20	Qualification for promotion play-off quarter-final
6	Dijon	12	5	3	4	21	19	+2	18	
7	Metz	12	4	5	3	20	19	+1	17	
8	Red Star	12	5	2	5	14	17	−3	17	
9	Annecy	12	5	1	6	14	18	−4	16	
10	Dunkerque	12	4	3	5	17	17	0	15	
11	Guingamp	12	4	2	6	16	18	−2	14	
12	Boulogne	12	2	7	3	10	8	+2	13	
13	Rodez	12	4	1	7	17	23	−6	13	
14	Nantes	12	3	3	6	14	18	−4	12	
15	Clermont	12	1	8	3	11	15	−4	11	
16	Sochaux	12	2	5	5	8	15	−7	11	Qualification for relegation play-off
17	Grenoble	12	3	2	7	13	22	−9	11	Relegation to Ligue 3
18	Laval	12	2	3	7	14	23	−9	9	Relegation to Ligue 3

Updated to match(es) played on 7 November 2026. Source: Ligue 2
Rules for classification: 1) Points; 2) Goal difference; 3) Number of goals scored; 4) Head-to-head goal difference; 5) Fair play points

==== Ligue 3 ====
Pos	Team	Pld	W	D	L	GF	GA	GD	Pts	Promotion or Relegation
1	La Roche	12	8	3	1	19	10	+9	27	Promotion to Ligue 2
2	Rouen	12	8	2	2	22	9	+13	26	Promotion to Ligue 2
3	Amiens	13	6	5	2	18	6	+12	23	Qualification for promotion play-off quarter-final
4	Caen	13	7	1	5	23	17	+6	22	Qualification for promotion play-off quarter-final
5	Versailles	12	7	1	4	19	14	+5	22	Qualification for promotion play-off quarter-final
6	Concarneau	12	5	5	2	16	11	+5	20	Qualification for promotion play-off quarter-final
7	Cannes	12	4	6	2	14	8	+6	18	
8	Le Puy	12	5	3	4	15	12	+3	18	
9	Paris 13 Atletico	12	4	4	4	11	12	−1	16	
10	Thionville	12	4	4	4	17	17	0	16	
11	Quevilly-Rouen	12	4	4	4	13	16	−3	16	
12	Fleury	12	4	4	4	17	15	+2	16	
13	Bastia	12	4	3	5	10	14	−4	15	
14	Orléans	12	2	5	5	12	17	−5	11	
15	Valenciennes	12	2	4	6	13	19	−6	10	
16	Villefranche	12	2	2	8	10	26	−16	8	Relegation to National 1
17	Aubagne Air Bel	12	2	1	9	6	19	−13	7	Relegation to National 1
18	Bourg-Péronnas	12	1	3	8	6	19	−13	6	Relegation to National 1

Updated to match(es) played on 19 November 2026. Source: Ligue 3 2026–27
Rules for classification: 1) head-to-head results; 2) head-to-head goal difference; 3) goal difference; 4) goals scored; 5) fair play points

=== Women ===
==== Première Ligue ====
===== Regular season =====
Pos	Team	Pld	W	D	L	GF	GA	GD	Pts	Qualification or relegation
1	Lyon	9	9	0	0	49	6	+43	27	Qualification for the play-offs
2	Paris Saint-Germain	9	7	1	1	16	6	+10	22	Qualification for the play-offs
3	Paris FC	8	6	1	1	21	10	+11	19	Qualification for the play-offs
4	Fleury	9	4	3	2	18	15	+3	15	Qualification for the play-offs
5	Marseille	9	4	3	2	11	14	−3	15	
6	Nantes	9	3	3	3	10	9	+1	12	
7	Strasbourg	9	3	2	4	15	16	−1	11	
8	Le Havre	9	2	3	4	7	17	−10	9	
9	Montpellier	9	1	3	5	9	16	−7	6	
10	Toulouse	9	1	2	6	9	30	−21	5	
11	Saint-Malo	8	1	0	7	5	15	−10	3	Relegation to the Seconde Ligue
12	Lens	9	0	3	6	7	23	−16	3	Relegation to the Seconde Ligue

Updated to match(es) played on 14 November 2026. Source: FFF.fr
Rules for classification: 1) points; 2) head-to-head points; 3) head-to-head goal difference; 4) goal difference; 5) goals scored

== Cup competitions ==
=== Men ===
==== Trophée des Champions ====
16 August 2026
20:45 CEST

Lens	1–0	Paris Saint-Germain
Thauvin 32'	Report

Stade Bollaert-Delelis, Lens
Attendance: 38,223
Referee: Jérémie Pignard
