= Daren Mosengo =

French footballer (born 2006)

Personal information
- Date of birth: 11 August 2006 (age 20)
- Place of birth: Rennes, France
- Height: 1.88 m (6 ft 2 in)
- Position: Defensive midfielder

Team information
- Current team: Le Havre
- Number: 78

Youth career
- 2011–2018: AFC Saint-Cyr
- 2018–2020: Versailles
- 2020–2024: Le Havre

Senior career*
Years	Team	Apps	(Gls)
2024–	Le Havre II	3	(0)
2025–	Le Havre	8	(0)

International career^{‡}
2024	France U19	2	(0)
- * Club domestic league appearances and goals as of 22:43, 12 September 2026 (UTC) ‡ National team caps and goals as of 03:02, 17 August 2025 (UTC)

Daren Nbenbege Mosengo (born 11 August 2006) is a French professional footballer who plays as a defensive midfielder for Ligue 1 club Le Havre.

== Career ==
Mosengo is a product of the youth academies of AFC Saint-Cyr l'école, Versailles, and Le Havre. On 27 May 2023, he signed a youth contract with Le Havre until 2026, and made his debut for their reserves in 2024. On 2 July 2024, he signed his first professional contract with the club, running until 2027. Mosengo made his debut for Le Havre as a substitute in a 3–1 loss to Monaco on 16 August 2025.

== International career ==
Born in France, Mosengo is of DR Congolese descent and holds dual French-DR Congo citizenship. In September 2024, he was called up to the France U19s.

== Career statistics ==
As of match played 12 September 2026

Appearances and goals by club, season and competition
Club	Season	League			Cup		Other		Total	
Club	Season	Division	Apps	Goals	Apps	Goals	Apps	Goals	Apps	Goals
Le Havre II	2023–24	National 2	3	0	—		—		3	0
Le Havre	2025–26	Ligue 1	7	0	1	0	—		8	0
Le Havre	2026–27	Ligue 1	1	0	0	0	—		1	0
Le Havre	Total		8	0	1	0	—		9	0
Career total			11	0	1	0	0	0	12	0
