= Joël Beaujouan =

French footballer (born 1948)

Personal information
- Date of birth: 11 October 1948 (age 78)
- Place of birth: Besançon, France
- Height: 1.78 m (5 ft 10 in)
- Position: Goalkeeper

Senior career*
| Years | Team | Apps | (Gls) |
| 1967–1969 | RC Franc-Comtois | | |
| 1969–1971 | Valenciennes | | |
| 1971–1974 | Le Mans | | |
| 1974–1984 | Amiens | | |

Managerial career
- 1987–1988: Amiens (goalkeeping coach)
- 1988–1998: Le Havre (head of youth dpt.)
- 1998–1999: Le Havre
- 2000: Le Havre
- 2003–2004: Dubai CSC
- 2004–2005: Romorantin
- 2005–2006: Al-Khor (assistant)
- 2006–2008: Compiègne
- * Club domestic league appearances and goals

Joël Beaujouan (born 11 October 1948) is a French retired football player and manager who played as a goalkeeper. (Note: Joël Beaujouan at WorldFootball.net)
