= Enzo Koffi =

French footballer

Personal information
- Full name: Enzo Koffi Vinette
- Date of birth: 4 March 2006 (age 20)
- Place of birth: Lisieux, France
- Height: 1.73 m (5 ft 8 in)
- Position: Winger

Team information
- Current team: Le Havre
- Number: 27

Youth career
- 2015–2025: Le Havre

Senior career*
Years	Team	Apps	(Gls)
2023–	Le Havre II	19	(4)
2025–	Le Havre	20	(0)
- * Club domestic league appearances and goals as of 19:16, 18 October 2026 (UTC) ‡ National team caps and goals as of 21:18, 28 November 2025 (UTC)

Enzo Koffi Vinette (born 4 March 2006) is a French professional footballer who plays as a winger for Ligue 1 club Le Havre.

== Club career ==
Koffi joined the youth academy of Le Havre in 2015. He made his senior and professional debut with Le Havre in a 1–1 Ligue 1 tie with Lorient on 21 May 2025.

== Personal life ==
Born in France, Koffi is of Ivorian and Jamaican descent. Outside of football, he ran hurdles as a youth.

== Career statistics ==
As of match played 18 October 2026

Appearances and goals by club, season and competition
Club	Season	League			Cup		Europe		Other		Total	
Club	Season	Division	Apps	Goals	Apps	Goals	Apps	Goals	Apps	Goals	Apps	Goals
Le Havre II	2023–24	National 2	19	4	—		—		—		19	4
Le Havre	2025–26	Ligue 1	14	0	0	0	—		—		14	0
Le Havre	2026–27	Ligue 1	6	0	0	0	—		—		6	0
Le Havre	Total		20	0	0	0	—		—		20	0
Career total			39	4	0	0	0	0	0	0	39	4
