= Noam Obougou =

French footballer (born 2006)

Personal information
- Full name: Noam Obougou Jacquet
- Date of birth: 15 March 2006 (age 20)
- Place of birth: Besançon, France
- Position: Forward

Team information
- Current team: Nancy (on loan from Le Havre)
- Number: 29

Youth career
- Velotte
- Besançon Football
- Racing Besançon
- 2021–2025: Le Havre

Senior career*
Years	Team	Apps	(Gls)
2023–	Le Havre B	21 (Note: Statistics only available for the 2023–24 Championnat National 3.)	(2)
2025–	Le Havre	5	(1)
2026–	→ Nancy	0	(0)
- * Club domestic league appearances and goals as of 13:25, 15 April 2026 (UTC)

Noam Obougou Jacquet (born 15 March 2006) is a French professional footballer who plays as a forward for Ligue 2 club Nancy, on loan from Ligue 1 club Le Havre.

== Career ==
=== Le Havre ===
Born in Besançon, Obougou came through the youth ranks of local clubs Velotte, Besançon Football, and Racing Besançon before joining the Le Havre academy in 2021. He made his professional debut in Ligue 1 for Le Havre in a 0–0 draw against Paris FC on 7 December 2025, winning a penalty for his team. On 4 January 2026, he scored his first professional goal, the winner in a 2–1 victory over Angers. Nine days later, Obougou signed his first professional contract with Le Havre.

==== Loan to Nancy ====
On 12 August 2026, Obougou joined Ligue 2 side Nancy on loan for the 2026–27 season.

== Personal life ==
Born in France, Obougou is of Cameroonian descent.
