= Davide Ancelotti =

Italian football coach (born 1989)

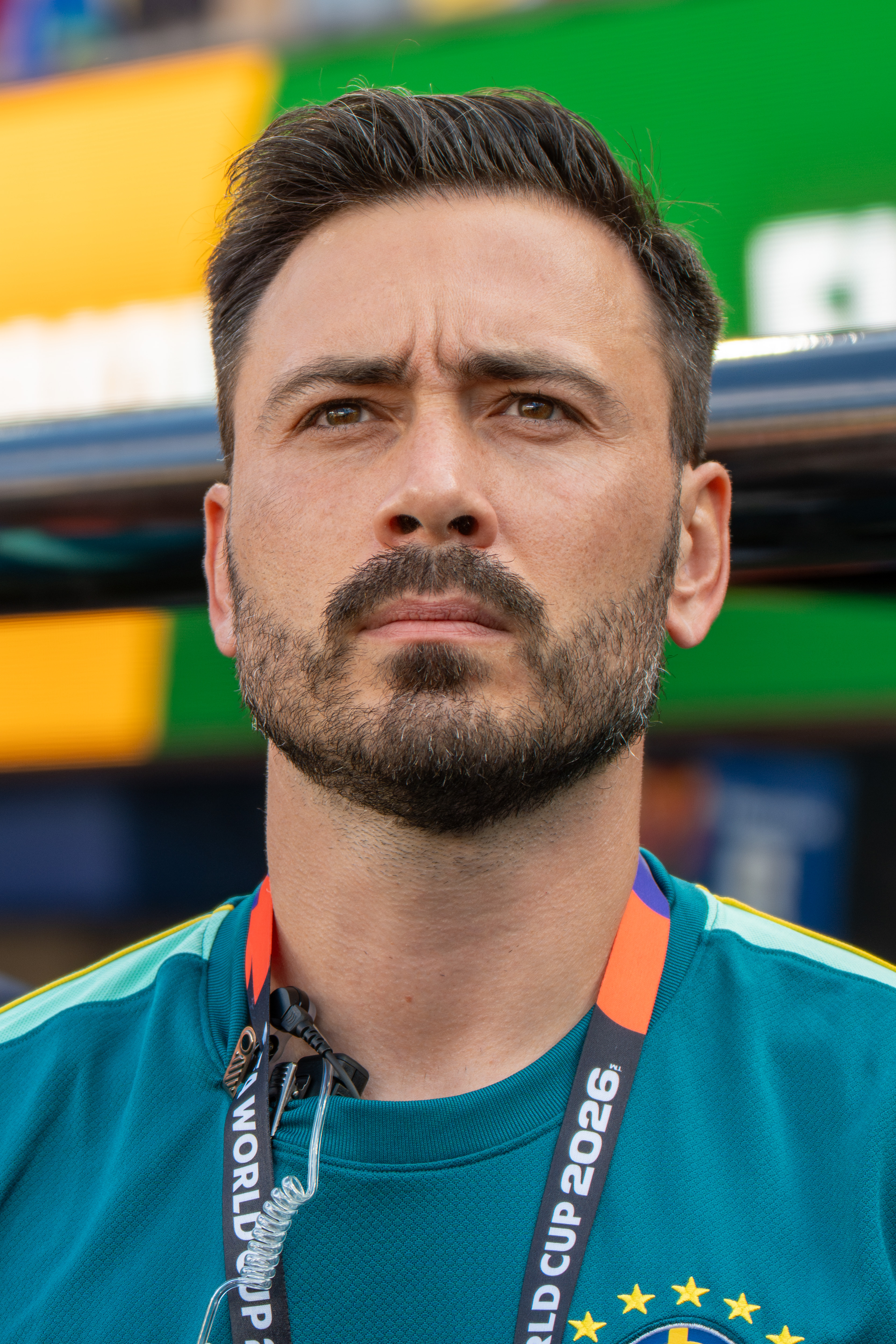
- Ancelotti in 2026

Personal information
- Date of birth: 22 July 1989 (age 37)
- Place of birth: Parma, Italy
- Position: Midfielder

Team information
- Current team: Lille (head coach)

Youth career
- 2007–2009: AC Milan

Senior career*
Years	Team	Apps	(Gls)
2008–2009	AC Milan	0	(0)
2008–2009	→ Borgomanero (loan)	4	(0)
2009	Borgomanero	14	(1)
Total		18	(1)

Managerial career
- 2025: Botafogo
- 2026–: Lille
- * Club domestic league appearances and goals

Davide Ancelotti (born 22 July 1989) is an Italian professional football manager and former player who is the head coach of Ligue 1 club Lille.

== Early life ==
Born in Parma to football player and coach Carlo Ancelotti and Luisa Gibellini, Davide followed in his father's footsteps, becoming a professional footballer with AC Milan, playing as a midfielder. Following a loan spell and subsequent permanent transfer to Borgomanero, Ancelotti retired as a player at the age of 20 in 2009 to pursue a career in management.

At the age of 22, Ancelotti gained a degree in sports science.

== Managerial career ==
=== Early career ===
Ancelotti's first foray into football coaching came in 2012, when he was appointed as a fitness coach at French side Paris Saint-Germain, where his father was manager. After Ancelotti Sr. moved to Spain to manage Real Madrid, Davide followed, working as an assistant to the club's fitness coach.

=== Assistant ===
Having received his UEFA A Licence in 2016, notably finishing top of his class, Ancelotti took up the position of assistant manager to Carlo Ancelotti at German side Bayern Munich. At Bayern, he struck up a friendship with Spanish midfielder Thiago Alcântara, and reportedly angered some of the squad with this familiarity, as opposed to a more professional working dynamic, having gone out with a group of players to dinner on a number of occasions.

When Carlo Ancelotti took up the managerial role at Serie A club Napoli in 2018, Davide again served as his assistant, and after Ancelotti Sr. was suspended for an away game against Roma, Ancelotti made his managerial debut, stepping in for his father and overseeing a 2–1 loss in November 2019.

In December 2019, Ancelotti moved to England to serve as assistant to his father at Everton. Working alongside fellow assistant Duncan Ferguson, the two would take charge of training sessions.

Having followed his father to Spain to work under him at Real Madrid, it was rumoured that Ancelotti would lead the team against Celta Vigo in April 2022, following Carlo's COVID-19 diagnosis. However, as Ancelotti lacked a UEFA Pro licence at the time, he was unable to give the team instructions, despite being allowed to stand on the touchline.

Ancelotti successfully attained a UEFA Pro Licence in July 2023, after graduating from a specific coaching course in Wales. In May 2024, he was described as his father's "secret weapon" at Real Madrid.

In June 2025, Ancelotti was announced as Brazil national team's new assistant coach.

=== Botafogo ===
On 8 July 2025, Ancelotti had his first experience as head coach after being announced at the helm of Campeonato Brasileiro Série A side Botafogo on a contract until December 2026; he replaced sacked Renato Paiva. The Italian coach took charge of the team for the first time four days later, in Botafogo's victory over Vasco da Gama in Brasília, in the 13th round of the 2025 Série A. At the time, he signed the match report as an assistant goalkeeping coach, as he was not yet fully registered as a coach with the Brazilian Football Confederation.

Two days after his debut, on 14 July 2025, Ancelotti was officially introduced at a press conference at the Nilton Santos Stadium. He was dismissed in December of that year after his team finished sixth in the league.

=== Lille ===
On 1 June 2026, Ancelotti was unveiled as Ligue 1 club Lille's new head coach ahead of the 2026–27 Ligue 1 season on a contract until June 2028.

== Managerial style ==
Seen as a modern, advanced coach, Ancelotti shares his father's calm, relaxed approach to management. Having worked as a fitness coach, he would often lead pre-match warmups, as he did at Everton with head of conditioning Francesco Mauri. Working closely with his father, notably never referring to him as "dad,” the pair would often bounce ideas off each other, with Ancelotti not taking a back seat, leading to a level of interdependency developing between the two.

== Personal life ==
Ancelotti speaks Italian, French, Spanish, German, and English.

In June 2022, Davide married artist Ana Galocha. The couple have two sons, twins Lucas and Leonardo.

== Managerial statistics ==
As of 21 November 2026

Managerial record by team and tenure
Team	Nat.	From	To	Record								Ref
Team	Nat.	From	To	G	W	D	L	GF	GA	GD	Win %	Ref
Botafogo	(Brazil)	8 July 2025	17 December 2025	33	15	11	7	50	35	+15	45.45	
Lille	(France)	1 June 2026	Present	15	6	4	5	18	18	+0	40.00	
Career total				48	21	15	12	68	53	+15	43.75	—
