= Thierry Uvenard =

French footballer (born 1964)

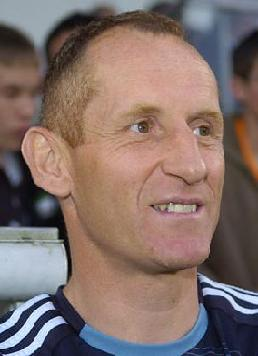
- Uvenard in the 2006–07 season

Personal information
- Date of birth: 26 March 1964 (age 62)
- Place of birth: Le Havre, France
- Height: 1.80 m (5 ft 11 in)
- Position: Defender

Senior career*
Years	Team	Apps	(Gls)
1981–1987	Le Havre B		
1987–1997	Le Havre		

Managerial career
- 1998: Le Havre (youth)
- 1998–2004: Le Havre (assistant)
- 2004–2005: Le Havre (youth)
- 2005–2007: Le Havre
- 2007–2008: Le Havre (coordinator)
- 2008–2015: Toulouse (assistant)
- 2016: Lens (assistant)
- 2017–2020: Le Havre (women)
- * Club domestic league appearances and goals

Thierry Uvenard (born 29 March 1964) is a French football manager and former player. He played as a defender.
