= OGC Nice in European football =

French club in European football

- Club: OGC Nice
- First entry: 1956–57 European Cup
- Latest entry: 2025–26 UEFA Europa League

This article lists results for French association football team OGC Nice in European competition.

== Participations ==
As of September 2024, Nice have competed in:

- 3 editions of the European Cup / UEFA Champions League
- 1 edition of the UEFA Cup Winners' Cup
- 7 editions of the UEFA Cup / UEFA Europa League
- 1 edition of the UEFA Europa Conference League
- 3 participations in the Inter-Cities Fairs Cup

=== Record by competition ===
As of 29 January 2026

Competition	Played	Won	Drawn	Lost	Goals for	Goals against
UEFA Champions League	18	5	4	9	24	34
UEFA Cup Winners' Cup	4	1	3	0	7	5
UEFA Europa League	46	12	3	31	53	83
UEFA Europa Conference League	12	5	4	3	17	13
Inter-Cities Fairs Cup	6	1	1	4	5	13
Total	86	24	15	47	106	148

== Matches in Europe ==
Season	Competition	Round	Opponent	Home	Away	Agg.
1956–57	European Cup	Preliminary Round	(Denmark) AGF Aarhus	5–1	1–1	6–2
1956–57	European Cup	First Round	(Scotland) Rangers	2–1	1–2	6–4 (po 3–1)
1956–57	European Cup	Quarter-Final	(Spain) Real Madrid	2–3	0–3	2–6
1959–60	European Cup	Preliminary Round	(Republic of Ireland) Shamrock Rovers	3–2	1–1	4–3
1959–60	European Cup	First Round	(Turkey) Fenerbahçe	2–1	1–2	8–4 (po 5–1)
1959–60	European Cup	Quarter-Final	(Spain) Real Madrid	3–2	0–4	3–6
1966–67	Inter-Cities Fairs Cup	First Round	(Sweden) Örgryte IS	2–2	1–2	3–4
1967–68	Inter-Cities Fairs Cup	First Round	(Italy) Fiorentina	0–1	0–4	0–5
1968–69	Inter-Cities Fairs Cup	First Round	(East Germany) Hansa Rostock	2–1	0–3	2–4
1973–74	UEFA Cup	First Round	(Spain) Barcelona	3–0	0–2	3–2
1973–74	UEFA Cup	Second Round	(Turkey) Fenerbahçe	4–0	0–2	4–2
1973–74	UEFA Cup	Third Round	(West Germany) 1. FC Köln	1–0	0–4	1–4
1976–77	UEFA Cup	First Round	(Spain) Espanyol	2–1	1–3	3–4
1997–98	Cup Winners' Cup	First Round	(Scotland) Kilmarnock	3–1	1–1	4–2
1997–98	Cup Winners' Cup	Second Round	(Czech Republic) Slavia Prague	2–2	1–1	3–3 (a)
2013–14	UEFA Europa League	Play-off Round	(Cyprus) Apollon Limassol	1–0	0–2	1–2
2016–17	UEFA Europa League	Group I	(Germany) Schalke 04	0–1	0–2	4th
2016–17	UEFA Europa League	Group I	(Russia) Krasnodar	2–1	2–5	4th
2016–17	UEFA Europa League	Group I	(Austria) Red Bull Salzburg	0–2	1–0	4th
2017–18	UEFA Champions League	Third Qualifying Round	(Netherlands) Ajax	1–1	2–2	3–3 (a)
2017–18	UEFA Champions League	Play-off Round	(Italy) Napoli	0–2	0–2	0–4
2017–18	UEFA Europa League	Group K	(Italy) Lazio	0–1	1–3	2nd
2017–18	UEFA Europa League	Group K	(Netherlands) Vitesse	3–0	0–1	2nd
2017–18	UEFA Europa League	Group K	(Belgium) Zulte Waregem	3–1	5–1	2nd
2017–18	UEFA Europa League	Round of 32	(Russia) Lokomotiv Moscow	2–3	0–1	2–4
2020–21	UEFA Europa League	Group C	(Germany) Bayer Leverkusen	2–3	2–6	4th
2020–21	UEFA Europa League	Group C	(Czech Republic) Slavia Prague	1–3	2–3	4th
2020–21	UEFA Europa League	Group C	(Israel) Hapoel Be'er Sheva	1–0	0–1	4th
2022–23	UEFA Europa Conference League	Play-off Round	(Israel) Maccabi Tel Aviv	2–0 (a.e.t.)	0–1	2–1
2022–23	UEFA Europa Conference League	Group D	(Germany) 1. FC Köln	1–1	2–2	1st
2022–23	UEFA Europa Conference League	Group D	(Serbia) Partizan	2–1	1–1	1st
2022–23	UEFA Europa Conference League	Group D	(Czech Republic) Slovácko	1–2	1–0	1st
2022–23	UEFA Europa Conference League	Round of 16	(Moldova) Sheriff Tiraspol	3–1	1–0	4–1
2022–23	UEFA Europa Conference League	Quarter-Final	(Switzerland) Basel	1–2 (a.e.t.)	2–2	3–4
2024–25	UEFA Europa League	League Phase	(Spain) Real Sociedad	1–1	—N/a	35th
2024–25	UEFA Europa League	League Phase	(Italy) Lazio	—N/a	1–4	35th
2024–25	UEFA Europa League	League Phase	(Hungary) Ferencváros	—N/a	0–1	35th
2024–25	UEFA Europa League	League Phase	(Netherlands) Twente	2–2	—N/a	35th
2024–25	UEFA Europa League	League Phase	(Scotland) Rangers	1–4	—N/a	35th
2024–25	UEFA Europa League	League Phase	(Belgium) Union Saint-Gilloise	—N/a	1–2	35th
2024–25	UEFA Europa League	League Phase	(Sweden) IF Elfsborg	—N/a	0–1	35th
2024–25	UEFA Europa League	League Phase	(Norway) Bodø/Glimt	1–1	—N/a	35th
2025–26	UEFA Champions League	Third Qualifying Round	(Portugal) Benfica	0–2	0–2	0–4
2025–26	UEFA Europa League	League Phase	(Italy) Roma	1–2	—N/a	33rd
2025–26	UEFA Europa League	League Phase	(Turkey) Fenerbahçe	—N/a	1–2	33rd
2025–26	UEFA Europa League	League Phase	(Spain) Celta Vigo	—N/a	1–2	33rd
2025–26	UEFA Europa League	League Phase	(Germany) SC Freiburg	1–3	—N/a	33rd
2025–26	UEFA Europa League	League Phase	(Portugal) Porto	—N/a	0–3	33rd
2025–26	UEFA Europa League	League Phase	(Portugal) Braga	0–1	—N/a	33rd
2025–26	UEFA Europa League	League Phase	(Netherlands) Go Ahead Eagles	3–1	—N/a	33rd
2025–26	UEFA Europa League	League Phase	(Bulgaria) Ludogorets Razgrad	—N/a	0–1	33rd
