= 2026–27 Ligue 1 =

89th season of the Ligue 1

Ligue 1
- Season: 2026–27
- Dates: 21 August 2026 – 29 May 2027
- Matches: 90
- Goals: 266 (2.96 per match)
- Top goalscorer: Lassine Sinayoko (8 goals)
- Biggest home win: Marseille 4–0 Strasbourg (21 August 2026); Lyon 4–0 Rennes (19 September 2026); Brest 5–1 Angers (10 October 2026); Strasbourg 5–1 Auxerre (1 November 2026)
- Biggest away win: Troyes 2–6 Strasbourg (6 September 2026); Le Havre 1–5 Paris Saint-Germain (30 October 2026)
- Highest scoring: Troyes 2–6 Strasbourg (6 September 2026)
- Longest winning run: Paris Saint-Germain (7 matches)
- Longest unbeaten run: Paris Saint-Germain (7 matches)
- Longest winless run: Le Havre (10 matches)
- Longest losing run: Le Havre (6 matches)
- Highest attendance: 65,089; Marseille 4–0 Strasbourg (21 August 2026)
- Lowest attendance: 5,294; Monaco 2–2 Toulouse (10 October 2026)
- Attendance: 2,004,355 (22,271 per match)
- All statistics correct as of 1 November 2026.

The 2026–27 Ligue 1, also known as Ligue 1 McDonald's for sponsorship reasons, is the 89th season of the Ligue 1, France's premier football competition. It began on 21 August 2026 and is set to conclude on 29 May 2027.

Paris Saint-Germain are the five-time defending champions.

== Teams ==
A total of eighteen teams are participating in the 2026–27 edition of the Ligue 1. Troyes and Le Mans return to the top flight after three and sixteen respective years of absence. Metz and Nantes were relegated to Ligue 2 after one and thirteen respective years in the top flight.

=== Changes ===
▲ from 2025–26 Ligue 2	▼ to 2026–27 Ligue 2
Troyes	Metz
Le Mans	Nantes

=== Stadiums and locations ===
Location of teams in 2026–27 Ligue 1

Club	Location	Venue	Capacity
Angers	Angers	Stade Raymond Kopa	19 800
Auxerre	Auxerre	Stade Abbé Deschamps	17 897
Brest	Brest	Stade Francis-Le Blé	15,220
Le Havre	Le Havre	Stade Océane	25,181
Le Mans	Le Mans	Stade Marie-Marvingt	25,064
Lens	Lens	Stade Bollaert-Delelis	38,223
Lille	Villeneuve-d'Ascq	Stade Pierre-Mauroy	50,186
Lorient	Lorient	Stade du Moustoir	18,110
Lyon	Décines-Charpieu	Groupama Stadium	59,186
Marseille	Marseille	Stade Vélodrome	67,394
Monaco	Monaco	Stade Louis II	16,360
Nice	Nice	Allianz Riviera	36,178
Paris FC	Paris (Paris 16)	Stade Jean-Bouin	20,000
Paris Saint-Germain	Paris (Paris 16)	Parc des Princes	47,926
Rennes	Rennes	Roazhon Park	29,778
Strasbourg	Strasbourg	Stade de la Meinau	32,000
Toulouse	Toulouse	Stadium de Toulouse	33,150
Troyes	Troyes	Stade de l'Aube	21,877

=== Personnel and kits ===
Team	Chairman	Manager	Captain	Kit maker	Sponsors	
Team	Chairman	Manager	Captain	Kit maker	Main	Other(s)
Angers	(France) Romain Chabane	(France) Stéphane Gilli	(Algeria) Haris Belkebla	Nike	École Noir&Blanc	List: Front: Maison de l'Atoll, Angers; Back: None; Sleeves: None; Shorts: Système U; Socks: None
Auxerre	(France) Baptiste Malherbe	(Belgium) Will Still	(Ghana) Elisha Owusu	Macron	X1 Xi Wang Sports Nutrition Drink	List: Front: SPPE, JUSSIEU Secours; Back: Les Constructeurs Réunis, Acadomia; Sleeves: Groupama; Shorts: Auxerre, Advise Énergie, Cichy Manutention; Socks: None
Brest	(France) Denis Le Saint	(France) Julien Lachuer	(France) Brendan Chardonnet	Adidas	Quéguiner Matériaux (H) / Yaourt Malo (A & 3)	List: Front: SILL (H) / Breizh Cola (A & 3), GUYOT Environnement, Oceania Hotels, Le Football à la Pointe; Back: Oriance, J.Bervas Automobiles; Sleeves: Le Rond Central; Shorts: E.Leclerc, Groupe SOFT; Socks: None
Le Havre	(United States) Vincent Volpe	(France) Valérien Ismaël	(Senegal) Rassoul Ndiaye	Hummel	Seafrigo	List: Front: SIM Agences d'emploi; Back: None; Sleeves: DF Industrie; Shorts: Zeturf; Socks: None
Le Mans	(France) Thierry Gomez	(France) Patrick Videira	(Central African Republic) Edwin Quarshie	Adidas	Hexaom	List: Front: Groupe EJ, Oeufs Matines; Back: Passenaud Recyclage; Sleeves: Of course Le Mans; Shorts: None; Socks: None
Lens	(France) Joseph Oughourlian	(France) Didier Digard	(France) Florian Thauvin	Adidas	Auchan	List: Front: Groupe Lempereur, Nexans; Back: Murprotec, Winamax; Sleeves: Aushopping; Shorts: Molinel, McDonald's; Socks: None
Lille	(France) Olivier Létang	(Italy) Davide Ancelotti	(France) Benjamin André	New Balance	Boulanger	List: Front: Actual Group; Back: Aushopping, Toyota; Sleeves: eToro; Shorts: None; Socks: None
Lyon	(United States) Michele Kang	(Spain) Carlos Vicens	(France) Corentin Tolisso	Adidas	Emirates	List: Front: None; Back: Winamax, XTB; Sleeves: MG Motor; Shorts: Trainline, Staffmatch; Socks: None
Lorient	(France) Loïc Féry	(France) Alexandre Dujeux	(Tunisia) Montassar Talbi	Joma	Jean Floc'h	List: Front: Acadomia, Breizh Cola; Back: World of Tanks, ANIEL Pièces Auto; Sleeves: Actual Group; Shorts: Cité Marine, B&B Hotels; Socks: None
Marseille	(France) Alban Juster	(France) Bruno Génésio	(United States) Timothy Weah	Puma	CMA CGM	List: Front: Unibet; Back: None; Sleeves: Sublime Côte d'Ivoire; Shorts: None; Socks: None
Monaco	(Russia) Dmitry Rybolovlev	(Brazil) Filipe Luís	(Switzerland) Denis Zakaria	Mizuno	APM Monaco	List: Front: Triangle Intérim; Back: Bang & Olufsen, Teddy Smith; Sleeves: RD Congo Coueur d'Afrique; Shorts: VBET, Simplicicar; Socks: None
Nice	(France) Jean-Pierre Rivère	(France) Olivier Pantaloni	(France) Jonathan Clauss	Kappa	Robinhood Markets	List: Front: Actual Group; Back: Limova.ai; Sleeves: Ineos; Shorts: VBET; Socks: None
Paris FC	(France) Antoine Arnault	(England) Liam Rosenior	(France) Pierre Lees-Melou	Adidas	Bahrain Victorious	List: Front: Google Pixel; Back: Vinci; Sleeves: Renault; Shorts: Bwin; Socks: None
Paris Saint-Germain	(Qatar) Nasser Al-Khelaifi	(Spain) Luis Enrique	(Brazil) Marquinhos	Nike	Qatar Airways	List: Front: None; Back: Snipes; Sleeves: BEYOND Developments; Shorts: None; Socks: None
Rennes	(France) Arnaud Pouille	(France) Franck Haise	(France) Valentin Rongier	Puma	Samsic	List: Front: Hellowork, Association ELA; Back: Winamax, Blot Immobilier; Sleeves: None; Shorts: BWT; Socks: None
Strasbourg	(France) Marc Keller	(Portugal) Vítor Matos	(Denmark) Filip Jörgensen	Adidas	Winamax	List: Front: Hager Group, Électricité de Strasbourg; Back: Soprema; Sleeves: Würth; Shorts: Atheo Ingenierie; Socks: None
Toulouse	(France) Olivier Cloarec	(Denmark) Jens Berthel Askou	(Denmark) Rasmus Nicolaisen	Nike	Casadora	List: Front: LP Promotion; Back: Winamax, Newrest; Sleeves: Starbucks; Shorts: None; Socks: None
Troyes	(England) Edwin Pindi	(France) Stéphane Dumont	(France) Adrien Monfray	Puma	Etihad Airways	List: Front: Troyes, norelem, McArthurGlen Troyes; Back: B-Partner; Sleeves: Century 21 Groupe Martinot; Shorts: Amplitude Groupe Automobile, Les Constructeurs Réunis

=== Managerial changes ===
Team	Outgoing manager	Manner of departure	Date of vacancy	Position in table	Incoming manager	Date of appointment
Lorient	(France) Olivier Pantaloni	End of contract	17 May 2026	Pre-season	(France) Alexandre Dujeux	9 June 2026
Toulouse	(Spain) Carles Martínez Novell	End of contract	17 May 2026	Pre-season	(Denmark) Jens Berthel Askou	21 May 2026
Auxerre	(France) Christophe Pélissier	Sacked	22 May 2026	Pre-season	(Belgium) Will Still	12 June 2026
Lille	(France) Bruno Génésio	Mutual consent	25 May 2026	Pre-season	(Italy) Davide Ancelotti	1 June 2026
Monaco	(Belgium) Sébastien Pocognoli	Sacked	1 June 2026	Pre-season	(Brazil) Filipe Luís	6 July 2026
Angers	(France) Alexandre Dujeux	Resigned	3 June 2026	Pre-season	(France) Stéphane Gilli	9 June 2026
Lens	(France) Pierre Sage	Signed by Crystal Palace	15 June 2026	Pre-season	(Germany) Dino Toppmöller	16 June 2026
Nice	(France) Claude Puel	Sacked	17 June 2026	Pre-season	(France) Olivier Pantaloni	17 June 2026
Brest	(France) Éric Roy	Deceased	17 June 2026	Pre-season	(France) Julien Lachuer	27 June 2026
Strasbourg	(England) Gary O'Neil	Signed by Ipswich Town	23 June 2026	Pre-season	(Portugal) Hugo Oliveira	12 July 2026
Marseille	(Senegal) Habib Beye	Sacked	30 June 2026	Pre-season	(France) Bruno Génésio	1 July 2026
Paris FC	(France) Antoine Kombouaré	Resigned	1 July 2026	Pre-season	(England) Liam Rosenior	7 July 2026
Lens	(Germany) Dino Toppmöller	Mutual consent	15 September 2026	10th	(France) Yannick Cahuzac	15 September 2026
Le Havre	(France) Didier Digard	Sacked	31 October 2026	18th	(France) Valérien Ismaël	12 November 2026
Lyon	(Portugal) Paulo Fonseca	Resigned	4 November 2026	3rd	(Spain) Carlos Vicens	9 November 2026
Lens	(France) Yannick Cahuzac	Sacked	10 November 2026	11th	(France) Didier Digard	13 November 2026
Strasbourg	(Portugal) Hugo Oliveira	Sacked	18 November 2026	13th	(Portugal) Vítor Matos	18 November 2026

== League table ==
Pos	Team	Pld	W	D	L	GF	GA	GD	Pts	Qualification or relegation
1	Paris Saint-Germain	10	7	2	1	22	10	+12	23	Qualification for the Champions League league phase
2	Lille	10	6	3	1	14	7	+7	21	Qualification for the Champions League league phase
3	Paris FC	10	6	2	2	17	10	+7	20	Qualification for the Champions League league phase
4	Marseille	10	6	0	4	22	14	+8	18	Qualification for the Champions League third qualifying round
5	Lyon	10	5	2	3	15	9	+6	17	Qualification for the Europa League league phase (Note: The 2026–27 Coupe de France winners also qualify for the Europa League league phase (or the sixth-placed team if the Coupe de France winners finish in the top five). If the Coupe de France winners finish in the top six, the Conference League spot will be passed to the seventh-placed team.)
6	Nice	10	5	2	3	15	12	+3	17	Qualification for the Conference League play-off round
7	Monaco	10	4	4	2	13	11	+2	16	
8	Rennes	10	5	1	4	21	21	0	16	
9	Brest	10	4	3	3	18	12	+6	15	
10	Lorient	10	4	3	3	9	8	+1	15	
11	Lens	10	4	1	5	17	15	+2	13	
12	Toulouse	10	3	4	3	15	14	+1	13	
13	Strasbourg	10	3	1	6	18	22	−4	10	
14	Auxerre	10	3	1	6	13	24	−11	10	
15	Le Mans	10	1	5	4	12	19	−7	8	
16	Angers	10	2	2	6	9	19	−10	8	Qualification for the relegation play-offs
17	Troyes	10	2	2	6	7	17	−10	8	Relegation to Ligue 2
18	Le Havre	10	0	2	8	9	22	−13	2	Relegation to Ligue 2

Updated to match(es) played on 8 November 2026. Source: Ligue 1
Rules for classification: 1) Points; 2) Goal difference; 3) Head-to-head points; 4) Head-to-head goal difference; 5) Goals scored; 6) Wins; 7) Away wins; 8) Fair-play points; 9) Drawing of lots.
(Note: Head-to-head record is used only after all the matches between the teams in question have been played).

== Results ==
Home \ Away	ANG	AUX	BRE	LEH	LMA	LEN	LIL	LOR	OL	OM	ASM	NIC	PFC	PSG	REN	STR	TFC	TRO
Angers	—						0–2	0–0		2–5		0–2			1–2			2–0
Auxerre	1–3	—	2–1		1–1							1–0	0–1					
Brest	5–1		—						2–0			1–2		0–1			2–2	
Le Havre	0–0	1–3	1–2	—				0–2			0–1			1–5				
Le Mans			2–2		—	2–2		2–1			1–1						0–3	
Lens		5–2				—	a	0–1	2–1	1–2			2–1					
Lille			1–1	1–0		1–0	—							2–2				2–0
Lorient			0–2					—			1–0		1–0				2–2	1–2
Lyon	2–0	3–1		1–1					—	a		2–1			4–0			
Marseille				4–3					a	—			2–3	1–2		4–0	2–0	
Monaco						2–1	1–1			2–0	—	a					2–2	
Nice					1–1		2–1	0–0			a	—			5–2	2–1		
Paris FC									0–0		3–1	3–0	—	a	4–3	2–1		
Paris Saint-Germain					3–1				2–0	a	1–2		a	—				1–0
Rennes		4–1			3–2		1–2			1–0				2–2	—	3–0		
Strasbourg		5–1				2–1					1–1			1–3		—		
Toulouse				3–2			0–1		0–2							3–1	—	0–0
Troyes					2–0	1–3				0–2			0–0			2–6		—

Updated to match(es) played on 8 November 2026. Source: Ligue 1
Legend: Blue = home team win; Yellow = draw; Red = away team win.
For upcoming matches, an "a" indicates there is an article about the rivalry between the two participants.

== Season statistics ==
As of 9 November 2026

=== Top scorers ===
Rank	Player	Club	Goals
1	(Mali) Lassine Sinayoko	Paris FC	9
2	(Algeria) Amine Gouiri	Marseille	7
2	(France) Esteban Lepaul	Rennes	7
4	(England) Cameron Archer	Auxerre	6
4	(Ivory Coast) Elye Wahi	Nice	6
6	(France) Ludovic Ajorque	Rennes	5
6	(Senegal) Boulaye Dia	Rennes	5
6	(Denmark) Casper Tengstedt	Toulouse	5
6	(France) Florian Thauvin	Lens	5
10	(Morocco) Gessime Yassine	Strasbourg	4
10	(Germany) Paris Brunner	Monaco	4
10	(Mali) Kamory Doumbia	Brest	4
10	(Central African Republic) Louis Mafouta	Le Mans	4
10	(Spain) Ferran Torres	Paris Saint-Germain	4
10	(Nigeria) Josh Maja	Le Havre	4
10	(Ghana) Ernest Nuamah	Lyon	4
10	(Poland) Sebastian Szymański	Rennes	4

==== Hat-tricks ====
Player	For	Against	Result	Date
(Mali) Lassine Sinayoko	Paris FC	Marseille	3–2 (A)	6 September 2026
(France) Esteban Lepaul	Rennes	Paris FC	3–4 (A)	18 October 2026
(Morocco) Achraf Hakimi	Paris Saint-Germain	Le Havre	1–5 (A)	30 October 2026
(Ivory Coast) Elye Wahi	Nice	Rennes	5–2 (H)	30 October 2026

=== Clean sheets ===
Rank	Player	Club	Clean sheets
1	(Switzerland) Yvon Mvogo	Lorient	6
2	(Turkey) Berke Özer	Lille	5
3	(Germany) Kevin Trapp	Paris FC	4
4	(Netherlands) Jeffrey de Lange	Marseille	3
4	(Slovakia) Dominik Greif	Lyon	3
4	(Russia) Matvey Safonov	Paris Saint-Germain	3
4	(Portugal) Anthony Lopes	Angers	3
8	Six players		2

=== Discipline ===
==== Player ====
- Most yellow cards: 5
  - (Ivory Coast) Junior Diaz (Troyes)
- Most red cards: 1
  - Twelve players

==== Club ====
- Most yellow cards: 24
  - Nice
- Fewest yellow cards: 10
  - Paris Saint-Germain
- Most red cards: 2
  - Auxerre
  - Le Havre
  - Lens
- Fewest red cards: 0
  - Nine teams

== Awards ==
=== Monthly ===
Month	Player of the Month		Ref.
Month	Player	Club	Ref.
September	(Spain) Ferran Torres	Paris Saint-Germain	

== See also ==
- 2026–27 Ligue 2
- 2026–27 Ligue 3
- 2026–27 Championnat National 1
- 2026–27 Championnat National 2
- 2026–27 Championnat National 3
- 2026–27 Coupe de France
