= Stephan Zagadou =

French footballer (born 2008)

Personal information
- Date of birth: 24 October 2008 (age 18)
- Place of birth: Créteil, France
- Height: 1.86 m (6 ft 1 in)
- Position: Centre-back

Team information
- Current team: Le Havre
- Number: 29

Youth career
- 2015–2023: Créteil
- 2023–: Le Havre

Senior career*
Years	Team	Apps	(Gls)
2025–	Le Havre	8	(1)

International career^{‡}
2024	France U17	2	(0)
2025	France U18	1	(0)
2026–	France U19	2	(0)
- * Club domestic league appearances and goals as of 19:13, 12 April 2026 (UTC) ‡ National team caps and goals as of 28 March 2026

Stephan Zagadou (born 24 October 2008) is a French professional footballer who plays as a centre-back for Ligue 1 club Le Havre.

== Club career ==
=== Early life ===
Stephan Zagadou was born in Créteil, in the Val-de-Marne department of France. Zagadou began his footballing education at his hometown club, US Créteil-Lusitanos, where he played from 2015 until 2023. In the summer of 2023, he joined the youth academy of Le Havre AC. His family reportedly chose Le Havre over clubs like Paris Saint-Germain due to the club's stable environment and a personal relationship with academy director François Rodrigues.

=== Le Havre AC ===
Zagadou made rapid progress through the youth ranks at Le Havre, quickly transitioning from the U17 and U19 teams to the reserve squad. On 21 October 2025, just three days before his 17th birthday, he signed his first professional contract with the club, running until June 2028.

On 29 October 2025, under manager Didier Digard, Zagadou made his professional debut in a Ligue 1 match against Stade Brestois 29 (a 1–0 victory). At 17 years and 5 days old, he became the youngest player in the history of Le Havre AC to play in Ligue 1. Overall, he became the fifth-youngest player to debut for the club across all professional divisions, following Matthias Lepiller, Saël Kumbedi, Anthony Le Tallec, and Florent Sinama-Pongolle. On 8 February 2026, during a ligue 1 match against RC Strasbourg, he opened the score with a header in the 26th minute, helping Le Havre to a 2–1 victory. By scoring at 17 years and 107 days, he became the youngest scorer for Le Havre in Ligue 1 since the 1947–1948 season and the first defender born in 2008 or later to score a goal in one of Europe's Top 5 leagues.

== International career ==
Born in France, Zagadou is of Ivorian descent. He is a French youth international. He has represented France at the under-17 level and under-18 level. He made his U18 debut on 12 October 2025 in a 2–2 friendly draw against England.

== Career statistics ==
As of match played 12 April 2026

Appearances and goals by club, season and competition
Club	Season	League			National cup		Other		Total	
Club	Season	Division	Apps	Goals	Apps	Goals	Apps	Goals	Apps	Goals
Le Havre	2025–26	Ligue 1	8	1	—		—		8	1
Career total			8	1	0	0	0	0	8	1

== Personal life ==
He is the youngest of four brothers; his older brother Dan-Axel plays for VfB Stuttgart, while brothers Yohan and Dressy also played at various competitive levels.
