= 2026–27 Ligue 2 =

French second division football league

Ligue 2
- Season: 2026–27
- Dates: 8 August 2026 – 22 May 2027
- All statistics correct as of 17 May 2026.

The 2026–27 Ligue 2, commonly known as Ligue 2 BKT for sponsorship reasons, is the 88th season of Ligue 2. The season began on 8 August 2026 and is set to conclude on 22 May 2027.

== Overview ==
=== Promoted and relegation teams (pre-season) ===
Troyes and Le Mans were promoted to Ligue 1 after three and seventeen respective years of absence.

Metz and Nantes, however, were relegated to Ligue 2 after one and thirteen years in the top flight of French football, respectively.

Dijon and Sochaux will return to Ligue 2 from the Championnat National, which will be known as Ligue 3 from this season onwards, after both spending the last three seasons each in the second tier.

Bastia and Amiens were relegated to the newly formed Ligue 3, which was formerly known as Championnat National, after five and six years, respectively.

== Teams ==
=== To Ligue 2 ===
Promoted from National

- Dijon
- Sochaux

Relegated from Ligue 1

- Metz
- Nantes

=== From Ligue 2 ===
Promoted to Ligue 1

- Troyes
- Le Mans

Relegated to Ligue 3

- Bastia
- Amiens

=== Stadiums and locations ===
Locations of teams in the 2026–27 Ligue 2.

Team	Location	Stadium	Capacity	2025–26 season
Annecy	Annecy	Parc des Sports	15,660	7th in Ligue 2
Boulogne	Boulogne-sur-Mer	Stade de la Libération	9,534	15th in Ligue 2
Clermont	Clermont-Ferrand	Stade Gabriel-Montpied	11,980	13th in Ligue 2
Dijon^{↑}	Dijon	Stade Gaston Gérard	15,995	1st in National
Dunkerque	Dunkirk	Stade Marcel-Tribut	4,933	10th in Ligue 2
Grenoble	Grenoble	Stade des Alpes	20,068	12th in Ligue 2
Guingamp	Guingamp	Stade de Roudourou	18,378	11th in Ligue 2
Laval	Laval	Stade Francis Le Basser	18,607	16th in Ligue 2
Metz^{↓}	Longeville-lès-Metz	Stade Saint-Symphorien	28,786	18th in Ligue 1
Montpellier	Montpellier	Stade de la Mosson	32,900	8th in Ligue 2
Nancy	Tomblaine	Stade Marcel Picot	20,087	14th in Ligue 2
Nantes^{↓}	Nantes	Stade de la Beaujoire	35,322	17th in Ligue 1
Pau	Pau	Nouste Camp	4,031	9th in Ligue 2
Red Star	Paris (Saint-Ouen)	Stade Bauer	10,000	4th in Ligue 2
Reims	Reims	Stade Auguste-Delaune	21,029	6th in Ligue 2
Rodez	Rodez	Stade Paul-Lignon	5,955	5th in Ligue 2
Saint-Étienne	Saint-Étienne	Stade Geoffroy-Guichard	41,965	3rd in Ligue 2
Sochaux^{↑}	Montbéliard	Stade Auguste-Bonal	20,005	2nd in National

^{↓}	Relegated from Ligue 1
^{↑}	Promoted from National

=== Personnel and kits ===
Note: Flags indicate national team as has been defined under FIFA eligibility rules. Players and coaches may hold more than one non-FIFA nationality.

Team	Manager	Captain	Kit manufacturer	Main kit sponsor	Other kit sponsor(s)
Annecy	(France national football team) Laurent Guyot	(Algeria national football team) Ahmed Kashi	(Germany) Adidas	MSC Cruises	List: Front: Mediaco Vrac, TeamWork; Back: Stgenergy, Nissan Groupe Maurin; Sleeves: Tissier Technique; Shorts: LP Charpente, Burger King
Boulogne	(France national football team) Fabien Dagneaux	(France national football team) Nathan Zohoré	(Germany) Jako		List: Front: None; Back: None; Sleeves: None; Shorts: None
Clermont	(France national football team) David Guion	(French Guiana national football team) Yoann Salmier	(Italy) Kappa		List: Front: None; Back: None; Sleeves: None; Shorts: None
Dijon	(France national football team) Baptiste Ridira	(France national football team) Quentin Bernard	(United States) Nike		List: Front: None; Back: None; Sleeves: None; Shorts: None
Dunkerque	(Spain national football team) Albert Sánchez	(Guinea-Bissau national football team) Opa Sanganté	(Denmark) Hummel	Intersport	List: Front: Dunkerque Communauté Urbaine, Topensi; Back: DS Levage; Sleeves: 2024 Vivre les JO #dunkerqueagglo Tous en bleu, blanc, rouge; Shorts: Hauts-de-France, Onet
Grenoble	(France national football team) Olivier Frapolli	(France national football team) Gaëtan Paquiez	(United States) Nike	List: Home: Vinci Immobilier; Away: Carrefour Market	List: Front: Carrefour^{3}, Vinci Immobilier^{4}, Smart Good Things, Grenoble Alpes Métropole; Back: Chamrousse, Le Cabanon en Provence; Sleeves: None; Shorts: LCR
Guingamp	(France national football team) Sylvain Ripoll	(France national football team) Dylan Louiserre	(Italy) Kappa	Breizh Cola	List: Front: Celtigel, Creactuel, Ballay; Back: Jardiman, Vital Concept; Sleeves: Cafés Coïc; Shorts: Bernard Jarnoux Crêpier, Tibbloc
Laval	(France national football team) David Vignes	(France national football team) Sam Sanna	(Italy) Kappa	Lactel	List: Front: La Mayenne Le Département, Laval Agglo; Back: V and B Cave & Bar, Groupe Lucas, Mayenne; Sleeves: Groupe Actual; Shorts: Laval Agglo, SEPAL, Aropiz
Metz	(France) Grégory Proment	(France) Gauthier Hein	(Italy) Kappa	Car Avenue	List: Front: CAR Avenue, MOSL Mosselle Sans Limite, Resilium AI, Malezieux, Axia Interim; Back: Technitoit, Nacon (H) / Force Glass (A); Sleeves: Eurométropole de Metz; Shorts: E. Leclerc, LCR
Montpellier	(France national football team) Zoumana Camara	(Switzerland national football team) Becir Omeragic	(United States) Nike	Swile	List: Front: None; Back: FAUN-Environnement, Montpellier Métropole, Big M Burger; Sleeves: FAUN-Environnement, Kaporal Jeans; Shorts: Loxam, Viwone
Nancy	(France national football team) Oswald Tanchot	(Guadeloupe national football team) Nicolas Saint-Ruf	(France) Decathlon	Hyundai	List: Front: None; Back: None; Sleeves: None; Shorts: None
Nantes	(France) Grégory Poirier	(France) Kelvin Amian	(Italy) Macron	Synergie	List: Front: Les Gars Des Eaux, Synergie; Back: Préservation du Patrimoine, Groupe Millet; Sleeves: LNA Santé; Shorts: Be Green
Pau	(France national football team) Thierry Debès	(France national football team) Jean Ruiz	(Spain) Joma	Pau	List: Front: Bullux Services, Casino de Pau, Intersport; Back: Arobase Intérim, Brico Fenêtre, Iroise Bellevie; Sleeves: Bullux Services; Shorts: Übi Care
Red Star	(France national football team) Damien Perrinelle	(France national football team) Ryad Hachem	(Italy) Kappa	TRUST'iT	List: Front: None; Back: None; Sleeves: None; Shorts: None
Reims	(France national football team) Nicolas Usaï	(Malta national football team) Teddy Teuma	(Germany) Puma	Yasuda	List: Front: None; Back: None; Sleeves: None; Shorts: None
Rodez	(France national football team) Didier Santini	(France national football team) Raphaël Lipinski	(Germany) Adidas	E.Leclerc	List: Front: Maxoutil; Back: JeanStation, Thermatic, Ville de Rodez, Aveyron, Rodez Agglomération, Occitanie; Sleeves: aveyron.fr; Shorts: Intersport, Maxoutil, Andrieu Construction
Saint-Étienne	(Scotland national football team) Ian Cathro	(France national football team) Gautier Larsonneur	(Denmark) Hummel	Loire	List: Front: Kelyps Intérim, BYmyCAR, Terroir Halles; Back: Siléane; Sleeves: None; Shorts: Kapriol, Desjoyaux
Sochaux	(France national football team) Vincent Hognon	(France national football team) Arthur Vitelli	(France) Eldera		List: Front: None; Back: None; Sleeves: None; Shorts: None

1. Apparel made by club.
2. Applied on home shirt
3. Applied on away shirt
4. Applied on third shirt

=== Managerial changes ===
Team	Outgoing manager	Manner of departure	Date of vacancy	Position in the table	Incoming manager	Date of appointment
Grenoble	(France) Frédéric Gueguen	End of interim spell	8 May 2026	Pre-season	(France) Olivier Frapolli	11 June 2026
Reims	(Belgium) Karel Geraerts	Mutual consent	14 May 2026	Pre-season	(France) Nicolas Usaï	21 May 2026
Metz	(France) Benoît Tavenot	End of contract	17 May 2026	Pre-season	(Luxembourg) Luc Holtz	5 June 2026
Nantes	(Bosnia and Herzegovina) Vahid Halilhodžić	End of contract	17 May 2026	Pre-season	(Armenia) Michel Der Zakarian	17 June 2026
Laval	(France) Olivier Frapolli	Mutual consent	29 May 2026	Pre-season	(France) David Vignes	12 June 2026
Saint-Étienne	(France) Philippe Montanier	End of contract	7 June 2026	Pre-season	(Scotland) Ian Cathro	8 June 2026
Nancy	(Uruguay) Pablo Correa	End of contract	30 June 2026	Pre-season	(France) Oswald Tanchot	1 July 2026
Red Star	(France) Grégory Poirier	End of contract	30 June 2026	Pre-season	(France) Damien Perrinelle	1 July 2026
Clermont	(France) Grégory Proment (France) Sébastien Mazeyrat	End of contract	30 June 2026	Pre-season	(France) David Guion	1 July 2026
Nantes	(Armenia) Michel Der Zakarian	Sacked	24 August 2026	18th	(France) Grégory Poirier	25 August 2026
Metz	(Luxembourg) Luc Holtz	Sacked	28 September 2026	5th	(France) Grégory Proment	28 September 2026

== Standings ==
=== League table ===
Pos	Team	Pld	W	D	L	GF	GA	GD	Pts	Promotion or Relegation
1	Saint-Étienne	13	10	1	2	26	11	+15	31	Promotion to Ligue 1
2	Nancy	13	9	1	3	18	9	+9	28	Promotion to Ligue 1
3	Montpellier	13	7	3	3	18	10	+8	24	Qualification for promotion play-off semi-final
4	Reims	13	5	6	2	24	16	+8	21	Qualification for promotion play-off quarter-final
5	Metz	13	5	5	3	22	20	+2	20	Qualification for promotion play-off quarter-final
6	Pau	13	6	2	5	17	15	+2	20	
7	Red Star	13	6	2	5	16	18	−2	20	
8	Annecy	13	6	1	6	18	20	−2	19	
9	Dijon	13	5	3	5	21	20	+1	18	
10	Rodez	13	5	1	7	20	24	−4	16	
11	Dunkerque	12	4	3	5	17	17	0	15	
12	Guingamp	13	4	2	7	17	21	−4	14	
13	Boulogne	13	2	7	4	11	10	+1	13	
14	Nantes	12	3	3	6	14	18	−4	12	
15	Laval	13	3	3	7	15	23	−8	12	
16	Clermont	13	1	8	4	13	19	−6	11	Qualification for relegation play-off
17	Sochaux	12	2	5	5	8	15	−7	11	Relegation to Ligue 3
18	Grenoble	12	3	2	7	13	22	−9	11	Relegation to Ligue 3

Updated to match(es) played on 21 November 2026. Source: Ligue 2
Rules for classification: 1) Points; 2) Goal difference; 3) Number of goals scored; 4) Head-to-head goal difference; 5) Fair play points

== Results ==
=== Fixtures and results ===
Home \ Away	ANN	BOU	CLE	DIJ	DUN	GRE	GUI	LAV	MET	MON	NCY	NTS	PAU	RED	REI	ROD	STE	SOC
Annecy	—		4–2	1–2					1–1	0–3	1–2					2–0		
Boulogne	3–0	—		1–1							0–0	1–2		1–1	1–1			
Clermont		0–0	—	1–1			0–2							2–3	0–0	1–0		0–0
Dijon				—				3–2	4–2				0–1	1–0		1–2	2–3	
Dunkerque	0–1		1–1		—	4–2	3–0		1–1	0–1							2–1	
Grenoble	1–2	0–2	1–1	1–3		—			0–0						3–2			
Guingamp	2–1	1–0					—					3–3	1–2	1–3		1–3	3–0	
Laval		1–0	3–3			0–3		—		1–0		2–1		1–2				1–1
Metz		2–1					2–1	1–1	—				1–3			4–1	2–2	3–2
Montpellier		0–0		1–1		2–0			2–3	—			1–0	2–1				
Nancy				1–0	2–0		1–0	1–0		0–1	—				1–2			1–0
Nantes			1–1		2–3						1–0	—		0–1	0–0	2–5		
Pau	0–1				2–0	2–1		3–2			0–1	0–2	—					1–1
Red Star									1–0		1–4		2–1	—	1–4		0–1	0–0
Reims	3–1			4–2	3–3		2–2			1–1					—		0–1	2–0
Rodez					1–0	0–1		3–1		0–3	3–4		2–2			—		
Saint-Étienne			3–1			4–0		2–0		3–1		1–0				2–0	—	
Sochaux	1–3	1–1					1–0					1–0					0–3	—

Updated to match(es) played on 21 November 2026. Source: Ligue 2
Legend: Blue = home team win; Yellow = draw; Red = away team win.
For upcoming matches, an "a" indicates there is an article about the rivalry between the two participants.

== See also ==
- 2026–27 Ligue 1
- 2026–27 Ligue 3
- 2026–27 Championnat National 1
- 2026–27 Championnat National 2
- 2026–27 Coupe de France
