= Didier Digard =

French footballer (born 1986)

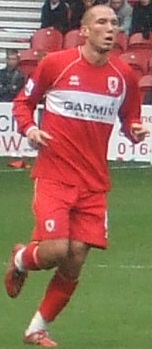
- Digard playing for Middlesbrough in 2008

Personal information
- Full name: Didier Frédéric Thierry Digard
- Date of birth: 12 July 1986 (age 40)
- Place of birth: Gisors, Eure, France
- Height: 1.83 m (6 ft 0 in)
- Position: Defensive midfielder

Team information
- Current team: Lens (head coach)

Youth career
- 1995–1996: Gisors Bézu
- 1998–2003: Le Havre

Senior career*
Years	Team	Apps	(Gls)
2003–2007	Le Havre	72	(3)
2007–2008	Paris Saint-Germain	16	(0)
2008–2011	Middlesbrough	32	(0)
2010–2011	→ Nice (loan)	12	(1)
2011–2015	Nice	133	(3)
2015–2017	Betis	8	(0)
2016–2017	→ Osasuna (loan)	3	(0)
2018	Lorca	6	(0)
Total		282	(7)

International career
2007–2008	France U21	10	(0)

Managerial career
- 2021–2024: Nice B
- 2023: Nice (caretaker)
- 2024–2026: Le Havre
- 2026–: Lens
- * Club domestic league appearances and goals

Didier Frédéric Thierry Digard (born 12 July 1986) is a French professional football manager and former player who is currently the head coach of Ligue 1 club Lens. As a player, he was a defensive midfielder.

== Club career ==
=== Le Havre ===
Digard started his career at Gisors Bézu, joining the academy at six years old. Digard revealed he began playing football around the time when Marseille was crowned European Champion. He stayed at the academy until eleven when the Le Havre's academy invited him to a tournament and trained with the club. Digard impressed the Le Havre's academy that they offered him a contract, leading him to join the club at age twelve. While progressing through the academy, Digard revealed that he had a behaviour problems, getting into fights but the club's then coach Mohamed Sall convinced him to stay and later credited him for understanding and believing in him. Digard started out playing as a striker before playing in a defensive midfield, a position he played throughout his career. Digard progressed through the club's academy before turning professional at eighteen.

On 29 October 2004, Digard made his debut for the club in a 1–0 win over Dijon, making his only appearance of the season and in his first season, he made 15 league appearances. In his second season, Digard scored his first goal against Dijon in a 2–1 win on 31 March 2006. In the next game on 7 April 2006, Digard scored his second goal against Grenoble in a 4–1 win. In his third season, Digard scored his third goal in a 2–0 win over Tours on 12 January 2007. He played over 70 league games for the club.

=== Paris Saint-Germain ===
In June 2007, Digard was strongly linked with a move from Le Havre to the Premier League clubs, with Aston Villa, Reading and West Ham United interested. However, he eventually opted to stay in France, and signed a three-year deal with Ligue 1 club Paris Saint-Germain (PSG) on 3 July 2007 for a transfer fee of €2.5 million. Upon joining the club, manager Paul Le Guen said: "I had one look at Digard and instantly decided that he was the right sort of player for us. He still has a lot to learn but he definitely has potential. It is up to him to exploit his potential and it is up to us to help him develop it."

Digard made his debut for PSG in their opening match of the season, in a draw against Sochaux on 4 August 2007. He started well for the side, playing in the defensive midfield position at the first team. However, injuries and lack of first team opportunities plagued his time at the club, leading to a frustrating spell at the club. Despite this, Digard went on to make nineteen appearances for the side.

Digard voiced his frustration over his delayed move to Boro and blamed the club's board's "incompetence" for the delay. This resulted in his suspension by PSG. Despite leaving the club on bad terms, Digard, nevertheless, said: "It was a milestone in my career, a great springboard. Despite the long injury I experienced there, I retain a lot of positive, it is an adventure that has brought me a lot in life."

=== Middlesbrough ===
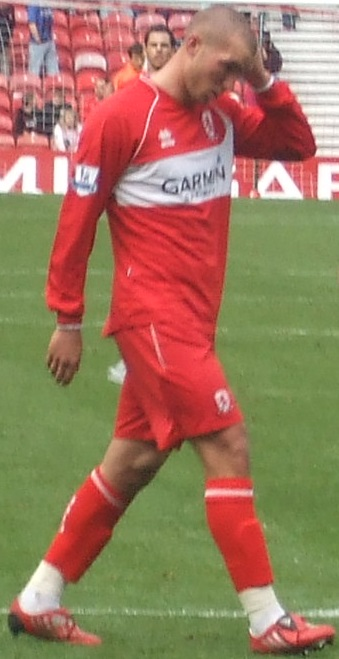
Digard pictured during his time at Middlesbrough.

On 4 July 2008, Digard signed for Middlesbrough on a four-year contract after the club agreed a €5 million (£4 million) deal with PSG. Boro had targeted him since June 2008. In the process of signing with Middlesbrough, Digard rejected overtures move from Portsmouth and Monaco. Upon joining the club, he said about the move: "I actually like the challenge. I like English football because it is physically challenging and that suits my game, so I'm not really scared. I'm looking forward to it and I can't wait to start playing and to start getting into the challenge. In midfield I have to help stop the other team's forwards and relaunch the game, so that we can counter-attack. I think to be physical, that's a quality, not a bad thing. You can have technical players, people who are mentally able, but to make a team complete you must have people who are strong."

Digard made his Middlesbrough debut during the first fixture of the 2008–09 Premier League season replacing Tuncay in the 72nd minute in the 2–1 victory against Tottenham Hotspur at the Riverside Stadium. He made his first contribution of note in the 86th minute of the same game, when his wayward shot turned into an assist when it was deflected goalwards by Mido, a goal which turned out to be the winner. In a match against Yeovil Town in the League Cup, Digard scored a 30-yard goal and the score ended up 5–1 to Middlesbrough. After another substitute appearance in the 2–1 away defeat to Liverpool, he, once again, came off the bench in the 2–1 home win against Stoke City, which his misfire shot turned into an assist, with the ball falling to Tuncay to score the winner. During a 2–1 loss against Portsmouth on 13 September 2008, Digard suffered a knee injury and had to be substituted in the 70th minute. But he quickly returned to training shortly after. Since joining the club, Digard was involved in the first team for the side, playing in the midfield position. However, in mid–December, he suffered a groin injury that kept him for almost a month. On 10 January 2009 Digard returned from injury, starting a match before being substituted in the 65th minute, in a 1–1 draw against Sunderland. However, on 17 January 2009, Digard was sent off against West Bromwich Albion for a tackle on Borja Valero, resulting a 3–0 loss. After a serving three match suspension, he made his return on 7 February 2009, starting the match before being substituted in the 60th minute, in a 1–0 loss against Manchester City. But his return was short–lived when in a 0–0 draw against Wigan on 21 February 2009, Digard was involved in a challenge by Lee Cattermole and was stretchered off midway through the first half suffering an injury to his medial ligaments in his right knee as well as a rupture to the quadriceps muscle in his left leg. During the same month, Digard insisted in an interview that he had no regrets about his move to Middlesbrough, having settled at Middlesbrough. Following the three-month injury lay-off, Digard returned to the team squad as an unused substitute in a 0–0 draw against Fulham on 18 April 2009. On 26 April 2009, Digard returned to action, coming on a substitute for Tony McMahon after 73 minutes in a 2–0 loss against Arsenal. At the end of the season, Middlesbrough were relegated to the Championship after 11 successive years in the Premier League. At the end of the 2008–09 season, he went on to make twenty–one appearances in all competitions.

Digard made his first appearance of the 2009–10 season against Sheffield United in the opening game of the season, starting a match before being substituted in the 42nd minute, as they drew 0–0. However, during the match, he suffered a groin strain that kept him out for a month. On 19 September 2009 Digard returned to the first team as a substitute, in a 5–0 loss against West Bromwich Albion. In a match against Derby County on 20 October 2009, he set up a goal for Adam Johnson, who scored twice, in a 2–0 win. However, Digard soon found his first team opportunities limited for the side, due to rotation change under the new management of Gordon Strachan. He soon faced his own injury concern along the way. By the time Digard departed Middlesbrough on loan, he made nine appearances for the side.

=== Nice ===
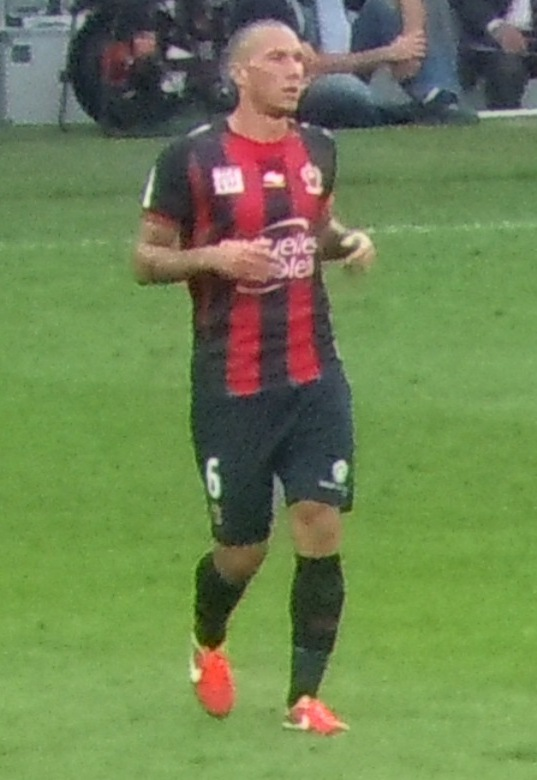
Digard playing for OGC Nice in a match against Valenciennes on 22 September 2013.

Digard joined French Ligue 1 club Nice on loan for six months on 8 January 2010, having been limited to 34 appearances for Middlesbrough due to a series of injuries. Upon joining the club, he said about the move: "I felt a real desire to get me to come from the coach, our discussions went very well. I'm the L1, I like watching a lot of matches on TV, I think Nice have a good team and that they deserve better than their current ranking. I know the style of this team and I think I can bring something more. I hope to pull them up by bringing the maximum of what I can do."

Two days later on 10 January 2010, Digard made his Nice debut in the first round of the Coupe de France against Stade Plabennécois, starting the match before being substituted in the 73rd minute, in a 2–1 loss. Six days later on 16 January 2010, he made his league debut for the club, starting the match before being substituted in the 82nd minute, in a 1–0 loss against Montpellier. On 30 January 2010, Digard scored his first goal in a 3–2 loss against Monaco. It was his first goal since 2007. For his performance, he was named the club's January Player of the Month and another one for the club's February Player of the Month. Since joining the club, Digard quickly became a first team regular for the side, playing in the midfield position. However, he suffered a thigh injury that kept him out for the rest of the 2009–10 season. Despite this, Digard went on to make thirteen appearances and scoring once in all competitions.

Upon returning to Middlesbrough in the summer, Digard was told by manager Gordon Strachan that he was surplus to requirements and should seek a move elsewhere. He rejoined Nice on loan in August 2010 for the rest of the 2010–11 season with a view to making the move permanent. Digard's first game after signing for the club on a permanent basis came on 12 September 2010 against Bordeaux, where he came on as a substitute in early second half and set up the club's second goal of the game, in a 2–1 win. After suffering injuries over the next three months, Digard made his return from injury, coming on as a late substitute, in a 1–0 win over Marseille on 5 December 2010. Since returning from injury, he regained his first team place for the side. During a 1–0 win over Arles-Avignon on 22 December 2010, Digard suffered a stomach problem that saw him substituted in the 38th minute. Despite, he returned to the starting line-up, in a 2–0 loss against Lille on 15 January 2011. After suffering an injury, he returned to the starting line-up against Lyon on 3 April 2011, captain the side for the second time against the club (having captained the first time on 23 January 2011 against Lyon in the second round of the Coupe de France), in a 2–2 draw. At the end of the 2010–11 season, Digard went on to make twenty–eight appearances in all competitions.

Having featured regularly throughout the campaign, a deal was agreed between both clubs, and Digard completed his permanent transfer in July 2011 for an undisclosed fee on a three-year contract. Digard expressed his hope to get his career back on track at Nice following difficult experiences at Paris Saint-Germain and Middlesbrough and to return to the France national side. "Didier will play in front of the defence," said manager Eric Roy, "this is a pivotal position in modern football and he has all the qualities to do so."

Ahead of the 2011–12 season, Digard was given a new captain role. Digard's first game after signing for the club on a permanent basis came in the opening game of the season, playing in the centre–back position, in a 3–1 loss against Lyon. He then established himself in the starting eleven for the side, playing in the midfield positions. As the captain of Nice, Digard spoke out about the development and his role as captain at the club throughout the season. However, he suffered two injuries for the next months. On 17 December 2011 Digard came on as a substitute in the 74th minute in a 2–0 against Valenciennes. However, he suffered an injury in the 20th minute of the first half and had to be substituted, as Nice lost 1–0 against Montpellier on 28 January 2012. After missing one match, Digard made his return to the starting line-up, where he started the match and resumed his role as captain, in a 0–0 draw against Paris Saint-Germain on 12 February 2012. He then set up a goal for Abraham Gneki Guié to score the club's second goal of the game, in a 2–1 win over Bordeaux on 3 March 2012. He then moved to playing in the centre–back position since late March. This lasted until on 7 May 2012 against Toulouse when Digard moved to the centre–midfield position. The remaining two matches of the 2011–12 season saw Digard set up two goals that saw Nice finish in thirteenth place in the league. At the end of the 2011–12 season, he went on to make thirty–three appearances in all competitions.

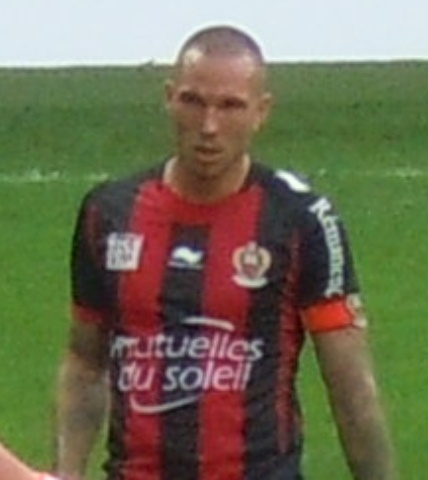
Digard playing for Nice.

The 2012–13 season saw Digard continuing to remain as the club's captain and regaining his first team place for the side. On 15 September 201 he helped the side earn their first league win of the season, in a 4–2 win against Brest. In a match against Bastia on 29 September 2012, Digard set up a goal for Darío Cvitanich to score the club's opening goal of the game, in a 2–2 draw. In early–November, he captained the club to go on an eight unbeaten streak in the league. The streak ended when Nice lost 3–0 against Lyon on 22 December 2012. This was followed up by scoring his first goal of the season, in a 5–0 win against Valenciennes on 13 January 2013. However, during a 1–0 loss against Bordeaux on 27 January 2013, Digard suffered a leg injury in the 13th minute and had to be substituted as a result. While on a two weeks sidelined, he was named the club's Player of the Month for January. After missing two matches, on 16 February 2013, he returned from injury, starting the 1–0 win against Bastia. For his return performance, Digard was named L’Equipe's Team of the Week. On 14 April 2013 he scored his second goal of the season in a 3–0 win against Sochaux. He captained the side to finishing fourth place in the league, successfully qualifying for European football next season. For his performance, he was named the club's Player of the Month for April. At the end of the 2012–13 season, Digard went on to make forty appearances and scoring two times in all competitions.

Ahead of the 2013–14 season, Digard signed a contract extension with the club, keeping him until 2015, with his contract expected to expire at the end of the season. Since then, Digard continued to remain as the club's captain and regaining his first team place for the side. He played and captained the side in both legs of the UEFA Europa League, as Nice lost 2–1 on aggregate against Apollon Limassol. Digard later stated in an interview that his only regret was not winning against Apollon Limassol. Digard then captained the side go on a five match unbeaten streak from 17 August 2013 to 22 September 2013. During which, he was the last captain to play at Stade du Ray before playing in a new stadium. His performance against Lille and Valenciennes resulted in him being named L'Equipe Team of the Week. On 5 January 2014 Digard scored his first goal of the season in a 2–0 win against Nantes in the first round of the Coupe de France. Ten days later on 15 January 2014, he scored against them for the second time, in a 4–3 loss in the quarter–finals of the Coupe de la Ligue. Digard suffered a calf injury in the 40th minute and was substituted, as Nice lost 2–1 on 8 February 2014. Up until his injury, he played in every match for the club since the start of the season. On 22 March 2014 Digard returned to the first team, coming on as a substitute in the 62nd minute in a 1–1 draw against Bordeaux. Two weeks later on 6 April 2014, his return was short–lived when he was sent–off for a second bookable offence, in a 1–1 draw against Saint-Étienne, resulting in him serving a one match suspension. After returning to the first team, Digard suffered a calf injury that kept him out for the rest of the 2013–14 season. Throughout the 2013–14 season, the club found themselves battling for relegation, which saw them avoided it by finishing seventeenth place. At the end of the season, he went on to make thirty–five appearances and scoring once in all competitions.

At the start of the 2014–15 season, however, Digard made his 150th appearance for the club, in a 3–2 win over Toulouse in the opening game of the season. But he was sidelined with injury that kept him sidelined for a month. On 27 September 2014 he returned to the first team, coming on as a 75th-minute substitute, in a 1–0 win against Monaco. Digard then set up a goal for Carlos Eduardo, who went on to score five times in a match, in a 7–2 win against Guingamp on 26 October 2014. Shortly after, he, once again, suffered a muscle injury that kept him out for almost two months. On 14 December 2014 Digard came on as a 67th-minute substitute in a 0–0 draw against Saint-Étienne. Once again, his return was short–lived when he suffered a calf injury that kept him out for two months. On 21 March 2015 Digard returned from injury, starting a 2–1 win against Lyon. During a match, he suffered an injury and had to be substituted in the 63rd minute; resulting being sidelined once again. On 18 April 2015 Digard again returned from injury, coming on in the 56th minute in a 3–1 loss against Paris Saint-Germain. Following this, Digard regained his first team place for the remaining matches of the season. He then scored his first goal of the season, in a 2–1 win against Lens on 16 May 2015. At the end of the 2014–15 season, Digard went on to make sixteen appearances and scoring once in all competitions, having helped the club finish in eleventh place in the league. It was announced on 27 May 2015 that the club announced the departure of Digard, whose contract expired at the end of the 2014–15 season.

=== Betis ===
On 8 July 2015, Digard signed a three-year deal with Real Betis, newly promoted to La Liga.

However, Digard suffered injuries during the club's pre–season that saw him miss the opening game of the season. On 29 August 2015 he made his Real Betis debut, coming on as a 52nd-minute substitute in a 5–0 loss against Real Madrid. His return was short–lived when Digard suffered another injury while training behind close doors. On 24 October 2015 he returned to the first team, coming on as a late substitute in a 1–1 draw against Granada. After an injury of Alfred N'Diaye, Digard was given his first Real Betis start, where he played 45 minutes before being substituted at half time, in a 1–0 win against Málaga on 7 November 2015. In a follow–up match against Atlético Madrid, he was given his second start for Real Betis, starting the whole game, in a 1–0 loss. Later in the 2015–16 season, Digard continued to be plagued with injuries and being placed on the substitute bench. At the end of the 2015–16 season, he appeared in only eight matches for his new club during the seasons, with two rare starts. Digard reflected his time in his first season at Real Betis, saying: "Unfortunately I hurt myself just before the first league game and as the team was going well, it was difficult to replay. After I found my place because the results were worse, but we then changed the coach who had another vision, he unfortunately did not make me play much. These are things that happen in a career."

Ahead of the 2016–17 season, Digard was linked a move away from Real Betis, with a return move to France after Angers had a bid for him rejected. Instead, on 31 August 2016, Digard was loaned to fellow top-tier club Osasuna, for one year. However, he suffered a muscle injury at training that kept him out for a month. On 17 October 2016 Digard made his CA Osasuna debut, starting before being substituted in the 71st minute, in a 3–2 win against Eibar. Digard made two more starts until he ruptured his cruciate ligament during a 1–1 draw against Athletic Bilbao on 31 October 2016. It was announced that Digard was sidelined between six and eight months following a successful surgery Following this, he never played for the club for the rest of the 2016–17 season and went on to make three appearances for the side.

A year later on 31 August 2017, Digard terminated his contract at Betis who thanked him for his services to the club. It came after when the club's president Ángel Haro told Digard that he was no longer feature in the first team plan ahead of the 2017–18 season.

=== Lorca ===
It was announced on 8 January 2018 Digard signed for Lorca in the Spanish Segunda División for the rest of the season, having spent four months as a free agent. However, he suffered a set-back to his Lorca's career after suffering an injury that kept him out for a month.

Digard made his Lorca debut on 11 February 2018, starting a match before being substituted in the 82nd minute, in a 3–0 loss against Reus Deportiu. He made three more starts for the side. However, Digard continued to be plagued with injuries for the next two months at the club. On 11 May 2018 he returned to the first team, coming on as a substitute in the 74th minute in a 2–1 win against Numancia. By the end of the 2017–18 season, Digard made six appearances for the side. Following this, he was released by the club after being banned for playing in the third tier, due to not meeting the economic requirements.

In October 2018, he trialled with Ligue 2 side Paris FC for several weeks, but the club decided not to sign him, stating they needed players who would be "physically ready" soon.

== International career ==
Having previously represented the national team youth side, Digard later played with the under-19 team and was part of the winning team at the 2005 UEFA European Under-19 Championship.

Digard played for the France U21, making eight appearances for the side. He later reflected about playing for the national youth team, saying: "It is a real pride to be one of the best French players, these are good times. I was there from 15 to 22 years old, it was great, I traveled, saw things ... It was the first time I went abroad ... these are just good memories."

His performance at Middlesbrough led then France Manager Raymond Domenech to be called up for a practice match following an injury crisis in October 2008. Digard later acknowledged about not playing for the national team, saying: "No, it is not a regret because the injuries did not allow me to really flourish, to really show my qualities. I really have no regrets, quite the contrary. When I see the guys of my generation who are there, I'm really happy."

== Managerial career ==
Following his retirement from professional football, Digard returned to Nice, where he was appointed as the club's assistant for the U17 side. In 2021, he was appointed as manager of the club's reserve team in the Championnat National 3.

On 9 January 2023, he was made Nice's interim manager following Lucien Favre's dismissal earlier that day. His first game in charge was a 6–1 win over Montpellier.

== Personal life ==
Digard revealed that he became a first time father when he was sixteen. Digard commented that being a first time father at age sixteen made him become responsible and serious. Digard is married and together, they have three children.

In addition to speaking French, Digard speaks English. In March 2016, his brother, David, was killed in a car accident. At the time of his death, David worked as a restaurateur.

Digard became an honorary president for EF Gisors-Béz.

== Managerial statistics ==
As of match played 21 November 2026

Managerial record by team and tenure
Team	From	To	Record							
Team	From	To	G	W	D	L	GF	GA	GD	Win %
Nice (caretaker)	10 January 2023	30 June 2023	25	12	8	5	39	23	+16	48.00
Le Havre	1 July 2024	31 October 2026	78	17	20	41	80	136	−56	21.79
Lens	13 November 2026	Present	1	0	1	0	1	1	+0	0.00
Total			104	29	29	46	120	160	−40	27.88

== Honours ==
Paris Saint-Germain

- Coupe de la Ligue: 2007–08
- Coupe de France runner-up: 2007–08

France U19

- UEFA European Under-19 Championship: 2005
