= Le Havre AC =

Association football club in France

Le Havre
- Full name: Le Havre Athletic Club
- Nicknames: Le Club Doyen (The Dean Club); Les Ciel et Marine (The Sky-and-Navy)
- Short name: HAC
- Founded: 1884; 142 years ago (sports club); 1894; 132 years ago (football section)
- Stadium: Stade Océane
- Capacity: 25,178
- Owner: Blue Crow Sports Group
- President: Jeff Luhnow
- Head coach: Valérien Ismaël
- League: Ligue 1
- 2025–26: Ligue 1, 14th of 18
- Website: hac.football
Home colours	Away colours	Third colours

Le Havre Athletic Club (French pronunciation: [lə ɑvʁ]) is a French professional association football club based in Le Havre, Normandy. The football club was founded in 1894 as a section of the sports club of the same name, founded in 1884. Le Havre plays in Ligue 1, the first tier of French football, after securing promotion from Ligue 2 as winners of the 2022–23 season, and plays its home matches at the Stade Océane.

Le Havre AC home stadium Stade Océane

Le Havre made its football debut in France's first championship in 1899, and on its debut became the first French club outside Paris to win the league. The club won the league the following season in 1900. Le Havre has yet to win the current first division of French football, Ligue 1, yet they won the second division, Ligue 2, for a record of six times. The club's highest honour to date was winning the Coupe de France, in 1959.

The main rivalries of Le Havre are the "Derby Normand" with SM Caen and an always heated clash with Lens, located in the region of Nord-Pas-de-Calais.

== History ==
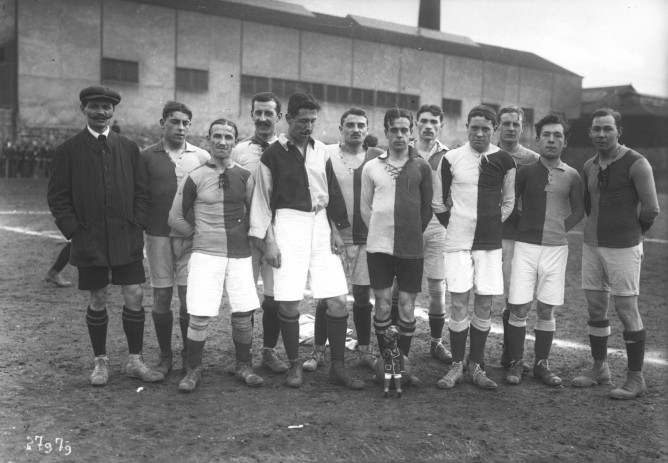
HAC in Tournoi de Pâques 1913

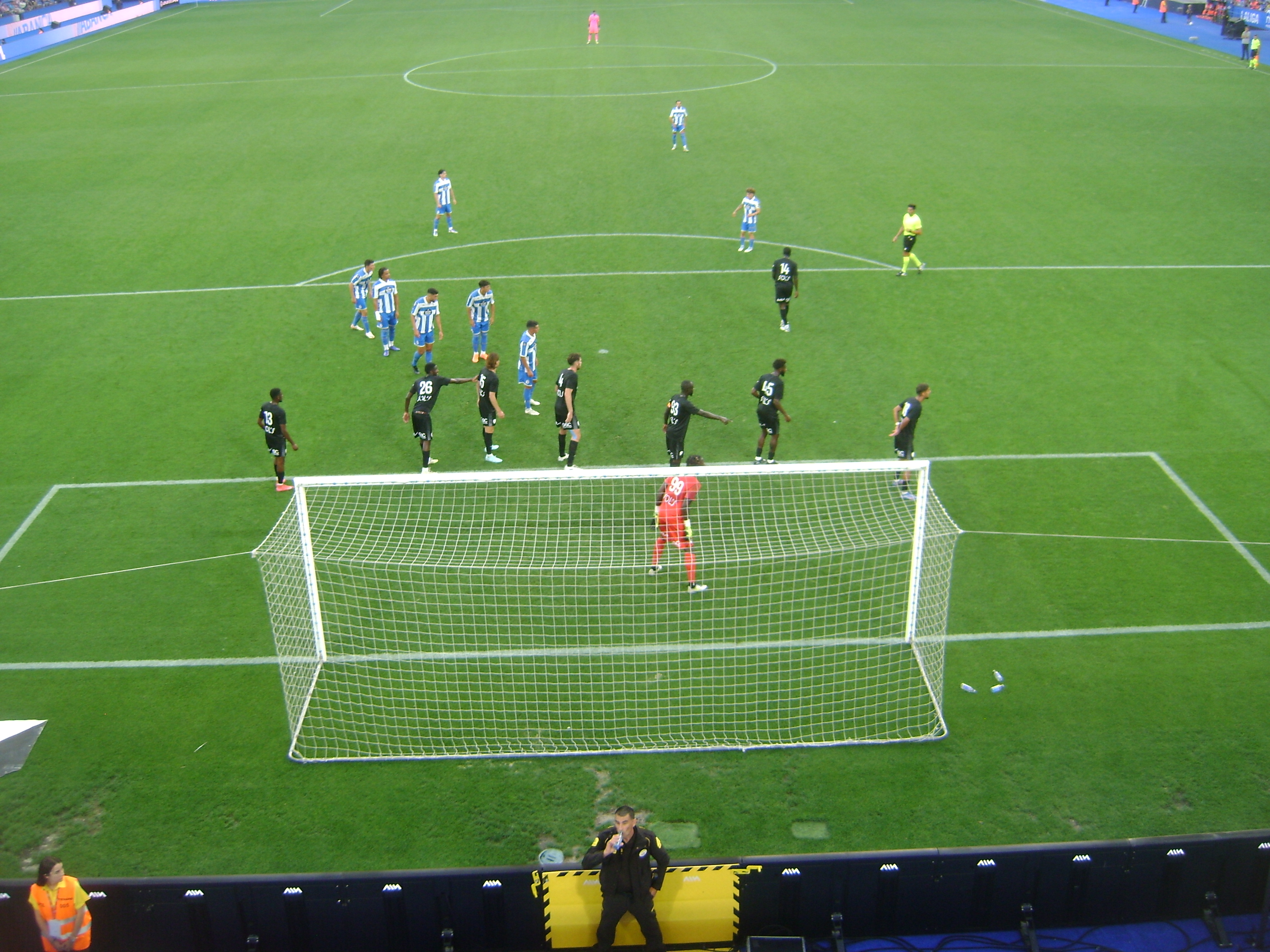
Deportivo de La Coruña vs. Le Havre.

Contrary to what the club has long claimed, Le Havre AC was not founded in 1872. It was in 1884 that a group of British residents formed Le Havre Athlétique, which played a hybrid form of football, a cross between rugby and association football, called "combination". Association football began being played in Le Havre in 1894.

In 1899, Le Havre became the first club from outside Paris to become French football champions. At the time the championship was organised by the USFSA. After being awarded a win over Iris Club Lillois in the semi-final by walkover, they were awarded the title after also receiving a walkover in the final against Club Français. They would also win the following year, with the final being a "re-match" of the forfeited 1899 final.

The club has a youth investment program,. A large amount of young players have gone on to play at international level including Benjamin Mendy, Ibrahim Ba, Jean-Alain Boumsong, Lassana Diarra, Riyad Mahrez, Steve Mandanda, Vikash Dhorasoo, Paul Pogba, and Dimitri Payet.

The club was on the receiving end of some high-profile illegal transfers, by which Charles N'Zogbia, Matthias Lepiller and Paul Pogba were signed by other clubs, allegedly without the proper compensation being paid. The first two were arbitrated by FIFA, who ordered Newcastle United and Fiorentina to pay training compensation.

In the 2022–23 Ligue 2, Le Havre finished top of the league table to win their sixth title in the division and secure promotion to the Ligue 1 for the first time since 2008.

== Club culture ==
Le Havre is known as 'les ciel et marine' in France, which translates as 'the sky and navy blues'. These colours were chosen by the club's English founders as they were those of their alma maters, the universities of Cambridge and Oxford: the anthem of the club is played to the melody of "God Save the King" to mark the English origins of the club:

"A jamais le premier
de tous les clubs français
ô H.A.C.
Fiers de tes origines
Fils d'Oxford et Cambridge
deux couleurs font notre prestige
Ciel et marine!"

English translation:

"The first ever
of all French clubs
The H.A.C
Proud of your roots
Son of Oxford and Cambridge
two colours make our prestige
(the colours of the) sky and the sea!"

== Players ==
=== Current squad ===
As of 16 September 2026

No.	Pos.	Nation	Player
5	DF	ALG	Ahmed Touba (on loan from Panathinaikos)
6	MF	FRA	Junior Mwanga
7	MF	MAR	Amir Richardson (on loan from Fiorentina)
9	FW	NGR	Josh Maja
10	MF	SUI	Felix Mambimbi
12	DF	DEN	Elias Jelert (on loan from Galatasaray)
14	MF	SEN	Rassoul Ndiaye
15	DF	JPN	Ayumu Seko
16	GK	BEL	Arnaud Bodart (on loan from Lille)
17	MF	JPN	Kaito Mizuta
19	FW	FRA	Joan Tincres
20	DF	FRA	Djibril Ouziad
23	DF	FRA	Vincent Sasso
24	MF	CIV	Guy-Noël Zohouri

No.	Pos.	Nation	Player
25	FW	TAN	Mbwana Samatta
26	MF	FRA	Simon Ebonog
27	FW	FRA	Enzo Koffi
29	DF	FRA	Stephan Zagadou
30	FW	JPN	Sōta Nakamura (on loan from Sanfrecce Hiroshima)
32	DF	FRA	Timothée Pembélé
38	FW	CIV	Rayan Fofana (on loan from Lens)
44	MF	FRA	Ismaïl Bouneb
50	GK	FRA	Paul Argney
77	GK	COD	Lionel Mpasi
78	MF	FRA	Daren Mosengo
93	GK	FRA	Gauthier Gallon
—	FW	FRA	Élysée Logbo

=== Out on loan ===
Note: Flags indicate national team as defined under FIFA eligibility rules; some limited exceptions apply. Players may hold more than one non-FIFA nationality.

No.	Pos.	Nation	Player
—	FW	FRA	Noam Obougou (at Nancy until 30 June 2027)

== Honours ==
=== Nationals ===
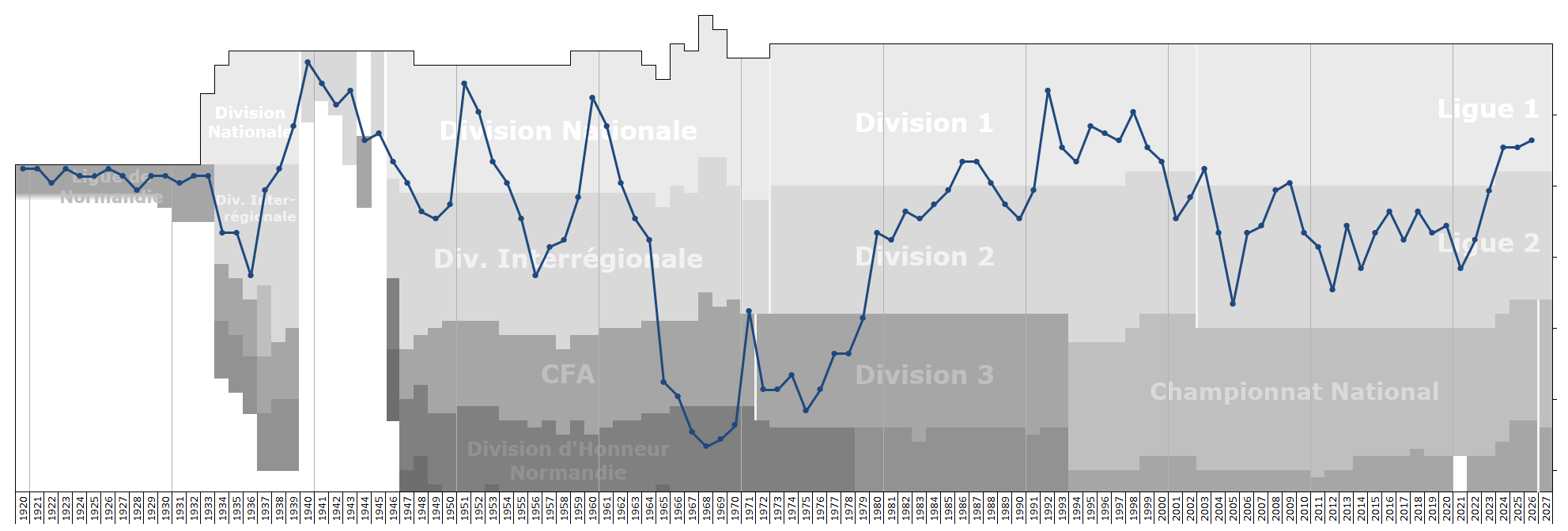
Historical league performance chart of Le Havre AC

- Ligue 2 (French 2nd Division)
  - Winners (6): 1938, 1959, 1985, 1991, 2008, 2023
  - Runners-up (1): 1950
- Coupe de France (French Cup)
  - Winners (1): 1959
  - Runners-up (1): 1920
- Trophée des champions (French Super Cup)
  - Winners (1): 1959

=== Friendlies ===
- USFSA Championnat
  - Winners (3): 1898–99, 1899–1900, 1918–19
- Challenge International du Nord
  - Winners (1): 1900
- Coupe Nationale
  - Winners (2): 1918, 1919

== Club staff ==
Name and Nationality		Position
Jean-Michel Roussier	(France)	President
Christopher Sargent	(United States)	Vice-President
Steve O'Connor	(United States)	Technical director
Ashton Smith	(United States)	Sporting director
Bruce Fallon	(United States)	Sports coordinator
Didier Digard	(France)	Head coach
Bryan Bergougnoux	(France)	Assistant coach
Gauthier Duchert	(France)	First-team coach
Christophe Hoarau	(France)	Goalkeeper coach
Jean Luc Pierrot	(France)	Video analyst
Stéphane Meunier	(France)	Video analyst
Corentin Rousseau	(France)	Video analyst
Jules Delacroix	(France)	Doctor
Auguste LeBlanc	(France)	Academy Goalkeeping Co-ordinator
Grégory Proment	(France)	Academy manager

== Managerial history ==
- George Kimpton (1921–26)
- Mac Burgess (1934–35)
- George McLachlan (1935–36)
- Josef "Pépi" Schneider (1936–39)
- George Kimpton (1945–46)
- Jean Cornelli (1946–47)
- Roger Magnin (1948–49)
- Jules Bigot (1950–52)
- Elek Schwartz (1952–53)
- René Bihel (1953–54)
- Edmond Delfour (1954–55)
- Roger Magnin (1955–56)
- Théo Bisson (1956–57)
- Lucien Jasseron (1957–62)
- Eduardo Di Loreto (1962–63)
- Arie Devroedt (1963–64)
- Christian Villenave (1964–66)
- Max Schirschin (1970–71)
- Gino Corlani (1971–72)
- Fredo Garel (1972–73)
- Léonce Lavagne (1973–74)
- Edmond Baraffe (1974–76)
- Léonce Lavagne (1976–82)
- Yves Herbet (1982–83)
- Didier Notheaux (1983–88)
- Pierre Mankowski (1988–93)
- Guy David (1993–96)
- René Exbrayat (1996–97)
- Denis Troch (1997 – Oct 98)
- Joël Beaujouan (Oct 1998–99)
- Francis Smerecki (1999–00)
- Joël Beaujouan (2000)
- Thierry Uvenard, Philippe Sence and Bruno Baronchelli (Dec 2000)
- Jean-François Domergue (Dec 2000–04)
- Philippe Hinschberger (2004 – April 2005)
- Thierry Uvenard (April 2005–07)
- Jean-Marc Nobilo (2007–08)
- Frédéric Hantz (2008–09)
- Cédric Daury (2009 – Nov 2012)
- Christophe Revault (Nov 2012 – Dec 2012)
- Erick Mombaerts (Dec 2012 – Dec 2014)
- Thierry Goudet (Dec 2014 – Sept 2015)
- Bob Bradley (Nov 2015 – Oct 2016)
- Oswald Tanchot (Oct 2016 – May 2019)
- Paul Le Guen (May 2019 – June 2022)
- Luka Elsner (June 2022 – June 2024)
- Didier Digard (July 2024–November 2026)
- Valérien Ismaël (November 2026–present)
