= Marcel Marchal =

French footballer

Personal information
- Full name: Marcel Pierre Marchal
- Date of birth: 2 June 1913
- Place of birth: Montigny-lès-Metz, France
- Date of death: 31 July 1993 (aged 80)
- Place of death: Verdun, France
- Height: 1.78 m (5 ft 10 in)
- Position: Midfielder

Senior career*
Years	Team	Apps	(Gls)
1929–1933	AS Messine		
1933–1939	FC Metz	143	(3)
1942–1943	Olympic Charleroi	11	(0)
1945–1946	FC Metz	10	(0)

International career
1938	France	1	(0)
- * Club domestic league appearances and goals

Marcel Pierre Marchal (2 June 1913 – 31 July 1993) was a French footballer who played as a midfielder for FC Metz and the French national team in the 1930s.

== Playing career ==
=== Club career ===
Marcel Marchal was born on 2 June 1913 in Montigny-lès-Metz, in the Lorraine region, a short distance from the capital Metz, which at the time, belonged to the German Empire. He began his football career at his hometown club AS Messine in the early 1930s, where he quickly establish himself as a starter, playing a crucial role in helping the Messine team win the 1930 and 1932 Lorraine Football League. but following its relegation in 1933, the Messine club, which was also plagued by significant debts, decided to resume discussions for a merger with FC Metz, which was practically completed, but ended up being suspended for the following season; in the meantime, however, three players left ASM for FC Metz: Marchal, Nicolas Hibst, and Camille Roger.

Together with Albert Rohrbacher, Charles Fosset, and Charles Zehren, Marchal played a crucial role in helping Metz win 1934–35 French Division 2, thus achieve promotion to Ligue 1, and then reaching the national cup final in 1938, which ended in a 1–2 loss to league runners-up Olympique Marseille.

During the outbreak of the Second World War, several Metz players, such as Marchal, Hibst, and Roger Flucklinger, were mobilized for the front, joining the 162nd Infantry Regiment. When his home region was incorporated into Germany, Metz lost its professional status, being renamed Fußball Verein Metz and joining the German league; in 1941, he played four matches for Metz in the DFB-Pokal. He also played for Olympic Charleroi in the DFB-Pokal.

After the War ended in 1945, the 32-year-old Marchal returned to Metz, where he played one more season before retiring in 1946. In total, he scored 4 goals in 180 official matches, including 3 goals in 153 league matches, and 1 goal in 27 Coupe de France matches.

=== International career ===
On 30 January 1938, the 24-year-old Marchal earned his first international cap in a friendly match against the Belgium at the Parc des Princes, helping his side to a 5–3 win.

== Death ==
Marchal died in Verdun on 31 July 1993, at the age of 80.

== Honours ==
AS Messine

- Lorraine Football League
  - Champions (2): 1930 and 1932

FC Metz

- Ligue 2
  - Champions (1): 1934–35
- Coupe de France
  - Runner-up (1): 1938

== Bibliography ==
- Lonchamp, Jacques (2022). Les Débuts Du Football Professionnel À Metz (1932-1938) [The Beginnings of Professional Football in Metz (1932-1938)] (in French). Paris: JALON. p. 96. ISBN 978-2-491-06834-9.
