= Jahyann Pandore =

French footballer (born 2007)

Personal information
- Date of birth: 25 November 2007 (age 18)
- Place of birth: Gonesse, France
- Position: Midfielder

Team information
- Current team: Metz
- Number: 21

Youth career
- –2022: Bondy
- 2022–2025: Metz

Senior career*
| Years | Team | Apps | (Gls) |
| 2025– | Metz B | 18 | (5) |
| 2026– | Metz | 4 | (1) |
- * Club domestic league appearances and goals as of 23:05, 17 May 2026 (UTC)

Jahyann Pandore (born 25 November 2007) is a French professional footballer who plays as a midfielder for Ligue 2 club Metz.

== Career ==
In the 2025–26 season, Pandore established himself as a regular in Metz's reserve side in the Championnat National 3. On 19 April 2026, he made his professional debut in a Ligue 1 match against Paris FC, an eventual 3–1 defeat. In his second Ligue 1 appearance one week later, he scored a goal in a 4–4 draw against Le Havre.

== Style of play ==
A versatile player capable of playing both as an attacking or box-to-box midfielder, Pandore is described as having a high work rate, quick thinking, and a strong weak foot. His Metz manager Benoît Tavenot described him as a player with "solid footwork" and an "ability to play the ball out from the back under pressure."

== Career statistics ==
As of match played 17 May 2026

Appearances and goals by club, season and competition
| Club | Season | League | | | National cup | | Other | | Total | |
| Club | Season | Division | Apps | Goals | Apps | Goals | Apps | Goals | Apps | Goals |
|---|---|---|---|---|---|---|---|---|---|---|
| Metz B | 2025–26 | National 3 | 18 | 5 | — | | — | | 18 | 5 |
| Metz | 2025–26 | Ligue 1 | 4 | 1 | 0 | 0 | — | | 4 | 1 |
| Career total | | | 22 | 6 | 0 | 0 | 0 | 0 | 22 | 6 |
