= Nathan Mbala =

French footballer (born 2008)

Personal information
- Date of birth: 19 February 2008 (age 18)
- Place of birth: Kinshasa, DR Congo
- Height: 1.79 m (5 ft 10 in)
- Positions: Centre-forward; winger

Team information
- Current team: Metz
- Number: 34

Youth career
- US Forbach
- 2020–2025: Metz

Senior career*
Years	Team	Apps	(Gls)
2024–2025	Metz B	17	(5)
2025–	Metz	13	(2)
- * Club domestic league appearances and goals as of 10 May 2026

Nathan Mbala (born 19 February 2008) is a French professional footballer who plays as a forward for Metz.

== Club career ==
Nathan Mbala was born in Kinshasa, DR Congo, before moving to Yverdon-les-Bains in Switzerland, where his father, Democratic Republic of the Congo international Biscotte Mbala, then played.

Mbala moved to France as a 4 years old, where he first played for US Forbach.

He then started playing for Metz in 2020 with the under-13. In July 2023, he officially joined the Metz Youth academy, where his older brother Bisnat Mbala already played.

Mbala started training with the first team in early 2025, making his unofficial first team debut during a mid-season friendly in March 2025. On the summer 2025, he made the pre-season with the first team and delivered an assist for Cléo Mélières during the first friendly against US Mondorf.

As he had established himself as a regular goalscorer for the National 3 reserve, Mbala made his professional debut with Metz in a 3–0 away Coupe de France win over ASC Biesheim on 20 December 2025. He replaced the starting captain Gauthier Hein in the last few minutes of the game. He then was regularly selected by Stéphane Le Mignan in the first-team Ligue 1 squad, while some of Metz's leaders where away playing the Africa Cup of Nations.

After making his Ligue 1 debut on 1st February 2026 against Angers, Mbala scored his first goal with the team two weeks later, in a 3–1 defeat to AJ Auxerre on 17 February 2026. Aged only 17 and 361 days, he became the third youngest goalscorer in the history of FC Metz, trailing only Babacar Gueye and Miralem Pjanić.

On 24 March 2026, Mbala signed his first contract with Metz, the youngster then appearing as one of the few bright spots of a team struggling to avoid relegation.

== Style of play ==
Having initially played as a goalkeeper, Mbala switched to outfield player during his youth years.

== Career statistics ==
As of match played 10 May 2026

Appearances and goals by club, season and competition
Club	Season	League			National cup		Other		Total	
Club	Season	Division	Apps	Goals	Apps	Goals	Apps	Goals	Apps	Goals
Metz B	2024–25	National 3	8	2	—		—		8	2
Metz B	2025–26	National 3	9	3	—		—		9	3
Metz B	Total		17	5	—		—		17	5
Metz	2025–26	Ligue 1	13	2	—		—		13	2
Career total			30	7	0	0	0	0	30	7
