= 2024–25 Ligue 2 =

French second division football league

Ligue 2
- Season: 2024–25
- Dates: 16 August 2024 – 10 May 2025
- Champions: Lorient
- Promoted: Lorient; Paris FC; Metz (via Play-off)
- Relegated: Ajaccio (due to financial reasons); Martigues (to Départmental 3); Caen
- Top goalscorer: Eli Junior Kroupi (22 goals)

The 2024–25 Ligue 2, commonly known as Ligue 2 BKT for sponsorship reasons, is the 86th season of Ligue 2. It began on 16 August 2024 and concluded on 10 May 2025.

== Teams ==
=== Changes ===
Red Star (promoted after 5 years of absence) and Martigues (promoted after 22 years of absence) returned to the second division. Since Ligue 2 reduced in size, 4 teams were relegated and only 2 promoted, so Troyes, Quevilly-Rouen, Concarneau, and Valenciennes were relegated (after 1, 3, 1, and 10 seasons in the second division respectively). Troyes has now been relegated in two consecutive seasons and Valenciennes had last been in the third division since 2004–05. From Ligue 1, Metz, Lorient and Clermont Foot have been relegated to Ligue 2 (after 1, 4 and 3 years in top tier respectively). Auxerre, Angers and Saint-Étienne were promoted to Ligue 1 after one-year absence for the first two and two-year absence for the last one.

On June 27, 2024, the Direction Nationale du Contrôle de Gestion (DNCG) decided to administratively downgrade Ajaccio to Championnat National by questioning the financial situation of the club, although it was profitable at the end of the 2022–2023 season. They appealed the decision, and on the 11th of July 2024, they were reinstated in Ligue 2 for the 2024–25 season.

Troyes were reinstated to Ligue 2 following a request approved by the DNCG.

In a repeat of the 2022 off-season, Bordeaux was administratively relegated to Championnat National in response to their financial struggles. This occurred following the failure of Fenway Sports Group's proposed takeover; although the club had initially appealed the decision, it later withdrew the appeal. With the club being required to present the DNCG with their budget prior to the start of the 2024–25 season, they could suffer a further demotion to the Championnat National 2.

On August 17th, 2024, Bordeaux's demotion to Championnat National 2 was confirmed by the French National Olympic and Sports Committee.

▲ from Championnat National	▲ to Ligue 1	▼ from Ligue 1	▼ to Championnat National	▼ to Championnat National 2
Red Star; Martigues	Auxerre; Angers; Saint-Étienne (play-off)	Metz (play-off); Lorient; Clermont	Quevilly-Rouen; Concarneau; Valenciennes	Bordeaux (administratively relegated)

=== Stadiums and locations ===
Location of teams in 2024–25 Ligue 2

Club	Location	Venue	Capacity
Ajaccio	Ajaccio	Stade Michel Moretti	10,446
Amiens	Amiens	Stade de la Licorne	12,097
Annecy	Annecy	Parc des Sports	15,660
Bastia	Bastia	Stade Armand Cesari	16,078
Caen	Caen	Stade Michel d'Ornano	21,215
Clermont	Clermont-Ferrand	Stade Gabriel Montpied	11,980
Dunkerque	Dunkerque	Stade Marcel Tribut	4,933
Grenoble	Grenoble	Stade des Alpes	20,068
Guingamp	Guingamp	Stade de Roudourou	18,378
Laval	Laval	Stade Francis Le Basser	18,607
Lorient	Lorient	Stade du Moustoir	18,890
Martigues	Martigues	Stade Francis Turcan	8,290
Metz	Longeville-lès-Metz	Stade Saint-Symphorien	28,786
Paris FC	Paris (Paris 13)	Stade Sébastien Charléty	19,151
Pau	Pau	Nouste Camp	4,031
Red Star	Paris (Saint-Ouen)	Stade Bauer	10,000
Rodez	Rodez	Stade Paul Lignon	5,955
Troyes	Troyes	Stade de l'Aube	21,684

=== Personnel and kits ===
Team	Manager	Captain	Kit manufacturer	Sponsors (front)	Sponsors (back)	Sponsors (sleeve)	Sponsors (shorts)	Sponsors (socks)
Ajaccio	(France) Thierry Debès (caretaker)	(France) Thomas Mangani	Adidas	Cullettività di Corsica-Collectivité de Corse, Gamm Vert	Madewis	Air Corsica, AZ Habitat	Ajaccio, Europcar	None
Amiens	(Senegal) Omar Daf	(France) Régis Gurtner	Puma	Intersport, Igol Lubrifiants, Gueudet	Igol Lubrifiants	None	Amiens Métropole, E.Leclerc Rivery	None
Annecy	(France) Laurent Guyot	(France) Jean-Jacques Rocchi	Adidas	MSC Cruises, Mediaco Vrac, TeamWork	Stgenergy, Nissan Groupe Maurin	Tissier Technique	LP Charpente, Burger King	None
Bastia	(France) Benoît Tavenot	(France) Christophe Vincent	Adidas	Oscaro Power, Corsica Ferries, Capembal, Roncaglia Blanchisserie, Collectivité de Corse, Coviag, Olivier Bleu, Smart Good Things, Casa di e Lingue	Payfoot, ESSE, Madewis	Groupe Actual, Asco6Tem	Burger King, Garage Corsa, CORSECARLOC	None
Caen	(Armenia) Michel Der Zakarian	(France) Romain Thomas	Kappa	Starwash (H)/Saint James Clothing (A), Künkel, Thalazur	Imprimerie NII, Guilloux	Carrefour Ouistreham	Crédit Agricole Normandie, Printngo Publicité	None
Clermont	(France) Sébastien Mazeyrat (caretaker)	(France) Johan Gastien	Uhlsport	Staffmatch, Puy-de-Dôme, Crédit Mutuel	Auvergne-Rhône-Alpes (H), Pingeon & Fils	Radio SCOOP	Systèmes Solaires	None
Dunkerque	(Portugal) Luís Castro	(Guinea-Bissau) Opa Sangante	Macron	Intersport, Dunkerque Communauté Urbaine, Topensi	DS Levage	2024 Vivre les JO #dunkerqueagglo Tous en bleu, blanc, rouge	Hauts-de-France, Onet	None
Grenoble	(France) Franck Rizzetto	(France) Jessy Bénet	Nike	Vinci Immobilier (H)/Carrefour Market (A), Carrefour (H)/Vinci Immobilier (A), Smart Good Things, Grenoble Alpes Métropole	Chamrousse, Le Cabanon en Provence	None	LCR	None
Guingamp	(France) Sylvain Ripoll	(France) Jérémy Livolant	Umbro	Celtigel, Creactuel, Breizh Cola, Ballay	Jardiman, Vital Concept	Cafés Coïc	Bernard Jarnoux Crêpier, Tibbloc	None
Laval	(France) Olivier Frapolli	(France) Jimmy Roye	Kappa	Lactel, La Mayenne Le Département, Laval Agglo	V and B Cave & Bar, Groupe Lucas, Mayenne	Groupe Actual	Laval Agglo, SEPAL, Aropiz	None
Lorient	(France) Olivier Pantaloni	(France) Laurent Abergel	Umbro	Jean Floc'h, Acadomia, Breizh Cola	KarrGreen, MA Pièces Autos Bretagne	Actual Group	BMW/Mousqueton, B&B Hotels	
Martigues	(France) Hakim Malek	(France) Samir Belloumou	Nike	Ford	IDEC Sport	Betson	None	
Metz	(France) Stéphane Le Mignan	(France) Matthieu Udol	Kappa	Car Avenue (H), MOSL Mosselle Sans Limite, Malezieux, Axia Interim	Technitoit, Nacon	Eurométropole de Metz	E.Leclerc Moselle, LCR	
Paris	(France) Stéphane Gilli	(Martinique) Cyril Mandouki	Adidas	Bahrain Victorious, Lycamobile	Vinci	None		
Pau	(France) Nicolas Usaï	(France) Antoine Batisse	Puma	Bullux Services, Pau, Casino de Pau, Intersport	Arobase Intérim, Brico Fenêtre, Iroise Bellevie	Bullux Services	Übi Care	None
Red Star	(France) Grégory Poirier	(France) Loïc Kouagba	Kappa	TRUST'iT	None			
Rodez	(France) Didier Santini	(France) Rémy Boissier	Adidas	Maxoutil, E.Leclerc	JeanStation, Thermatic, Ville de Rodez, Aveyron, Rodez Agglomération, Occitanie	aveyron.fr	Intersport, Maxoutil, Andrieu Construction	None
Troyes	(France) Stéphane Dumont	(France) Xavier Chevalerin	Le Coq Sportif	LCR (H), Troyes, norelem, Festilight	Sinfin, Amplitude Groupe Automobile	Century 21 Groupe Martinot	Huguier Frères	None

=== Managerial changes ===
Team	Outgoing manager	Manner of departure	Date of vacancy	Position in table	Incoming manager	Date of appointment
Red Star	(Senegal) Habib Beye	End of contract	8 May 2024	Pre-season	(France) Grégory Poirier	4 June 2024
Clermont	(France) Pascal Gastien	Resigned	13 May 2024	Pre-season	(Switzerland) Sébastien Bichard	1 July 2024
Guingamp	(France) Stéphane Dumont	End of contract	29 May 2024	Pre-season	(France) Sylvain Ripoll	29 May 2024
Lorient	(France) Régis Le Bris	Signed by Sunderland	22 June 2024	Pre-season	(France) Olivier Pantaloni	23 June 2024
Ajaccio	(France) Olivier Pantaloni	Signed by Lorient	23 June 2024	Pre-season	(France) Mathieu Chabert	2 July 2024
Metz	(Romania) László Bölöni	Sacked	4 July 2024	Pre-season	(France) Stéphane Le Mignan	4 July 2024
Troyes	(France) David Guion	Sacked	6 August 2024	Pre-season	(France) Stéphane Dumont	12 August 2024
Clermont	(Switzerland) Sébastien Bichard	Sacked	28 October 2024	14th	(France) Laurent Batlles	30 October 2024
Martigues	(France) Thierry Laurey	Sacked	16 December 2024	18th	(France) Hakim Malek	20 January 2025
Grenoble	(France) Oswald Tanchot	Sacked	18 December 2024	12th	(France) Franck Rizzetto	17 January 2025
Caen	(France) Nicolas Seube	Sacked	29 December 2024	16th	(Portugal) Bruno Baltazar	30 December 2024
Ajaccio	(France) Mathieu Chabert	Resigned	3 January 2025	17th	(France) Thierry Debès (caretaker)	3 January 2025
Caen	(Portugal) Bruno Baltazar	Sacked	18 February 2025	18th	(Armenia) Michel Der Zakarian	18 February 2025
Clermont	(France) Laurent Batlles	Sacked	7 April 2025	17th	(France) Sébastien Mazeyrat (caretaker)	7 April 2025

== League table ==
Pos	Team	Pld	W	D	L	GF	GA	GD	Pts	Promotion or Relegation
1	Lorient (C, P)	34	22	5	7	68	31	+37	71	Promotion to Ligue 1
2	Paris FC (P)	34	21	6	7	55	33	+22	69	Promotion to Ligue 1
3	Metz (O, P)	34	18	11	5	63	34	+29	65	Qualification for promotion play-offs final
4	Dunkerque	34	17	5	12	47	40	+7	56	Qualification for promotion play-offs semi-final
5	Guingamp	34	17	4	13	57	45	+12	55	Qualification for promotion play-offs semi-final
6	Annecy	34	14	9	11	42	42	0	51	
7	Laval	34	14	8	12	44	38	+6	50	
8	Bastia	34	11	15	8	43	37	+6	48	
9	Grenoble	34	13	7	14	43	44	−1	46	
10	Troyes	34	13	5	16	36	34	+2	44	
11	Amiens	34	13	4	17	38	50	−12	43	
12	Ajaccio (Note: Ajaccio were relegated due to financial reasons.) (D, R)	34	12	6	16	30	42	−12	42	Administrative relegation to Régional 2
13	Pau	34	10	12	12	39	53	−14	42	
14	Rodez	34	9	12	13	56	54	+2	39	
15	Red Star	34	9	11	14	37	51	−14	38	
16	Clermont (O)	34	7	12	15	30	46	−16	33	Qualification for relegation play-offs
17	Martigues (Note: Martigues were originally going to be relegated to Régional 1 as the DNCG excluded them from national competitions. However, Martigues were then relegated further down to Départemental 1, the ninth tier of French football, before eventually getting relegated once again down to Départemental 3, the eleventh tier) (D, R)	34	9	5	20	29	56	−27	32	Administrative relegation to Départemental 3
18	Caen (R)	34	5	7	22	31	58	−27	22	Relegation to Championnat National

Source: Ligue 2
Rules for classification: 1) Points; 2) Goal difference; 3) Number of goals scored; 4) Head-to-head goal difference; 5) Fair play points
(C) Champions; (D) Disqualified; (O) Play-off winners; (P) Promoted; (R) Relegated

== Results ==
Home \ Away	AJA	AMI	ANN	BAS	CAE	CLE	DUN	GRE	GUI	LAV	LOR	MTG	MET	PFC	PAU	RST	ROD	TRO
Ajaccio	—	2–1	1–2	0–0	2–1	2–0	1–2	2–0	0–3	3–0	2–1	1–1	0–1	0–2	1–1	2–1	1–0	2–1
Amiens	3–1	—	1–0	1–0	2–1	1–0	1–0	1–4	3–2	1–3	1–0	1–1	1–2	0–0	4–2	3–0	2–1	0–3
Annecy	2–0	3–0	—	1–1	1–0	2–0	0–2	3–1	1–4	2–0	0–0	2–4	0–0	2–3	2–0	1–0	1–1	1–0
Bastia	4–0	1–0	2–2	—	2–1	0–0	2–0	2–3	3–1	5–2	0–0	1–0	1–1	2–1	1–1	1–0	2–2	0–0
Caen	1–0	2–1	1–1	2–0	—	0–1	0–2	0–1	0–1	0–1	1–2	0–3	2–2	0–2	2–2	1–1	3–3	0–1
Clermont	0–1	1–1	3–2	1–1	0–1	—	0–1	0–0	4–1	1–1	2–1	0–1	1–1	0–1	2–2	1–1	1–1	0–2
Dunkerque	1–0	3–1	0–2	2–1	3–1	3–0	—	2–0	3–1	0–0	0–1	0–1	2–3	1–0	3–2	2–0	1–0	2–1
Grenoble	2–2	0–2	0–0	3–2	3–1	3–0	0–1	—	1–1	2–1	1–2	1–0	2–0	1–2	1–1	0–0	2–1	3–1
Guingamp	1–0	3–0	2–2	2–2	3–1	3–1	1–1	3–0	—	2–0	1–2	2–1	0–3	0–1	0–1	3–4	3–0	4–0
Laval	1–1	1–0	0–1	2–2	1–0	1–2	3–2	1–2	0–1	—	2–0	0–1	2–3	3–0	3–1	1–1	2–1	1–0
Lorient	3–0	3–1	4–2	4–0	4–0	3–2	4–2	2–0	3–1	0–1	—	5–1	0–0	2–0	5–0	2–1	3–1	2–0
Martigues	2–0	3–0	2–0	0–1	0–3	0–1	1–1	0–4	0–1	0–3	0–1	—	1–4	1–1	2–2	0–1	0–2	1–2
Metz	0–1	3–2	5–1	1–1	1–0	3–1	2–0	3–0	1–0	1–1	1–1	6–0	—	3–1	0–0	2–2	3–3	2–1
Paris FC	2–0	1–0	0–0	1–0	4–2	2–0	3–2	2–1	2–0	1–0	3–2	1–2	1–2	—	3–1	4–1	3–3	1–0
Pau	1–0	0–2	1–0	1–1	1–0	2–2	1–1	1–0	1–3	1–1	1–0	3–0	2–1	0–0	—	4–1	0–5	0–2
Red Star	1–0	2–0	0–1	0–0	2–2	1–1	1–1	3–1	3–1	0–3	1–2	1–0	1–0	1–3	1–3	—	1–1	0–3
Rodez	1–2	1–1	5–1	0–2	2–2	1–1	5–1	2–1	1–2	1–3	3–3	1–0	1–3	1–1	1–0	0–2	—	2–1
Troyes	0–0	1–0	0–1	2–0	3–0	0–1	1–0	0–0	0–1	0–2	0–1	4–0	2–1	0–3	3–0	2–2	0–3	—

Source: Ligue 2
Legend: Blue = home team win; Yellow = draw; Red = away team win.

== Promotion play-offs ==
A promotion play-off competition is held at the end of the season, involving the 3rd, 4th and 5th-placed teams in 2024–25 Ligue 2, and the 16th-placed team in 2024–25 Ligue 1.

The quarter-final was played on 14 May, and the semi-final on 17 May.

Quarter-final
4B	Dunkerque	1
5B	Guingamp	0

Semi-final
3B	Metz	1
4B	Dunkerque	0

Final
3B	Metz	1	3	4
16A	Reims	1	1	2

Quarter-final

14 May 2025
20:30 CEST (UTC+2)

Dunkerque	1–0	Guingamp
Rivera 46'	Report

Stade Marcel-Tribut, Dunkirk
Attendance: 4,933
Referee: Abdelatif Kherradji

Semi-final

17 May 2025
20:30 CEST (UTC+2)

Metz	1–0	Dunkerque
Bammou 90+3' (o.g.)	Report

Stade Saint-Symphorien, Longeville-lès-Metz
Referee: Mathieu Vernice

Promotion Play-off Final
1st leg

21 May 2025
20:00 CEST (UTC+2)

Metz	1–1	Reims
Udol 38'	Report	Kipré 52'

Stade Saint-Symphorien, Longeville-lès-Metz
Attendance: 27,767
Referee: Hakim Ben El Hadj

2nd leg

29 May 2025
20:30 CEST (UTC+2)

Reims	1–3 (a.e.t.)	Metz
Tia 57'	Report	Udol 78'; Touré 110'; Hein 114'

Stade Auguste-Delaune, Reims
Referee: Eric Wattellier

Metz won 4–2 on aggregate and were promoted to Ligue 1, while Reims were relegated to Ligue 2.

== Relegation play-offs ==
20 May 2025
20:45 CEST (UTC+2)

Boulogne	1–3	Clermont Foot
Epailly 23'	Report	Diop 31'; Koré 79'; Diédhiou 85'

Stade de la Libération, Boulogne-sur-Mer
Attendance: 5,813
Referee: Guillaume Paradis
25 May 2025
17:00 CEST (UTC+2)

Clermont Foot	1–2	Boulogne
Diédhiou 73'	Report	Averlant 55'; Vercruysse 70'

Stade Gabriel-Montpied, Clermont-Ferrand
Attendance: 9,096

Clermont Foot won 4–3 on aggregate and remained in Ligue 2. Boulogne were promoted after Ajaccio were administratively relegated.

== Attendances ==
#	Football club	Average attendance
1	FC Metz	19,361
2	Stade Malherbe Caen	15,237
3	FC Lorient	12,083
4	Paris FC	10,277
5	SC Bastia	9,499
6	EA Guingamp	8,821
7	Amiens SC	6,857
8	Stade Lavallois	6,378
9	FC Annecy	6,244
10	ESTAC	5,967
11	Clermont Foot 63	5,088
12	Grenoble Foot 38	4,815
13	Rodez AF	4,392
14	Red Star FC	4,370
15	USL Dunkerque	4,180
16	AC Ajaccio	3,181
17	Pau FC	3,070
18	FC Martigues	1,471
