= André Rey =

André Rey may refer to:

- André Rey (footballer) (born 1948), French former professional football goalkeeper
- André Rey (psychologist) (1906–1965), Swiss psychologist
