= Charles Fosset =

French footballer and manager

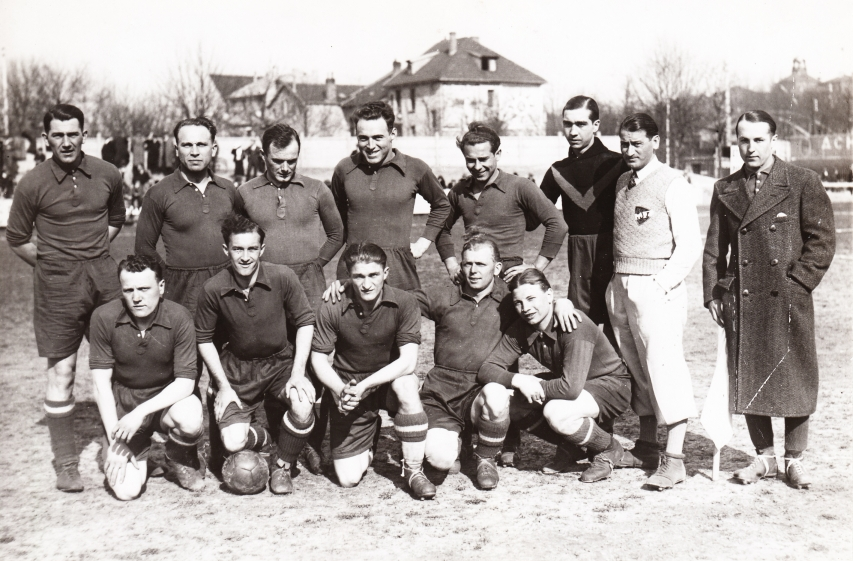
- Fosset (seated, first from left) in March 1933

Personal information
- Date of birth: 25 February 1910
- Place of birth: Montigny-lès-Metz, Moselle, France
- Date of death: 12 December 1989 (aged 79)
- Place of death: Jarny, Meurthe-et-Moselle, France
- Height: 1.85 m (6 ft 1 in)
- Position: Central midfielder

Senior career*
| Years | Team | Apps | (Gls) |
| 1932–1939 | Cercle Athlétique Messin | | |
| 1932–1939 | FC Metz | 162 | (23) |
| 1940–1941 | Fußball Verein Metz | | |

International career
| 1937 | France | 2 | (0) |

Managerial career
- 1944–1945: FC Metz
- 1947–1949: FC Metz
- * Club domestic league appearances and goals

Charles Fosset (25 February 1910 – 12 December 1989), nicknamed Lolo, was a French footballer who played as a central midfielder for FC Metz and the French national team in the 1930s. After retiring, he served as the manager of Metz twice in the 1940s.

== Early life ==
Charles Fosset was born on 25 February 1910 in Montigny-lès-Metz, in the Lorraine region, a short distance from the capital Metz, which at the time, belonged to the German Empire, thus being called Karl at birth. Due to his status as a Frenchman born in a territory from the German Empire, Fosset, like many other players born in Lorraine, was the victim of ostracism by part of French society throughout his life.

== Playing career ==
=== Club career ===
Fosset began his football career at Cercle Athlétique Messin, which would merge with ASM to form FC Metz in 1932, which then obtained professional status and participated in the first French top division championship. However, like many of his teammates, he was not a pure professional footballer, having a second job as a mechanic at the Metz-Frescaty military airfield.

On 11 September 1932, the 22-year-old Fosset was one of the eleven footballers who played in Metz's debut in the inaugural season of the new league, which ended in a 1–2 loss to Stade Rennes. Thanks to his athletic style and remarkable heading, he quickly established himself as an essential center-half, so he did not miss a match during the rest of the season, and since substitutions were not yet possible at that time, he also did not miss a single minute of play. As second-to-last in the table, they were relegated to Ligue 2 in 1933, and although he scored eleven goals during the 1933–34 season, he and his team failed to gain promotion. However, they did manage to do so in 1935, when the club, briefly renamed CS Metz (1934–1936), won the second division title.

Together with Albert Rohrbacher, Marcel Marchal, and Charles Zehren, Fosset played a crucial role in helping Metz become a stable team in the top division, and then reaching the national cup final in 1938, which ended in a 1–2 loss to league runners-up Olympique Marseille, but not without controversy. In the 118th minute, Fosset, in a fierce and desperate surge, made a goal-line clearance on a header from Olympique striker Emmanuel Aznar; it could not be determined with certainty whether the ball had already crossed the line, but after a long hesitation, the referee awarded the goal, sparking fierce protests from Metz and the crowd. In total, he scored 31 goals in 197 official matches, including 9 goals in 113 top division matches, 14 in 49 second division matches, and 8 goals in 35 Coupe de France matches.

The outbreak of the Second World War caused the cessation of regular play, so Metz reduced its activities to playing only a few friendlies, and when Fosset's home region was incorporated into Germany, Metz lost its professional status, being renamed Fußball Verein Metz and joining the German league. After an exile in Istres, Fosset returned to football in August 1940, playing three seasons in a Saar-Palatinate championship, the Gauliga Südwest/Mainhessen, an antechamber of the Bundesliga. In 1941, Fosset played three matches for Metz in the DFB-Pokal. The club finished 2nd in the league for 3 years in a row.

During the War, he lost a child and his wife, and was wounded in the head by a shell fragment at the Battle of Mey in 1944.

=== International career ===
On 31 October 1937, the 27-year-old Fosset earned his first international cap in a friendly match against the Netherlands in Amsterdam, helping his side to a 3–2 win. On 5 December 1937, in his second and last appearance for France, he played a crucial role in holding the reigning World Champions Italy to a 0–0 draw, as he muzzled their center forward Silvio Piola, a great specialist in the position.

Fosset was then excluded from the French national team due to the hatred that many French still felt towards those who had been born in an area that at the time belonged to the German Empire; for instance, in 1937, the press headlined "Two Boches in the French team", as a reference to Fosset and another player from Lorraine. A similar incident had occurred a year earlier, in 1936, when during a trip to Marseille, the injured Fosset attended the match in the stands alongside its president, Raymond Herlory, and were "shocked" to hear OM supporters jeering at their team: "Bunch of Germans, go home".

== Managerial career ==
After the liberation of the city by the Allies, the club structures in Metz were rebuilt and Fosset served as its coach in the 1944–45 season, to only be paid after the first revenues had been collected; however, he was replaced shortly after by the Dutchman Beb Bakhuys.

In the build-up to the 1947–48 season, Fosset was given this position again amidst a relegation battle, and despite many difficulties, including the death of striker Gustave Kemp in a road accident, he managed to ensure Metz's permanence in the first division on two occasions, the latter of which by a very narrow margin, which was also his last season as coach. Between 1947 and 1949, he led the team in 68 top division matches, ending with a record of 23 wins, 10 draws, and 35 losses.

== Later life and death ==
In 1958, Fosset founded the Cercle Jeanne-d'Arc, an amateur club in his hometown of Montigny, but he was not the president. Fosset spent his entire life in Montigny-les-Metz where his experience benefited many footballers.

Fosset died in Jarny on 12 December 1989, at the age of 79.

== Honours ==
FC Metz

- Ligue 2
  - Champions (1): 1934–35
- Coupe de France
  - Runner-up (1): 1938
