= Joseph Mangondo =

French footballer (born 2005)

Personal information
- Full name: Lima Joseph Mangondo
- Date of birth: 6 August 2005 (age 21)
- Place of birth: Villeneuve-Saint-Georges, France
- Height: 1.85 m (6 ft 1 in)
- Position: Striker

Team information
- Current team: Metz
- Number: 17

Youth career
- Fleury
- –2022: Boulogne-Billancourt
- 2022–2024: Metz

Senior career*
Years	Team	Apps	(Gls)
2023–	Metz B	36	(12)
2024–	Metz	4	(0)
- * Club domestic league appearances and goals as of 20:55, 27 July 2025 (UTC)

Lima Joseph Mangondo (born 6 August 2005) is a French professional footballer who plays as a striker for Ligue 2 club Metz.

== Career ==
After coming through the ranks of Fleury and Boulogne-Billancourt, Mangondo joined the youth academy of Metz in July 2022, at the age of 16. On 30 July 2024, while a reserve player, he extended his contract with the club. On 16 November 2024, he made his professional debut for Metz in a 3–0 Coupe de France win over Obernai. His Ligue 2 debut came on 9 December 2024, when he came on as a substitute in a 0–0 draw against Dunkerque. On 11 February 2025, Mangondo signed his first professional contract with Metz, a deal until 2028.

== Personal life ==
Born in France, Mangondo is of Cameroonian descent.
