= Marcel Muller (footballer) =

French footballer (1916-1993)

Personal information
- Date of birth: 26 March 1916
- Place of birth: France
- Date of death: 8 June 1993 (aged 77)
- Place of death: France
- Position: Striker

Senior career*
Years	Team	Apps	(Gls)
1934–1939	Metz	75	(28)
- SO Merlebach
- US Forbach
- * Club domestic league appearances and goals

Marcel Muller (26 March 1916 – 8 June 1993) was a French footballer who was last known to have played as a striker for US Forbach.

== Career ==
Muller played for French Ligue 1 side Metz for five season, making seventy-five league appearances and scoring twenty-eight goals, helping the club reach the 1938 Coupe de France final.
