= Jardin botanique de Metz =

Botanical garden in Grand Est, France

Coordinates: 49°06′16″N 6°09′39″E

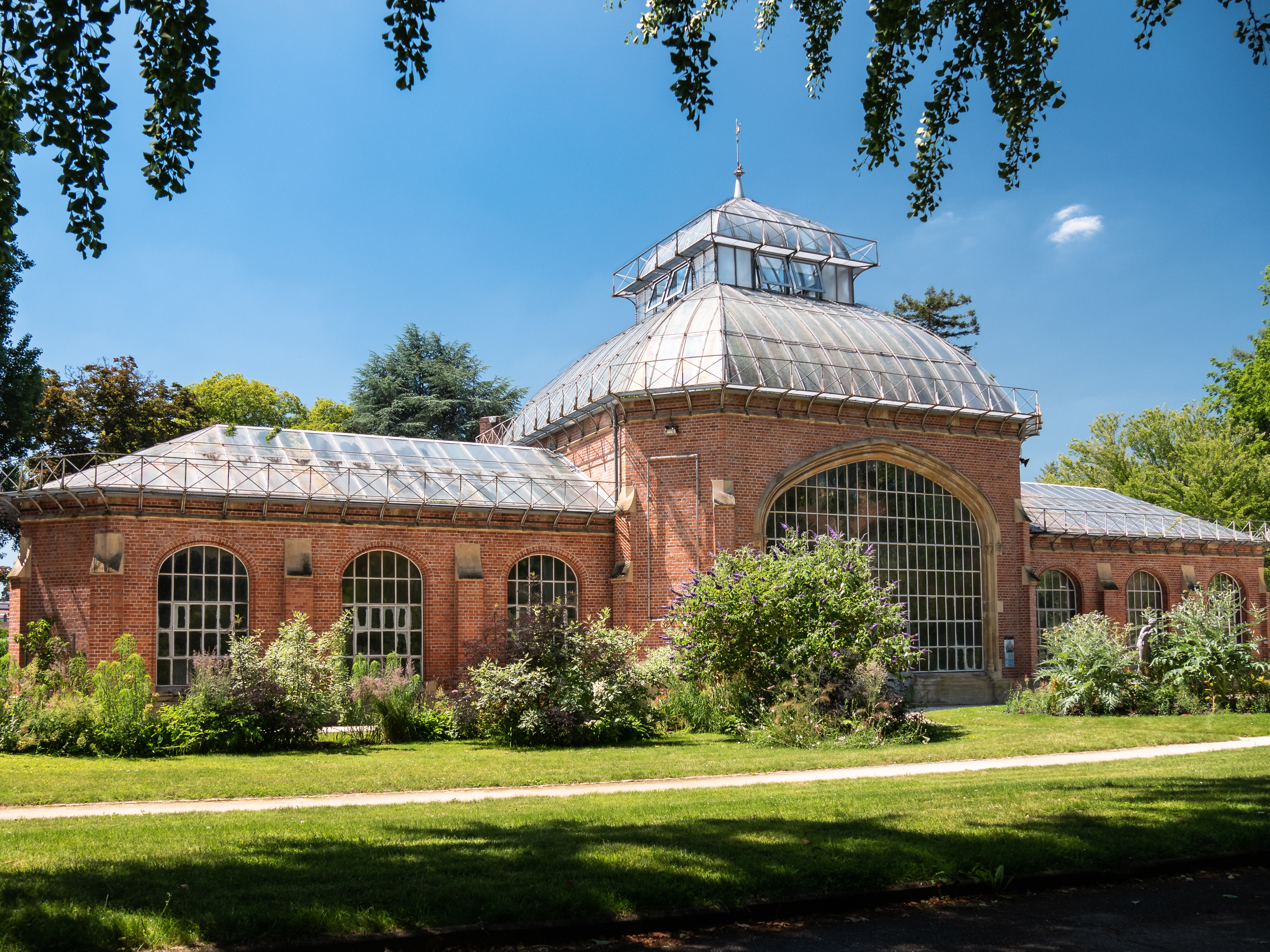
Greenhouse at the Jardin botanique

The Jardin botanique de Metz, also known as the Jardin botanique de la Ville de Metz, is a 4.4-hectare (11-acre) botanical garden located at 27 ter, rue du Pont-à-Mousson, Montigny-lès-Metz, Moselle, Grand Est, France. It is open daily; admission is free.

The garden was originally known as Frescatelly Park, an estate of Philippe d'Aubertin of Bionville, whose summer pavilion (built 1719) currently houses the directorate of the Department of Parks. It was purchased by the city of Metz in 1866 and landscaped primarily in the English style by city architect Demoget. Its greenhouses were originally built on the city's esplanade in 1861, during the World Fair, and moved to the Botanical Garden in 1880.

Today the garden contains a rose garden (80 varieties), fragrance garden, collection of grasses, flower beds, and a mature arboretum with Aesculus flava, bald cypress, Diospyros virginiana, Fagus sylvatica asplenifolia, ginkgo, Melia azedarach, sequoia (140 years old), and Sophora japonica, as well as a large stand of hardy bamboo (Phyllostachys aurea). Its 1,000 m^{2} (11,000 sq ft) greenhouses contain about 4,500 plants representing 80 botanical families, including orchids, cacti, and palms.

The garden contains three ponds, winding paths, a bronze statue of an eagle (1866) by Metz animalier Christopher Fratin, and a toy train railway that circles through the site.

== See also ==
- List of botanical gardens in France
