= Cléo Mélières =

French footballer (born 2005)

Personal information
- Date of birth: 14 August 2005 (age 21)
- Place of birth: Besançon, France
- Height: 1.75 m (5 ft 9 in)
- Position: Right-back

Team information
- Current team: Bastia (on loan from Metz)
- Number: 13

Youth career
- Racing Besançon
- 2018–2022: Sochaux
- 2022–2023: Racing Besançon

Senior career*
Years	Team	Apps	(Gls)
2023	Racing Besançon	23	(5)
2023–	Metz II	46	(6)
2025–	Metz	2	(0)
2026–	→ Bastia (loan)	4	(0)
- * Club domestic league appearances and goals as of 5 September 2026

Cléo Mélières (born 14 August 2005) is a French professional football player who plays as a right-back for Ligue 3 club Bastia on loan from Metz.

== Club career ==
Mélières is a product of the youth academies of the French clubs Racing Besançon followed by Sochaux. He returned to Racing Besançon in 2022, and in 2023 debuted with them in the Championnat National 2. On 26 May 2023, he moved to Metz where he joined their reserves in the Championnat National 3. On 11 June 2025, he signed his first professional contract with Metz until 2026. He made his senior and professional debut with Metz in a 6–1 loss to Lille on 26 October 2025.

== Personal life ==
Mélières's younger brother Timothé Mélières plays for Metz's youth academy.

== Career statistics ==
As of match played 9 November 2025

Appearances and goals by club, season and competition
Club	Season	League			Cup		Other		Total	
Club	Season	Division	Apps	Goals	Apps	Goals	Apps	Goals	Apps	Goals
Racing Besançon	2022–23	CFA 2	23	5	—		—		23	5
Metz II	2023–24	National 3	12	0	—		—		12	0
Metz II	2024–25	National 3	25	5	—		—		25	5
Metz II	2025–26	National 3	1	0	—		—		1	0
Metz II	Total		38	5	—		—		38	5
Metz	2025–26	Ligue 1	2	0	0	0	0	0	2	0
Career total			63	10	0	0	0	0	63	10
