= Sébastien Bichard =

French football manager (born 1983)

Personal information
- Date of birth: 29 May 1983 (age 43)
- Place of birth: Le Blanc, France
- Height: 1.75 m (5 ft 9 in)
- Position: Midfielder

Team information
- Current team: Marseille (assistant)

Youth career
- Châteauroux

Senior career*
| Years | Team | Apps | (Gls) |
- Payerne
- Bulle
- Nyon
- Meyrin

Managerial career
- 2014–2016: Nyon
- 2019: Sion (joint caretaker)
- 2019: Sion (joint caretaker)
- 2020: Kosovo (caretaker)
- 2024: Clermont
- * Club domestic league appearances and goals

Sébastien Bichard (born 29 May 1983) is a French football manager and former player. He is the currently assistant coach at Ligue 1 club Marseille. He also holds Swiss nationality.

== Playing career ==
Born in Le Blanc in the department of Indre, Bichard was raised in Saint-Benoît-du-Sault and attended the French Football Federation's centre in Tours before joining the academy of LB Châteauroux.

Aged 19, Bichard moved to Switzerland to join Stade Payerne in the fifth division. He remained in the Alpine country for the rest of his playing career with FC Bulle, FC Stade Nyonnais and FC Meyrin; he played in the second-tier Swiss Challenge League with Nyon.

== Managerial career ==
=== Sion ===
Bichard began his managerial career in 2011 with the under-14 team of Vaud Nyon, and was Stade Nyonnais's head coach from 2014 to 2016. For the next two years, he was under-18 manager at FC Lausanne-Sport. He was then under-21 manager of FC Sion's under-21 team, winning the reserve league. He had two spells in joint caretaker management of Sion's first team in 2019, alongside Christian Zermatten.

=== Kosovo ===
In November 2020, Bichard was included as an assistant to Swiss manager Bernard Challandes for the Kosovo national football team. As the manager was ill with COVID-19, Bichard led the team in UEFA Nations League games against Slovenia and Moldova, winning the latter 1–0 and keeping the team in Group C.

While still assistant manager for Kosovo, Bichard took up the same position at Sion in December 2022 under Fabio Celestini.

=== Clermont ===
In the summer of 2023, Bichard was close to being hired by French Championnat National side FC Versailles 78, before being named assistant to Habib Beye at Red Star F.C. in the same league. The following March he left for another number-two job at Clermont Foot, who were battling relegation from Ligue 1.

Clermont were relegated to Ligue 2, Pascal Gastien left, and Bichard led the team for the 2024–25 season. On his debut on 16 August, he drew 2–2 at home to Pau FC. He left by mutual agreement on 28 October with the team in 14th, having won twice and lost five times in ten games.

On 1 February 2025, Bichard was named as one of assistant managers at Stade Rennais FC in Ligue 1, again working for Beye.
