= Max Schirschin =

German footballer and manager

Personal information
- Full name: Max Schirschin
- Date of birth: 29 January 1921
- Place of birth: Kranowitz, Germany
- Date of death: 16 May 2013 (aged 92)
- Position: Defender

Senior career*
Years	Team	Apps	(Gls)
–1947	Schalke 04		
1947–1948	Angers		
1948–1950	Le Havre	44	(0)
1950–1955	Rouen	166	(1)
1955–1958	RC Maison-Carrée		
1958–1961	Rouen	12	(0)

Managerial career
- 1958–1963: Rouen
- 1964–1965: Gent
- 1965–1966: Fortuna '54
- 1966–1968: Metz
- 1968–1971: Le Havre
- * Club domestic league appearances and goals

Max Schirschin (29 January 1921 – 16 May 2013) was a German football player and manager.

He played for Schalke 04, Angers, Le Havre, Rouen and RC Maison-Carrée.

He coached Rouen, Gent, Fortuna '54, Metz and Le Havre. and Bastia.
