= 1938 Coupe de France final =

- Event: 1937–38 Coupe de France
Marseille	Metz
2	1
- After extra time
- Date: 8 May 1938
- Venue: Parc des Princes, Paris
- Referee: Charles Munsch
- Attendance: 33,044

The 1938 Coupe de France final was a football match held at Parc des Princes, Paris on May 8, 1938, that saw Olympique de Marseille defeat FC Metz 2–1 thanks to goals by Vilmos Kohut and Emmanuel Aznar.

== Match details ==
8 May 1938

Marseille	2–1 (a.e.t.)	Metz
Kohut 49'; Aznar 118'		Rohrbacher 84'

Parc des Princes, Paris
Attendance: 33,044
Referee: Charles Munsch

GK	(Brazil) Bezerra de Vasconcellos
DF	(France) Abdelkader Ben Bouali
DF	(France) Henri Conchy
DF	(France) Jean Bastien
DF	(Switzerland) Ferdinand Bruhin (c)
MF	(France) Joseph Gonzales
MF	(France) Emile Zermani
FW	(France) (Poland) Franz Olejniczak
FW	(France) Mario Zatelli
FW	(France) Emmanuel Aznar
FW	(Hungary) Vilmos Kohut
Manager:
(France) Henri Conchy Assistant Referees: Mr. Conrié, Mr. Capdeville; Fourth Official:

GK	(France) Charles Kappé
DF	(France) Henri Nock
DF	(France) Charles Zehren
DF	(France) Nicolas Hibst (c)
DF	(France) Charles Fosset
MF	(France) Marcel Marchal
MF	(France) Jean Lauer
FW	(France) Ignace Kowalczyk
FW	(France) Marcel Muller
FW	(Czechoslovakia) Karel Hess
FW	(France) Albert Rohrbacher
Manager:
(England) Ted Magner

== See also ==
- 1937–38 Coupe de France
