= Nicolas Hibst =

French footballer and manager (1915-1959)

Personal information
- Full name: Nicolas Hibst
- Date of birth: 12 October 1915
- Place of birth: Tucquegnieux, France
- Date of death: 21 January 1959 (aged 43)
- Place of death: Saint-Avold, France
- Position: Midfielder

Senior career*
Years	Team	Apps	(Gls)
1933–1940	Metz	130	(3)
1940–1945	Saint-Étienne	16	(1)
1945–1946	Metz	5	(0)

Managerial career
- 1946–1947: Metz
- 1947–1950: Lens
- 1950–1953: Niort
- * Club domestic league appearances and goals

Nicolas Hibst (12 October 1915 – 21 January 1959) was a French association football player and manager. During his career, he played in Division 1 and Division 2 with FC Metz and AS Saint-Étienne and was part of the Metz side which lost the 1938 Coupe de France final.

His first foray into coaching came when he took charge of Division 1 side Metz in 1946. After just one season, he left to manage Lens where he guided the Division 2 outfit to the 1948 Coupe de France final and to the Division 2 championship the following season. His career finished when he left Division 3 club Chamois Niortais in 1953, after a three-year tenure. Hibst died in Saint-Avold in January 1959 at the age of 43.
