= André Rey (footballer) =

French footballer (born 1948)

Personal information
- Date of birth: 22 January 1948 (age 78)
- Place of birth: Strasbourg, France
- Height: 1.87 m (6 ft 2 in)
- Position: Goalkeeper

Youth career
- FC Rosheim

Senior career*
Years	Team	Apps	(Gls)
1968–1974	Strasbourg	17	(0)
1971–1972	→ Mulhouse (loan)	30	(0)
1974–1980	Metz	198	(1)
1980–1982	Nice	59	(0)
1982–1983	Mulhouse	31	(0)
1983–1984	La Roche	13	(0)
Total		348	(1)

International career
1977–1979	France	10	(0)
- * Club domestic league appearances and goals

André Rey (born 22 January 1948) is a French former professional footballer who played as a goalkeeper.
