= Mathieu Chabert =

French footballer (born 1978)

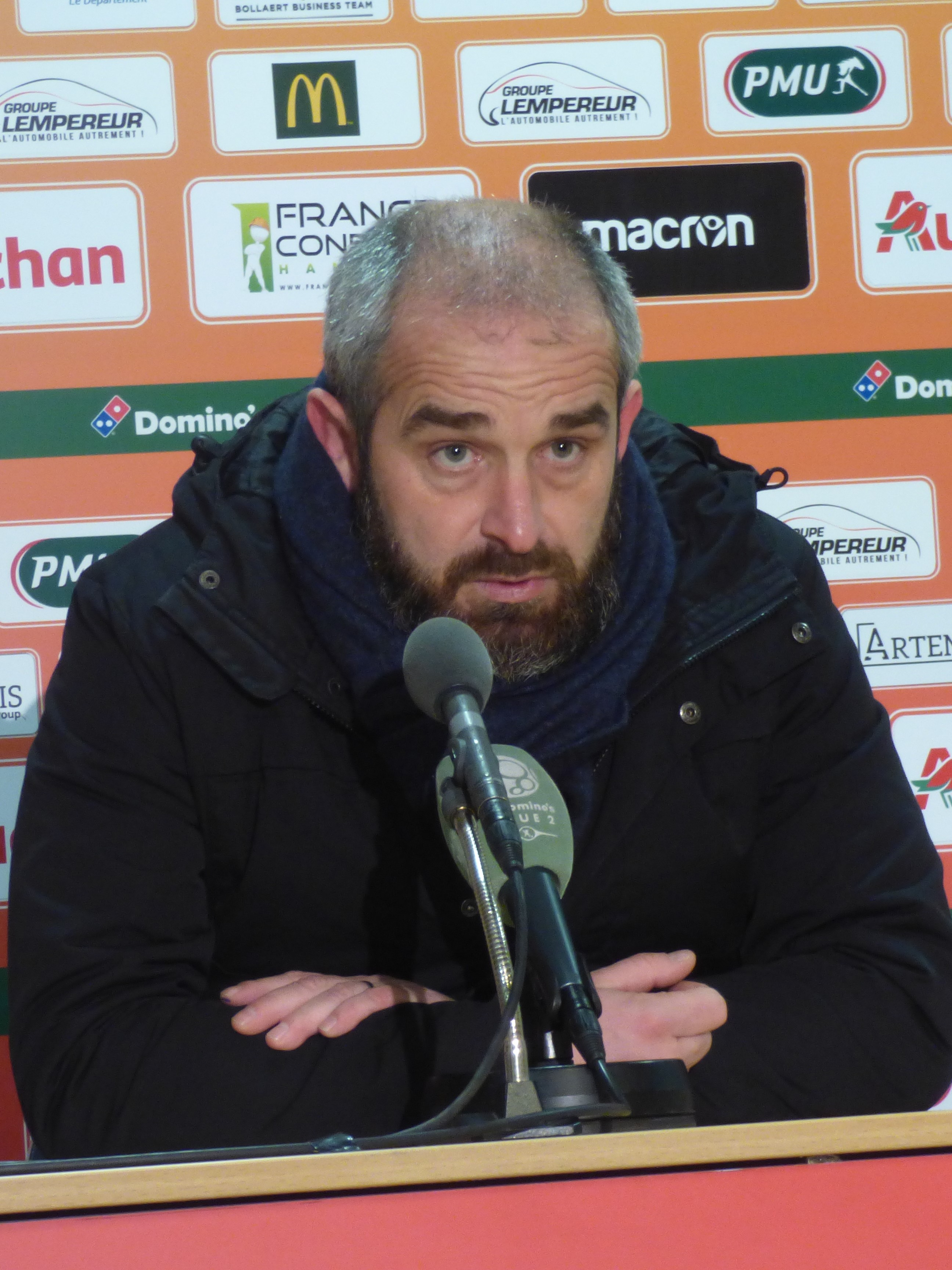
- Chabert in 2019

Personal information
- Date of birth: 5 December 1978 (age 47)
- Place of birth: Béziers, France
- Height: 1.81 m (5 ft 11 in)
- Position: Goalkeeper

Team information
- Current team: Cannes (manager)

Youth career
- 1992–1997: Saint-Étienne

Senior career*
Years	Team	Apps	(Gls)
1997	Udinese		
1997	Ayr United		
1997–1998	Rouen		
1998–2003	Béziers		

Managerial career
- 2003–2004: Béziers (assistant)
- 2004–2005: Béziers Cheminots
- 2005–2006: Saint-Chinian
- 2006–2007: Sète
- 2008–2009: PCAC Sète
- 2009–2011: Sète
- 2011–2013: Béziers B
- 2013–2019: Béziers
- 2019–2021: Bastia
- 2021–2022: Châteauroux
- 2023: Dunkerque
- 2024: Le Mans
- 2024–2025: Ajaccio
- 2025–: Cannes
- * Club domestic league appearances and goals

Mathieu Chabert (born 5 December 1978) is a French football manager and a former player who played as a goalkeeper. He is the manager of Ligue 3 club Cannes.

== Playing career ==
Chabert was a goalkeeper and was part of Saint-Étienne's youth academy, and briefly joined Udinese in Italy, and Ayr United in Scotland before spending the rest of his playing career in the lower leagues of France.

== Managerial career ==
Chabert joined Béziers in 2011 as an assistant and became the senior coach in 2013. Chabert helped promote AS Béziers into the French Ligue 2 for the first time in their history in 2018.

In late October 2019 Chabert left Béziers to manage SC Bastia, dropping a league in what was reported as a surprise move. He led Bastia to promotion to Ligue 2 in the 2020–21 season. On 22 September 2021, he was dismissed by Bastia after gaining 7 points in the first 9 games of the Ligue 2 season.

On 14 October 2021, he was hired by Châteauroux, returning to Championnat National. More than a year later he was sacked on 29 November.

On 2 March 2023, he succeeded Romain Revelli as manager of Dunkerque in the Championnat National. He managed to get the club promoted to Ligue 2, but on 24 September 2023, he was sacked with the club in 17th position.

On 27 October 2025, Chabert was hired by Cannes in the fourth tier. After he led the club to promotion to Ligue 3 at the end of the 2025–26 season, his contract was extended for two more seasons.
