= Benoît Tavenot =

French football manager (born 1977)

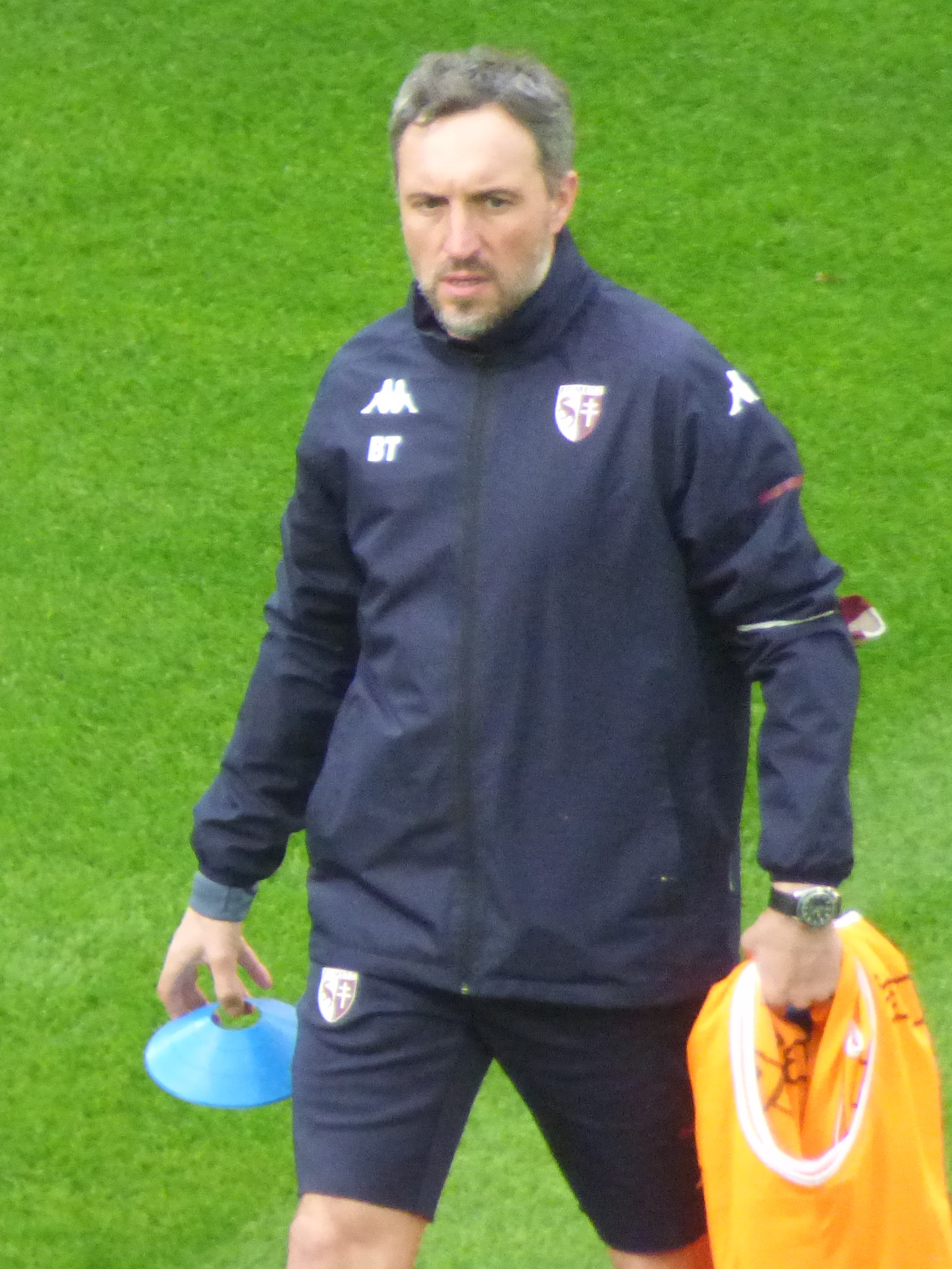
- Tavenot as assistant manager of Metz in 2021

Personal information
- Date of birth: 3 January 1977 (age 49)
- Place of birth: Paris, France
- Height: 1.83 m (6 ft 0 in)
- Position: Midfielder

Youth career
- AS Kilstett

Senior career*
Years	Team	Apps	(Gls)
1996–1998	AS Strasbourg		
1998–1999	ASPV Strasbourg		
1999–2003	CA Bastia		
2003–2004	SC Bastia B		

Managerial career
- 2018: Bastia-Borgo
- 2023–2024: Dijon
- 2024–2025: SC Bastia
- 2026: Metz
- * Club domestic league appearances and goals

Benoît Tavenot (born 3 January 1977) is a French football manager and former player.

== Playing career ==
Born in Paris, Tavenot was raised in Strasbourg in Alsace. A midfielder, he began playing in his adopted region for AS Kilstett, AS Strasbourg and AS Pierrots Vauban Strasbourg.

== Coaching career ==
=== Early career ===
Tavenot worked in several posts within SC Bastia including as assistant manager and reserve team manager. In February 2018 he was named manager at Championnat National 2 (fourth-tier) club FC Bastia-Borgo, the successor to his former club CA Bastia.

After one year as assistant manager of Cercle Brugge in the Belgian Pro League, Tavenot was named as part of the staff of Vincent Hognon at Metz in June 2019. He retained his post under succeeding manager Frédéric Antonetti but left the club as did the latter following relegation to Ligue 2 in 2022; Tavenot's contract was set to last to 2024.

In February 2023, Tavenot returned to the city where he grew up, joining RC Strasbourg Alsace again as Antonetti's assistant. Possessing the Brevet d'entraîneur professionnel de football to coach football in France to the highest level, he left this post in June.

=== Dijon ===
Tavenot became head coach of Dijon in the third-tier Championnat National on a two-year deal in June 2023. Having come fourth in his only season, he left by mutual consent while strongly linked to a return to SC Bastia as head coach.

=== Bastia ===
Tavenot joined SC Bastia of Ligue 2 on a two-year deal in June 2024, with his former mentor Antonetti being the director of football. On his debut as manager in a professional division on 19 August, his team drew 1–1 at Metz. The 2024–25 season ended with the Corsican club in 8th place, having used a young and inexperienced squad. On 30 October 2025, with the club in last place after taking four points from eleven winless games, he was dismissed.

=== Metz ===
On 20 January 2026, Tavenot returned to Metz, succeeding Stéphane Le Mignan at Ligue 1's bottom club. Five days later he made his debut as a top-flight manager in a 5–2 home loss to Lyon. After failing to get a single win in 16 games, and getting relegated from Ligue 1, Metz announced that Tavenot would leave at the end of the season, following the end of his contract.
