= FC Metz =

Association football club in France

Metz
- Full name: Football Club de Metz
- Nicknames: Les Grenats (The Maroons), Les Graoullys
- Founded: 20 February 1919; 107 years ago
- Stadium: Stade Saint-Symphorien
- Capacity: 28,786
- Owner: Bernard Serin
- President: Bernard Serin
- Head coach: Grégory Proment
- League: Ligue 2
- 2025–26: Ligue 1, 18th of 18 (relegated)
- Website: fcmetz.com
Home colours	Away colours	Third colours

Football Club de Metz (French pronunciation: [mɛs]) is a French association football club based in Metz, Lorraine. Founded in 1919, the club competes in the Ligue 2, following relegation from the Ligue 1 in the 2025-26 season. They play their home matches at Stade Saint-Symphorien located within the city. Despite never winning the top flight, they have won the Coupe de France twice and the Coupe de la Ligue twice.

== History ==
Metz was founded on 23 March 1932 by the amalgamation of two amateur athletic clubs, and shortly thereafter became a professional team; it is one of the oldest professional football teams in France. Its roots trace back further, to the SpVgg Metz club, formed in 1905 when the city of Metz was part of the German Empire. SpVgg played in the tier-one Westkreis-Liga for a season in 1913–14, before the outbreak of the First World War stopped all play. Some players of this club were part of the Cercle Athlétique Messin in 1919, which went on to become FC Metz in 1932. Messin was a leading club in the Division d'Honneur – Lorraine, taking out league titles in 1920, 1921, 1922, 1924, 1926, 1927, 1929 and 1931.

The club played in the French second division north from 1933, winning the league in 1935 and earning promotion to Ligue 1 for the first time. The team became a mid-table side in the first division until the outbreak of the war interfered with play once more. FCM did not take part in the top-tier regional competitions in 1939–40.

During World War II, due to the Moselle département being annexed by Germany, the club had to play under the Germanised name of FV Metz in the Gauliga Westmark. In the three completed seasons of this league from 1941 to 1944, the club finished runners-up each year.

Despite the city of Metz being retaken by allied forces in autumn 1944, the club did not take part in French league football in 1944–45, but returned to Ligue 1 in 1945–46, to come 17th out of 18 clubs. An expansion of the league to 20 clubs meant, the team was not relegated and stayed at the highest level until 1950, when a last place finish ended its Ligue 1 membership. Metz was allowed to stay within Ligue 1 as a special privilege due to its catastrophic situation in the year following the war: the stadium had been damaged, almost beyond repair. The team had to start from scratch once again.

The club rebounded immediately, finishing second in Ligue 2, behind Lyon and returned to the first division. Metz made a strong return to this league, finishing fifth in its first season back. After this, the club once more had to battle against relegation season-by-season, finishing second-last in 1958 and having to return to Ligue 2. It took three seasons in this league before it could manage to return to Ligue 1 in 1961, but lasted for only one year in the top flight. Metz spent the next five seasons at second division level.

Metz ascended to the top level of French football once more in 1967; the team remained in the highest division until they were relegated in 2001, although they bounced back immediately and returned to the Ligue 1 the following year.

After losing the first leg of their 1984–85 European Cup Winners' Cup tie 4–2 to Barcelona at Stade Saint-Symphorien, Metz were widely expected to be thrashed at the Camp Nou. However, a hat-trick from Yugoslav striker Tony Kurbos gave Les Grenats a shock 4–1 win in the second leg to send the French side through 6–5 on aggregate.

In 1998, the team competed in the qualifications to the UEFA Champions League, but lost in the third round to Finnish team HJK Helsinki. In 2006, Metz were relegated from Ligue 1, finishing at the bottom of the table, despite the regular presence of an extremely promising prospect, Miralem Pjanić, who would later be transferred to giants Lyon, for an astonishing fee of €7.5 million. At the end of the 2011–12 season, Metz finished 18th in Ligue 2 and were relegated to the Championnat National, the third tier of French football after a 1–1 draw with Tours at home on 20 May 2012, in very tense circumstances. Metz spent only one season at this level, rebuilding a team with iconic former player Albert Cartier as coach, winning promotion to Ligue 2, and then immediately finishing first and winning promotion to Ligue 1. The team was relegated again to Ligue 2, but won promotion the next season. This time, Metz managed to secure a 14th place finish, ensuring another season in Ligue 1. For the 2017–18 Ligue 1 season, Metz endured a horrid campaign, losing eleven out of their first twelve matches. The club recovered later in the season but finished bottom of the table and were relegated back to Ligue 2.

On 26 April 2019, Metz were promoted back to Ligue 1 at the first time of asking by finishing first in Ligue 2. The promotion was confirmed with a 2–1 victory over Red Star. In the clubs first season back in the top flight, Metz finished 15th on the table followed by an improved 10th place finish the following season. In the 2021–22 Ligue 1 season, Metz finished 19th and were relegated back to Ligue 2. The club were promoted back to Ligue 1 as Ligue 2 runners-up for the 2022-23 season.

On Pentecost Sunday, May 29, 2023, there was a dispute at a youth football tournament on the field of SV Viktoria Preußen e.V. in the Eckenheim district of Frankfurt am Main between young players from Metz and JFC Berlin, in which a 16-year-old Moroccan player from Metz killed a 15-year-old German player from JFC Berlin.

On 12 June 2023, LFP Decision that Metz secure promotion to Ligue 1 from 2023–24 season after Bordeaux against Rodez has been suspended and return to top flight after one year absence. In the 2023–24 Ligue 1 season, Metz finished in the relegation/promotion playoff spot and faced off against Saint-Étienne from Ligue 2. Metz would lose the playoff 4-3 on aggregate and were relegated back to Ligue 2.

== Supporters and rivalries ==
Metz's biggest rivals are Nancy, with whom they contest the Lorraine derby. The other major rivals are Strasbourg.

There are currently two ultras groups: Gradins Populaires Ouest and Horda Frénétik (founded 1997).

Metz has fan friendships with Toulouse, the German clubs Kaiserslautern and Eintracht Trier and the Italian club Vicenza.

== Stadium ==
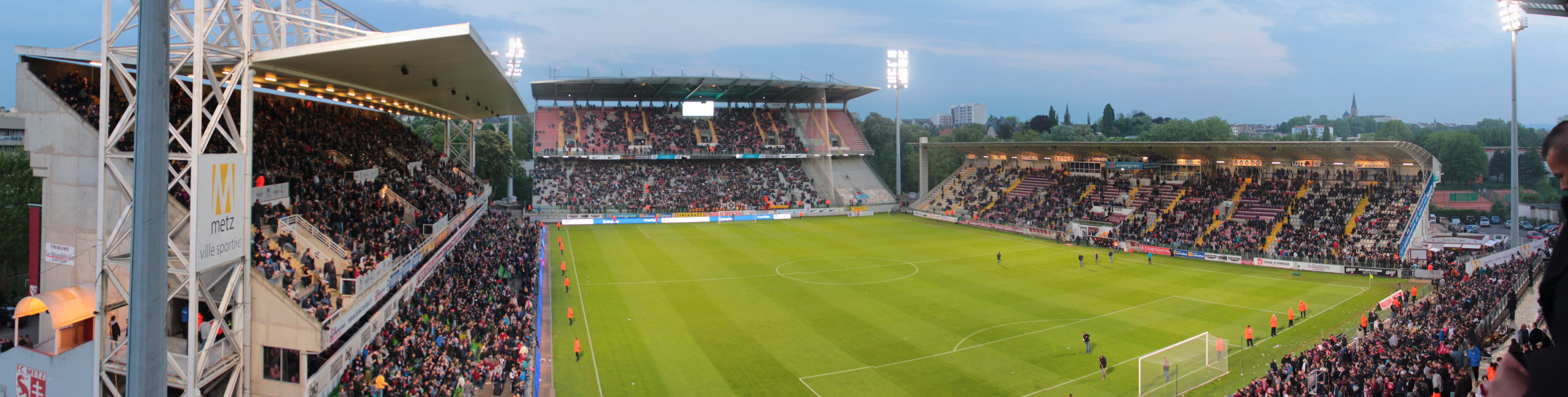
FC Metz home Stadium Stade Saint-Symphorien

Metz plays its home matches at Stade Saint-Symphorien, which has a capacity of 25,636. Thus, it is the largest venue dedicated to football in Lorraine.

== Crest ==
Its official colours are grenat (maroon) and white, from which the team derives its nickname Les Grenats. The team's crest features the Lorraine cross, symbolic of the team's regional affiliation, and the dragon called the Graoully, which in local legend was tamed by Saint Clement of Metz.

== Youth academy ==
Metz also gained recognition in France and Europe for its successful youth academy, which produced star players including: Rigobert Song, Robert Pires, Louis Saha, Emmanuel Adebayor, Papiss Cissé, Miralem Pjanić, Kalidou Koulibaly and Sadio Mané. The city's proximity to Luxembourg (about 55 km) plays a significant role in the importation of young prospects. The club's board has close ties with the Luxembourgish Football Federation. Nicolas "Nico" Braun, the team's top all-time goalscorer, as well as Pjanić or more recently Chris Philipps, have played in the G-D's amateur leagues before joining "les Grenats".

== Metz in European football ==
Season	Competition	Round	Club	Home	Away	Aggregate
1968–69	Inter-Cities Fairs Cup	First round	(Germany) Hamburger SV	1–4	2–3	3–7
1969–70	Inter-Cities Fairs Cup	First round	(Italy) Napoli	1–1	1–2	2–3
1984–85	UEFA Cup Winners' Cup	First round	(Spain) Barcelona	2–4	4–1	6–5
1984–85	UEFA Cup Winners' Cup	Second round	(East Germany) Dynamo Dresden	0–0	1–3	1–3
1985–86	UEFA Cup	First round	(Socialist Federal Republic of Yugoslavia) Hajduk Split	2–2	1–5	3–7
1988–89	UEFA Cup Winners' Cup	First round	(Belgium) Anderlecht	1–3	0–2	1–5
1995	UEFA Intertoto Cup	Group stage (Group 6)	(Iceland) Keflavík	—N/a	2–1	1st Place
1995	UEFA Intertoto Cup	Group stage (Group 6)	(Scotland) Partick Thistle	1–0	—N/a	1st Place
1995	UEFA Intertoto Cup	Group stage (Group 6)	(Croatia) NK Zagreb	—N/a	1–0	1st Place
1995	UEFA Intertoto Cup	Group stage (Group 6)	(Austria) Linzer ASK	1–0	—N/a	1st Place
1995	UEFA Intertoto Cup	Round of 16	(Romania) Ceahlăul	—N/a	2–0	2–0
1995	UEFA Intertoto Cup	Quarter-finals	(France) Strasbourg	0–2	—N/a	0–2
1996–97	UEFA Cup	First round	(Austria) Tirol Innsbruck	1–0	0–0	1–0
1996–97	UEFA Cup	Second round	(Portugal) Sporting CP	2–0	1–2	3–2
1996–97	UEFA Cup	Third round (round of 16)	(England) Newcastle United	1–1	0–2	1–3
1997–98	UEFA Cup	First round	(Belgium) R.E. Mouscron	4–1	2–0	6–1
1997–98	UEFA Cup	Second round	(Germany) Karlsruher SC	0–2	1–1	1–3
1998–99	UEFA Champions League	Second Qualifying round	(Finland) HJK	1–1	0–1	1–2
1998–99	UEFA Cup	First round	(Federal Republic of Yugoslavia) Red Star Belgrade	2–1	1–2	3–3(3–4 p)
1999	UEFA Intertoto Cup	Second round	(Slovakia) MŠK Žilina	3–0	1–2	4–2
1999	UEFA Intertoto Cup	Third round	(Belgium) Lokeren	0–1	2–1	2–2 (a)
1999	UEFA Intertoto Cup	Semi-finals	(Poland) Polonia Warsaw	5–1	1–1	6–2
1999	UEFA Intertoto Cup	Finals	(England) West Ham United	1–3	1–0	2–3

== Honours ==
Metz has never won the French championship; its best result was a second-place finish in 1998, behind Lens. The title race lasted until the ultimate fixture, however Metz never recovered from a 0–2 loss against Lens on their home turf. Metz won the Coupe de France twice, in 1984 and 1988, the first of these victories enabled it to qualify for the European Cup Winners' Cup where it achieved arguably the team's greatest moment, an upset of Barcelona in the first round of the competition in October 1984. It lost 4–2 at home in the first leg but won 4–1 away in the return leg, thus qualifying 6–5 on aggregate, making Metz unique among the French teams who have beaten Barcelona at the Camp Nou. Metz also won the Coupe de la Ligue twice, in 1986 and 1996, and has made a total of ten appearances in European tournaments.

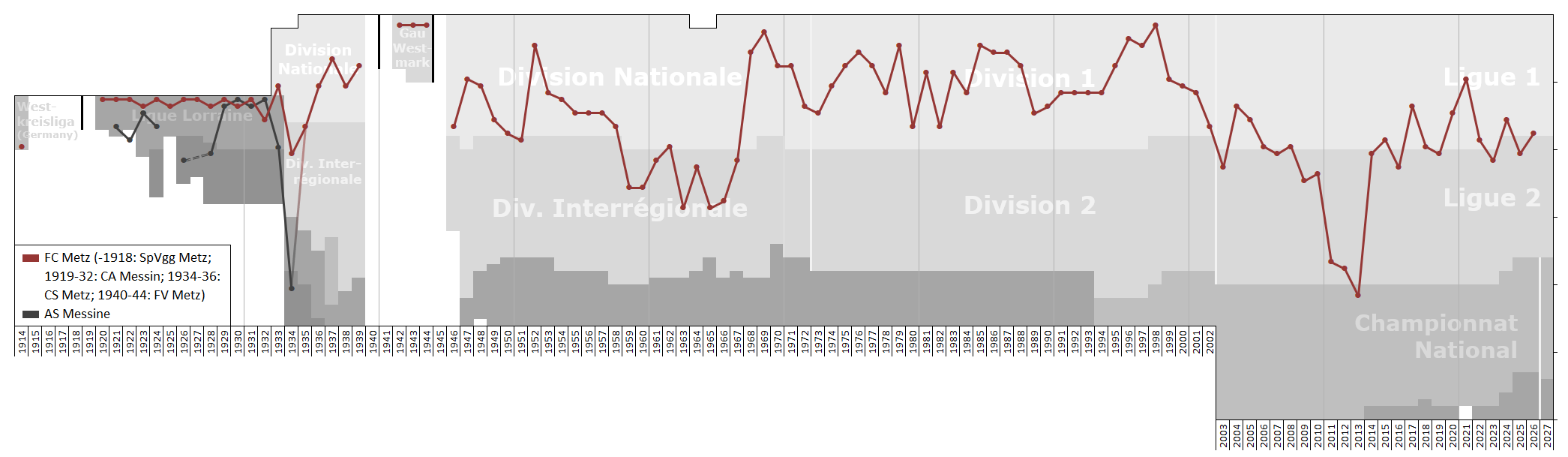
Historical league performance chart of FC Metz

- Ligue 1
  - Runners-up (1): 1997–98
- Ligue 2
  - Winners (4): 1934–35, 2006–07, 2013–14, 2018–19
  - Runners-up (4): 1950–51, 1960–61, 1966–67, 2022–23
- Coupe de France
  - Winners (2): 1983–84, 1987–88
  - Runners-up (1): 1937–38
- Coupe de la Ligue
  - Winners (2): 1985–86, 1995–96
  - Runners-up (1): 1998–99
- UEFA Intertoto Cup
  - Runners-up (1): 1999

== Players ==
=== Current squad ===
As of 25 September 2026

Note: Flags indicate national team as defined under FIFA eligibility rules; some limited exceptions apply. Players may hold more than one non-FIFA nationality.

No.	Pos.	Nation	Player
1	GK	DEN	Jonathan Fischer
2	DF	FRA	Maxime Colin
3	DF	FRA	Florian Miguel
4	DF	GAB	Urie-Michel Mboula
5	DF	FRA	Jean Ruiz
6	MF	SEN	Nampalys Mendy
7	FW	SEN	Ibou Sané
8	MF	FRA	Jessy Deminguet
9	FW	GEO	Giorgi Abuashvili (on loan from Kolkheti 1913)
10	MF	FRA	Téji Savanier
11	FW	SEN	Pape Moussa Fall
12	MF	SEN	Alpha Touré
16	GK	SEN	Vincent Gomis
17	FW	FRA	Joseph Mangondo
18	MF	FRA	Believe Munongo
19	FW	CMR	Morgan Bokele

No.	Pos.	Nation	Player
21	MF	FRA	Jahyann Pandore
22	FW	COD	Nathan Mbala
23	MF	LUX	Diego Duarte
26	DF	FRA	Abdoulaye Nassoko
27	MF	SEN	Alassane Sy
30	DF	FRA	Tahirys dos Santos
32	DF	FRA	Adam Marchal
33	FW	SEN	Abdourahmane Mbodj
38	FW	LUX	Hamza Kadamani
39	DF	CMR	Bryan Song
40	GK	SEN	Ousmane Ba
42	DF	COL	Cristian Devenish
61	GK	SEN	Pape Sy
70	DF	SEN	Bouna Sarr
77	FW	SEN	Abdoulaye Agne-Ba
98	DF	COM	Idris Mohamed

=== Out on loan ===
Note: Flags indicate national team as defined under FIFA eligibility rules; some limited exceptions apply. Players may hold more than one non-FIFA nationality.

No.	Pos.	Nation	Player
—	DF	TOG	Yannis Lawson (at Seraing until 30 June 2027)
—	DF	FRA	Cléo Mélières (at Bastia until 30 June 2027)

No.	Pos.	Nation	Player
—	FW	FRA	Édouard Soumah-Abbad (at Paris 13 Atletico until 30 June 2027)

=== Notable players ===
Below are the notable former players who have represented Metz in league and international competition since the club's foundation in 1932. To appear in the section below, a player must have played at least a full season for the club.

- (Togo) Emmanuel Adebayor
- (Peru) Wilmer Aguirre
- (Cameroon) Sébastien Bassong
- (France) Patrick Battiston
- (Scotland) Eric Black
- (France) Jocelyn Blanchard
- (Belgium) Danny Boffin
- (Luxembourg) Nico Braun
- (France) Albert Cartier
- (Senegal) Papiss Cissé
- (Argentina) Hugo Curioni
- (Togo) Mathieu Dossevi
- (France) Michel Ettore
- (France) Philippe Gaillot
- (Switzerland) Daniel Gygax
- (France) Philippe Hinschberger
- (Hungary) Szabolcs Huszti
- (Socialist Federal Republic of Yugoslavia) Božo Janković
- (South Korea) Ahn Jung-hwan
- (Poland) Henryk Kasperczak
- (France) Sylvain Kastendeuch
- (Japan) Eiji Kawashima
- (Senegal) Kalidou Koulibaly
- (France) Lionel Letizi
- (France) Florent Malouda
- (Senegal) Sadio Mané
- (France) Frédéric Meyrieu
- (Colombia) Faryd Mondragón
- (Colombia) Tressor Moreno
- (France) Marcel Muller
- (Poland) Ludovic Obraniak
- (United States) Oguchi Onyewu
- (Italy) Michele Padovano
- (France) Pascal Pierre
- (France) Robert Pires
- (Bosnia and Herzegovina) Miralem Pjanić
- (France) Grégory Proment
- (France) André Rey
- (France) Franck Ribéry
- (France) Jean-Philippe Rohr
- (France) Louis Saha
- (France) Franck Signorino
- (Cameroon) Rigobert Song
- (Cameroon) Jacques Songo'o
- (France) Luc Sonor
- (Luxembourg) Jeff Strasser
- (Poland) Marian Szeja
- (France) Sylvain Wiltord
- (France) Bernard Zénier
- (Georgia (country)) Georges Mikautadze

== Current technical staff ==
Position	Name
Head coach	Luc Holtz
Assistant coach	Hugues Prévost
Goalkeeping coach	Christophe Marichez
Physical trainer	Gauthier Netgen
Head doctors	Jules Gardenault; Claude Chandelle

=== Managerial history ===
- Willibald Stejskal (1932–33)
- Ted Maghner (1937–38)
- George Kimpton (1938)
- Paul Thomas (1938–39)
- Peter Fabian (1940–41)
- Charles Fosset (1944–45)
- Bep Bakhuys (1945–46)
- François Odry (1946)
- Ted Maghner (1946–47)
- Nicolas Hibst (1947)
- Charles Fosset (1947–49)
- Oscar Saggiero (1949–50)
- Ignace Kowalczyk (1950)
- Emile Veinante (1950–51)
- Elie Rous (1951–52)
- Emile Rummelhardt (1952–55)
- André Watrin (1955)
- Jacques Favre (1955–58)
- Marcel Tomazover (1958)
- Désiré Koranyi (1958–59)
- Robert Lacoste (1959)
- Jules Nagy (1959–63)
- Jacques Favre (1963–66)
- Max Schirschin (1966–67)
- Max Schirschin and René Fuchs (1967–68)
- Pierre Flamion (1968–70)
- René Fuchs (1970–71)
- Jacques Favre and Georges Zvunka (1971–72)
- René Vernier (1972–75)
- Georges Huart (1975–78)
- Marc Rastoll (1978–79)
- Marc Rastoll and Jean Snella (1979–80)
- Henryk Kasperczak (1980–84)
- Marcel Husson (1984–89)
- Henri Depireux (1989–Dec 89)
- Joël Muller (Dec 1989–Dec 2000)
- Albert Cartier (Dec 2000–Jan 2002)
- Francis De Taddeo (Jan 2002)
- Gilbert Gress (Jan 2002–02)
- Jean Fernandez (2002–05)
- Joël Muller (2005–06)
- Francis De Taddeo (2006–07)
- Yvon Pouliquen (2007–10)
- Joël Muller (2010)
- Dominique Bijotat (2010–12)
- Albert Cartier (2012–15)
- José Riga (2015)
- Philippe Hinschberger (2015–17)
- Frederic Hantz (2017–18)
- Frédéric Antonetti (2018–19)
- Vincent Hognon (2019–2020)
- Frédéric Antonetti (2020–2022)
- László Bölöni (2022–2024)
- Stéphane Le Mignan (2024–2026)
- Benoît Tavenot (2026)
- Luc Holtz (2026–)
