= 2025–26 Ligue 1 =

88th season of the Ligue 1

Ligue 1
- Season: 2025–26
- Dates: 15 August 2025 – 17 May 2026
- Champions: Paris Saint-Germain; 14th Ligue 1 title 14th French title
- Relegated: Nantes; Metz
- Champions League: Paris Saint-Germain; Lens; Lille; Lyon
- Europa League: Marseille; Rennes
- Conference League: Monaco
- Matches: 306
- Goals: 863 (2.82 per match)
- Top goalscorer: Esteban Lepaul (21 goals)
- Biggest home win: Strasbourg 5–0 Angers (5 October 2025); Lille 6–1 Metz (26 October 2025); Paris Saint-Germain 5–0 Rennes (6 December 2025); Paris Saint-Germain 5–0 Marseille (8 February 2026)
- Biggest away win: Lorient 1–7 Lille (30 August 2025)
- Highest scoring: Toulouse 3–6 Paris Saint-Germain (30 August 2025); Strasbourg 5–4 Monaco (17 May 2026)
- Longest winning run: Lens (8 matches)
- Longest unbeaten run: Lille (13 matches)
- Longest winless run: Metz (22 matches)
- Longest losing run: Nice (6 matches)
- Highest attendance: 66,279; Marseille 3–0 Brest (8 November 2025)
- Lowest attendance: 4,810; Monaco 1–3 Lorient (16 January 2026)
- Attendance: 8,385,849 (27,405 per match)

The 2025–26 Ligue 1, also known as Ligue 1 McDonald's for sponsorship reasons, was the 88th season of the Ligue 1, France's premier football competition. It began on 15 August 2025 and concluded on 17 May 2026. The match schedule was announced on 27 June 2025.

Paris Saint-Germain were the four-time defending champions, and successfully defended the title, mathematically securing a record-extending fourteenth title, and their fifth consecutive title, with one match to spare on 13 May 2026, following a 2–0 win against closest competitors Lens.

== Teams ==
A total of eighteen teams participated in the 2025–26 edition of the Ligue 1. Lorient, Paris FC, and Metz were promoted after finishing first, second, and winning the play-off final in the 2024–25 Ligue 2, respectively. Both Lorient and Metz returned to the top flight after one year's absence, while Paris FC returned to the top flight after a forty-six year's absence. They replaced Montpellier (relegated after sixteen years in the top flight), Saint-Étienne (relegated after one year in the top flight), and Reims (relegated after seven years in the top flight).

=== Changes ===
▲ from 2024–25 Ligue 2	▼ to 2025–26 Ligue 2
Lorient; Paris FC; Metz	Montpellier; Saint-Étienne; Reims

=== Stadiums and locations ===
Location of teams in 2025–26 Ligue 1

Club	Location	Venue	Capacity	2024–25 season
Angers	Angers	Stade Raymond Kopa	18,752	14th
Auxerre	Auxerre	Stade Abbé Deschamps	21,379	11th
Brest	Brest	Stade Francis-Le Blé	15,931	9th
Le Havre	Le Havre	Stade Océane	25,178	15th
Lens	Lens	Stade Bollaert-Delelis	37,705	8th
Lille	Villeneuve-d'Ascq	Stade Pierre-Mauroy	50,186	5th
Lorient	Lorient	Stade du Moustoir	18,890	Ligue 2, 1st
Lyon	Décines-Charpieu	Groupama Stadium	59,186	6th
Marseille	Marseille	Stade Vélodrome	67,394	2nd
Metz	Longeville-lès-Metz	Stade Saint-Symphorien	28,786	Ligue 2, 3rd
Monaco	Monaco	Stade Louis II	18,523	3rd
Nantes	Nantes	Stade de la Beaujoire	35,322	13th
Nice	Nice	Allianz Riviera	35,624	4th
Paris FC	Paris (Paris 16)	Stade Jean-Bouin	20,000	Ligue 2, 2nd
Paris Saint-Germain	Paris (Paris 16)	Parc des Princes	47,926	1st
Rennes	Rennes	Roazhon Park	29,778	12th
Strasbourg	Strasbourg	Stade de la Meinau	29,230	7th
Toulouse	Toulouse	Stadium de Toulouse	33,150	10th

=== Personnel and kits ===
Team	Chairman	Manager	Captain	Kit maker	Sponsors	
Team	Chairman	Manager	Captain	Kit maker	Main	Other(s)
Angers	(France) Romain Chabane	(France) Alexandre Dujeux	(Algeria) Haris Belkebla	Nike	École Noir&Blanc	List: Front: Maison de l'Atoll, Angers; Back: None; Sleeves: None; Shorts: Système U; Socks: None
Auxerre	(France) Baptiste Malherbe	(France) Christophe Pélissier	(Ghana) Elisha Owusu	Macron	X1 Xi Wang Sports Nutrition Drink	List: Front: SPPE, JUSSIEU Secours; Back: LCR, Acadomia; Sleeves: Groupama; Shorts: Auxerre, Advise Énergie, Cichy Manutention; Socks: None
Brest	(France) Denis Le Saint	(France) Julien Lachuer	(France) Brendan Chardonnet	Adidas	Quéguiner Matériaux (H) / Yaourt Malo (A & 3)	List: Front: SILL (H) / Breizh Cola (A & 3), GUYOT Environnement, Oceania Hotels, Les Enfants de la Balle; Back: Oriance, J.Bervas Automobiles; Sleeves: Le Football à la Pointe; Shorts: E.Leclerc, Groupe SOFT; Socks: None
Le Havre	(United States) Vincent Volpe	(France) Didier Digard	(Senegal) Arouna Sangante	Joma	Winamax	List: Front: SIM Agences d'emploi; Back: SOL'S; Sleeves: DF Industrie; Shorts: Geodis, Kia Groupe Saint-Clair; Socks: None
Lens	(France) Joseph Oughourlian	(France) Pierre Sage	(France) Florian Sotoca	Puma	Auchan	List: Front: Groupe Lempereur, Nexans; Back: Murprotec, Winamax; Sleeves: Aushopping; Shorts: Boulanger, McDonald's; Socks: None
Lille	(France) Olivier Létang	(France) Bruno Génésio	(France) Benjamin André	New Balance	Boulanger	List: Front: Actual Group; Back: Aushopping, Toyota; Sleeves: eToro; Shorts: Têtes Brûlées; Socks: None
Lyon	(United States) Michele Kang	(Portugal) Paulo Fonseca	(France) Corentin Tolisso	Adidas	Emirates	List: Front: None; Back: None; Sleeves: None; Shorts: None; Socks: None
Lorient	(France) Loïc Féry	(France) Olivier Pantaloni	(France) Laurent Abergel	Umbro	Jean Floc'h	List: Front: Acadomia, Breizh Cola; Back: World of Tanks, MA Pièces Autos Bretagne; Sleeves: Actual Group; Shorts: Cité Marine, B&B Hotels; Socks: None
Marseille	(France) Alban Juster	(Senegal) Habib Beye	(Denmark) Pierre-Emile Højbjerg	Puma	CMA CGM	List: Front: Parions Sport; Back: Boulanger; Sleeves: D'Or et de Platine; Shorts: Sublime Côte d'Ivoire; Socks: None
Metz	(France) Bernard Serin	(France) Benoît Tavenot	(France) Gauthier Hein	Kappa	CAR Avenue	List: Front: MOSL Mosselle Sans Limite, Resilium AI, Malezieux, Axia Interim; Back: Technitoit, Nacon (H) / Force Glass (A); Sleeves: Eurométropole de Metz; Shorts: E. Leclerc, LCR; Socks: None
Monaco	(Russia) Dmitry Rybolovlev	(Belgium) Sébastien Pocognoli	(Switzerland) Denis Zakaria	Mizuno	APM Monaco	List: Front: Triangle Intérim, Renault 4 E-Tech; Back: Bang & Olufsen, Teddy Smith; Sleeves: RDC Coueur d'Afrique; Shorts: VBET, Fom Industrie; Socks: None
Nantes	(Poland) Waldemar Kita	(Bosnia and Herzegovina) Vahid Halilhodžić	(France) Kelvin Amian	Macron	Synergie	List: Front: Les Gars Des Eaux; Back: Préservation du Patrimoine, Groupe Millet; Sleeves: LNA Santé; Shorts: Be Green; Socks: None
Nice	(France) Jean-Pierre Rivère	(France) Claude Puel	(Brazil) Dante	Kappa	Robinhood Markets	List: Front: Actual Group; Back: Ineos Grenadier; Sleeves: Ineos; Shorts: VBET; Socks: None
Paris FC	(France) Pierre Ferracci	(France) Antoine Kombouaré	(France) Maxime Lopez	Adidas	Bahrain Victorious	List: Back: None; Sleeves: None; Shorts: None; Socks: None
Paris Saint-Germain	(Qatar) Nasser Al-Khelaifi	(Spain) Luis Enrique	(Brazil) Marquinhos	Nike	Qatar Airways	List: Front: None; Back: Snipes; Sleeves: None; Shorts: None; Socks: None
Rennes	(France) Arnaud Pouille	(France) Franck Haise	(France) Valentin Rongier	Puma	Samsic	List: Front: Association ELA; Back: Winamax, Blot Immobilier; Sleeves: None; Shorts: BWT; Socks: None
Strasbourg	(France) Marc Keller	(England) Gary O'Neil	(Netherlands) Emanuel Emegha	Adidas	Électricité de Strasbourg (H) / Winamax (A & 3)	List: Front: Hager Group, Pierre Schmidt (H) / Stoeffler (A & 3); Back: Winamax (H) / Électricité de Strasbourg (A & 3), Soprema; Sleeves: Würth; Shorts: Atheo Ingenierie; Socks: None
Toulouse	(France) Olivier Cloarec	(Spain) Carles Martínez Novell	(Denmark) Rasmus Nicolaisen	Nike	None	List: Front: None; Back: Newrest; Sleeves: None; Shorts: None; Socks: None

=== Managerial changes ===
Team	Outgoing manager	Manner of departure	Date of vacancy	Position in table	Incoming manager	Date of appointment
Lens	(Belgium) Will Still	Resigned	18 May 2025	Pre-season	(France) Pierre Sage	2 June 2025
Nantes	(France) Antoine Kombouaré	Mutual consent	20 May 2025	Pre-season	(Portugal) Luís Castro	16 June 2025
Monaco	(Austria) Adi Hütter	Sacked	9 October 2025	5th	(Belgium) Sébastien Pocognoli	11 October 2025
Nantes	(Portugal) Luís Castro	Resigned	11 December 2025	17th	(Morocco) Ahmed Kantari	11 December 2025
Nice	(France) Franck Haise	Sacked	29 December 2025	13th	(France) Claude Puel	29 December 2025
Strasbourg	(England) Liam Rosenior	Signed by Chelsea	6 January 2026	7th	(England) Gary O'Neil	7 January 2026
Metz	(France) Stéphane Le Mignan	Sacked	20 January 2026	18th	(France) Benoît Tavenot	20 January 2026
Rennes	(Senegal) Habib Beye	Sacked	9 February 2026	6th	(France) Franck Haise	18 February 2026
Marseille	(Italy) Roberto De Zerbi	Mutual consent	11 February 2026	4th	(Senegal) Habib Beye	18 February 2026
Paris FC	(France) Stéphane Gilli	Sacked	22 February 2026	15th	(France) Antoine Kombouaré	22 February 2026
Nantes	(Morocco) Ahmed Kantari	Sacked	10 March 2026	17th	(Bosnia and Herzegovina) Vahid Halilhodžić	10 March 2026

== League table ==
Pos	Team	Pld	W	D	L	GF	GA	GD	Pts	Qualification or relegation
1	Paris Saint-Germain (C)	34	24	4	6	74	29	+45	76	Qualification for the Champions League league phase
2	Lens	34	22	4	8	66	35	+31	70	Qualification for the Champions League league phase
3	Lille	34	18	7	9	52	37	+15	61	Qualification for the Champions League league phase
4	Lyon	34	18	6	10	53	40	+13	60	Qualification for the Champions League third qualifying round
5	Marseille	34	18	5	11	63	45	+18	59	Qualification for the Europa League league phase (Note: Since the 2025–26 Coupe de France winners, Lens, qualified for the Champions League via league position, the Europa League spot awarded to the cup winners was passed to the sixth-placed team, and the Conference League spot was passed to the seventh-placed team.)
6	Rennes	34	17	8	9	59	50	+9	59	Qualification for the Europa League league phase
7	Monaco	34	16	6	12	60	54	+6	54	Qualification for the Conference League play-off round
8	Strasbourg	34	15	8	11	58	47	+11	53	
9	Toulouse	34	12	9	13	47	46	+1	45	
10	Lorient	34	11	12	11	48	51	−3	45	
11	Paris FC	34	11	11	12	47	50	−3	44	
12	Brest	34	10	9	15	43	55	−12	39	
13	Angers	34	9	9	16	29	48	−19	36	
14	Le Havre	34	7	14	13	32	44	−12	35	
15	Auxerre	34	8	10	16	34	44	−10	34	
16	Nice (O)	34	7	11	16	37	60	−23	32	Qualification for the relegation play-offs
17	Nantes (R)	34	5	9	20	29	52	−23	24	Relegation to Ligue 2
18	Metz (R)	34	3	8	23	32	76	−44	17	Relegation to Ligue 2

Source: Ligue 1
Rules for classification: 1) Points; 2) Goal difference; 3) Head-to-head points; 4) Head-to-head goal difference; 5) Head-to-head goals scored; 6) Head-to-head away goals scored; 7) Goals scored; 8) Away goals scored; 9) Fair-play points (Note: Head-to-head record is used only after all the matches between the teams in question have been played).
(C) Champions; (O) Play-off winners; (R) Relegated

== Results ==
Home \ Away	ANG	AUX	BRE	HAC	LEN	LIL	LOR	OL	OM	MET	ASM	FCN	NIC	PFC	PSG	REN	STR	TFC
Angers	—	2–0	0–2	1–1	1–2	0–1	2–0	0–0	2–5	1–0	1–1	4–1	0–2	1–0	0–3	1–1	1–1	1–0
Auxerre	3–1	—	3–0	0–1	1–2	3–4	1–0	0–0	0–1	3–1	1–2	0–0	2–1	0–0	0–1	0–3	0–0	1–0
Brest	1–1	2–0	—	2–0	3–3	3–3	2–0	0–0	2–0	3–2	1–0	0–0	4–1	1–2	0–3	3–4	1–2	0–2
Le Havre	2–1	1–1	1–0	—	1–2	0–1	1–1	0–0	0–1	4–4	0–0	1–1	3–1	0–0	0–1	2–2	2–1	2–1
Lens	5–1	1–0	3–1	1–0	—	3–0	3–0	0–1	2–1	3–0	2–3	1–0	2–0	2–1	0–2	3–1	1–0	3–2
Lille	1–0	0–2	1–1	1–1	3–0	—	1–1	0–1	1–0	6–1	1–0	1–0	0–0	4–2	1–1	0–2	1–4	2–1
Lorient	2–0	2–2	3–3	0–2	2–1	1–7	—	1–0	2–0	1–1	3–1	2–1	3–1	1–1	1–1	4–0	2–3	1–1
Lyon	1–0	3–2	2–1	1–0	0–4	1–0	2–0	—	1–0	3–0	1–2	3–0	2–0	1–1	2–3	4–2	2–1	1–2
Marseille	2–2	1–0	3–0	6–2	3–1	1–2	4–0	3–2	—	3–1	1–0	0–2	1–1	5–2	1–0	3–1	2–2	2–2
Metz	1–1	1–3	0–1	0–0	2–0	0–0	0–4	2–5	0–3	—	1–2	0–0	2–1	1–3	2–3	0–1	0–1	3–4
Monaco	2–0	2–2	2–0	3–1	1–4	0–1	1–3	1–3	2–1	5–2	—	3–1	2–2	0–1	1–0	4–0	3–2	1–0
Nantes	0–1	1–0	1–1	2–0	1–2	0–2	1–1	0–1	3–0	0–2	3–5	—	1–4	1–2	0–1	2–2	2–3	0–0 (Note: Match abandoned in the 22nd minute of first half with the score at 0–0 after Nantes supporters threw projectiles and invaded the pitch. Later that month, the LFP decided to uphold the score.)
Nice	0–1	3–1	2–2	1–1	1–1	2–0	3–3	3–2	1–5	0–0	0–0	1–0	—	1–1	0–4	0–4	1–1	0–1
Paris FC	0–0	1–1	4–0	3–2	0–5	0–1	2–0	3–3	2–2	3–2	4–1	1–2	1–0	—	2–1	0–1	2–3	0–3
Paris SG	1–0	2–0	1–0	3–0	2–0	3–0	2–2	1–2	5–0	3–0	1–3	3–0	1–0	2–1	—	5–0	3–3	3–1
Rennes	2–1	2–2	3–1	1–1	0–0	1–2	0–2	3–1	1–0	0–0	4–1	2–1	1–2	2–1	3–1	—	4–1	1–0
Strasbourg	5–0	3–0	1–2	1–0	1–1	2–0	0–0	3–1	1–2	2–1	5–4	1–0	3–1	0–0	1–2	0–3	—	1–2
Toulouse	0–1	0–0	2–0	0–0	0–3	0–4	1–0	2–1	0–1	4–0	2–2	2–2	5–1	1–1	3–6	2–2	1–0	—

Source: Ligue 1
Legend: Blue = home team win; Yellow = draw; Red = away team win.
For upcoming matches, an "a" indicates there is an article about the rivalry between the two participants.

== Relegation play-offs ==
The 2025–26 season concluded with a relegation play-off between the 16th-placed Ligue 1 team, Nice, and the winner of the semi-final of the Ligue 2 play-off, Saint-Étienne, in a two-legged confrontation.

1st leg

26 May 2026
20:45 CEST (UTC+2)

Saint-Étienne	0–0	Nice
	Report

Stade Geoffroy-Guichard, Saint-Étienne
Attendance: 39,772
Referee: Benoît Bastien

2nd leg

29 May 2026
20:45 CEST (UTC+2)

Nice	4–1	Saint-Étienne
Clauss 62'; Boudache 81'; Wahi 87', 90+2'	Report	Davitashvili 79' (pen.)

Allianz Riviera, Nice
Attendance: 0 (Behind closed doors)
Referee: Ruddy Buquet

Nice won 4–1 on aggregate and therefore both clubs remained in their respective leagues.

== Season statistics ==
=== Scoring ===
- First goal of the season:
  (France) Ludovic Blas (Rennes) vs Marseille (15 August 2025)
- Last goal of the season:
  (France) Alimami Gory (Paris FC) vs Paris Saint-Germain (17 May 2026)

=== Top goalscorers ===
Rank	Player	Club	Goals
1	(France) Esteban Lepaul	Angers/Rennes^{1}	21
2	(England) Mason Greenwood	Marseille	16
2	(Argentina) Joaquín Panichelli	Strasbourg	16
4	(United States) Folarin Balogun	Monaco	13
5	(France) Odsonne Édouard	Lens	12
5	(France) Wesley Saïd	Lens	12
5	(Mali) Lassine Sinayoko	Auxerre	12
8	(France) Bradley Barcola	Paris Saint-Germain	11
8	(Spain) Ansu Fati	Monaco	11
8	(Czech Republic) Pavel Šulc	Lyon	11
8	(France) Florian Thauvin	Lens	11
8	(France) Corentin Tolisso	Lyon	11

^{1} Lepaul played for Angers until matchday 2 and scored 1 goal.

=== Hat-tricks ===
Player	Club	Against	Result	Date
(Portugal) João Neves	Paris Saint-Germain	Toulouse	6–3 (A)	30 August 2025
(England) Mason Greenwood^{4}	Marseille	Le Havre	6–2 (H)	18 October 2025
(France) Esteban Lepaul	Rennes	Strasbourg	4–1 (H)	2 November 2025
(Brazil) Endrick	Lyon	Metz	5–2 (A)	25 January 2026

Note

^{4} Player scored 4 goals

=== Clean sheets ===
Rank	Player	Club	Clean sheets
1	(Turkey) Berke Özer	Lille	13
2	(Slovakia) Dominik Greif	Lyon	11
2	(France) Robin Risser	Lens	11
4	(Burkina Faso) Hervé Koffi	Angers	10
4	(France) Brice Samba	Rennes	10
6	(France) Lucas Chevalier	Paris Saint-Germain	9
6	(French Guiana) Donovan Léon	Auxerre	9
6	(France) Guillaume Restes	Toulouse	9
9	(Belgium) Mike Penders	Strasbourg	8
9	(Argentina) Gerónimo Rulli	Marseille	8
9	(Russia) Matvey Safonov	Paris Saint-Germain	8

=== Discipline ===
==== Player ====
- Most yellow cards: 11
  - (France) Maxime Lopez (Paris FC)
  - (France) Adrien Thomasson (Lens)
- Most red cards: 2
  - (Belgium) Thibault De Smet (Paris FC)
  - (France) Ismaël Doukouré (Strasbourg)
  - (Germany) Thilo Kehrer (Monaco)
  - (French Guiana) Donovan Léon (Auxerre)
  - (Senegal) Sadibou Sané (Metz)
  - (Senegal) Arouna Sangante (Le Havre)
  - (Argentina) Nicolás Tagliafico (Lyon)

==== Team ====
- Most yellow cards: 79
  - Marseille
- Most red cards: 7
  - Auxerre
  - Lyon
- Fewest yellow cards: 34
  - Paris Saint-Germain
- Fewest red cards: 1
  - Lorient

== Awards ==
=== Monthly ===
Month	Player of the Month		Ref.
Month	Player	Club	Ref.
August	(Algeria) Ilan Kebbal	Paris FC	
September	(France) Florian Thauvin	Lens	
October	(England) Mason Greenwood	Marseille	
November	(France) Florian Thauvin	Lens	
December/January	(Brazil) Endrick	Lyon	
February	(France) Ludovic Ajorque	Brest	
March	(France) Florian Thauvin	Lens	
April	(France) Esteban Lepaul	Rennes	

=== Annual ===
Award	Winner	Club	Ref.
Player of the Season	(France) Ousmane Dembélé	Paris Saint-Germain	
Young Player of the Season	(France) Désiré Doué	Paris Saint-Germain	
Goalkeeper of the Season	(France) Robin Risser	Lens	
Goal of the Season	(France) Ousmane Dembélé	Paris Saint-Germain	
Manager of the Season	(France) Pierre Sage	Lens	

Team of the Year
Goalkeeper	(France) Robin Risser (Lens)			
Defenders	(Morocco) Achraf Hakimi (Paris Saint-Germain)	(Ecuador) Willian Pacho (Paris Saint-Germain)	(France) Malang Sarr (Lens)	(Portugal) Nuno Mendes (Paris Saint-Germain)
Midfielders	(Mali) Mamadou Sangaré (Lens)	(France) Corentin Tolisso (Lyon)		(Portugal) Vitinha (Paris Saint-Germain)
Forwards	(France) Florian Thauvin (Lens)	(France) Ousmane Dembélé (Paris Saint-Germain)		(England) Mason Greenwood (Marseille)

== Attendances ==
Ligue 1 clubs listed by average home league attendance in the 2025–26 season:

Pos	Club	Average attendance
1	Olympique de Marseille	62,612
2	Olympique Lyonnais	49,848
3	Paris Saint-Germain	47,577
4	LOSC	43,092
5	RC Lens	37,564
6	Stade Rennais	27,765
7	RC Strasbourg	27,583
8	FC Nantes	27,478
9	Toulouse FC	24,941
10	FC Metz	22,232
11	OGC Nice	22,078
12	Le Havre AC	19,253
13	Paris FC	16,899
14	AJA	16,295
15	FC Lorient	15,382
16	Stade Brestois	14,411
17	Angers SCO	11,740
18	AS Monaco	8,153

== See also ==
- 2025–26 Ligue 2
- 2025–26 Championnat National
- 2025–26 Championnat National 2
- 2025–26 Championnat National 3
- 2025–26 Coupe de France
