= Montigny-lès-Metz =

- Commune
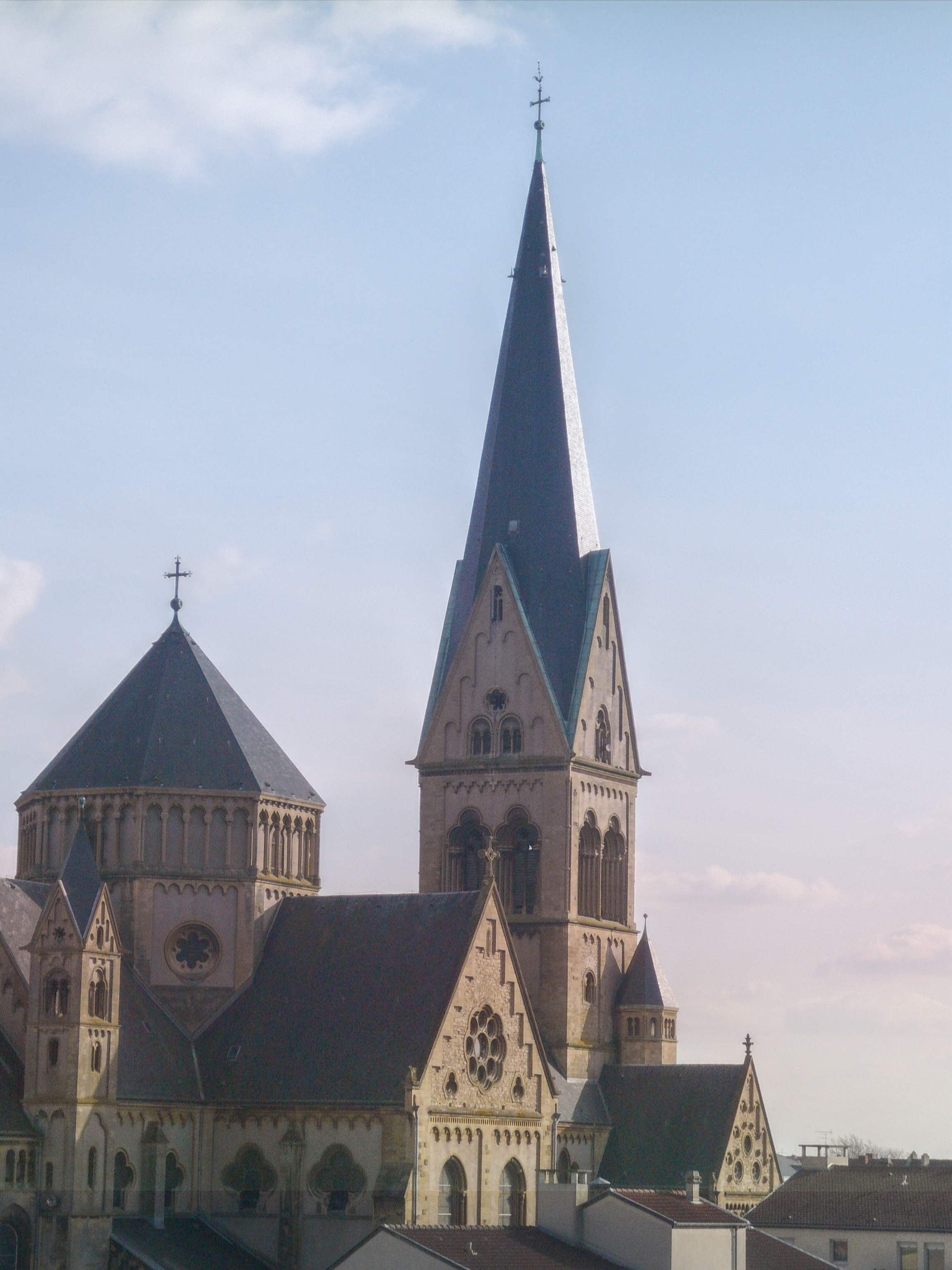
- The church in Montigny-lès-Metz

- Coat of arms
- Location of Montigny-lès-Metz
- Location within France Location within Grand Est
- Coordinates: 49°06′02″N 6°09′14″E
- Country: France
- Region: Grand Est
- Department: Moselle
- Arrondissement: Metz
- Canton: Montigny-lès-Metz
- Intercommunality: Metz Métropole

Government
  - Mayor (2020–2026): Jean-Luc Bohl (DVC)
- Area^{1}: 6.70 km^{2} (2.59 sq mi)
- Highest elevation: 190 m (620 ft)
- Lowest elevation: 165 m (541 ft)
- Population (2023): 21,718
  - Density: 3,240/km^{2} (8,400/sq mi)
- Time zone: UTC+01:00 (CET)
  - Summer (DST): UTC+02:00 (CEST)
- INSEE/Postal code: 57480 /57950
- ^{1} French Land Register data, which excludes lakes, ponds, glaciers > 1 km^{2} (0.386 sq mi or 247 acres) and river estuaries.

Montigny-lès-Metz (French pronunciation: [mɔ̃tiɲi lɛ mɛs], literally Montigny near Metz; German: Monteningen, (1940–1944) Montenich) is a commune in the Moselle department in Grand Est in north-eastern France.

It is the largest suburb of the city of Metz, and is adjacent to it on the west. From 1871 (Franco-German War) to 1919 (Treaty of Versailles), it was officially a part of the German Imperial Territory of Alsace-Lorraine.

== Population ==
Historical population

Year	Pop.	±% p.a.
1793	698	—
1800	724	+0.52%
1806	860	+2.91%
1821	972	+0.82%
1836	1,292	+1.92%
1841	1,384	+1.39%
1861	2,614	+3.23%
1866	2,673	+0.45%
1871	2,813	+1.03%
1875	2,734	−0.71%
1880	3,101	+2.55%
1885	3,272	+1.08%
1890	3,953	+3.85%
1895	6,645	+10.95%
1900	8,533	+5.13%
1905	12,079	+7.20%
1910	10,260	−3.21%

Year	Pop.	±% p.a.
1921	11,839	+1.31%
1926	11,782	−0.10%
1931	13,432	+2.66%
1936	16,789	+4.56%
1946	13,084	−2.46%
1954	19,271	+4.96%
1962	22,388	+1.89%
1968	24,520	+1.53%
1975	24,519	−0.00%
1982	22,114	−1.46%
1990	21,983	−0.07%
1999	23,437	+0.71%
2007	22,585	−0.46%
2012	21,990	−0.53%
2017	21,819	−0.16%
2023	21,718	−0.08%

Source: EHESS and INSEE (1968-2023)

== Points of interest ==
- Jardin botanique de Metz

== See also ==
- Communes of the Moselle department
