= Blau Mobilfunk =

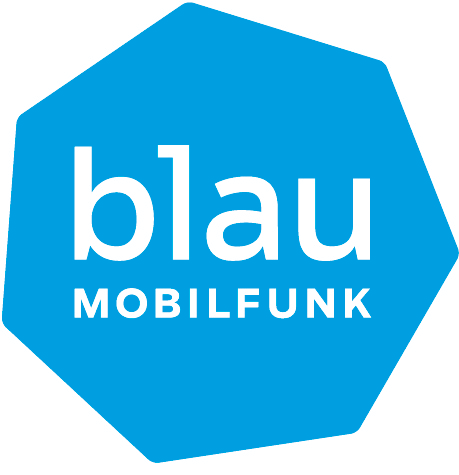
- Type: GmbH
- Industry: Mobile network operator
- Founded: Hamburg, Germany, 2005
- Defunct: 2015 (now a brand of Telefonica Germany)
- Headquarters: Hamburg, Germany
- Area served: Germany
- Key people: Gérard Lambert, Holger Feistel
- Products: Mobile phones
- Services: Mobile phone services
- Revenue: 208.8 Mio. € (2011)
- Number of employees: 108 (2011)
- Website: www.blau.de

The brand blau (previously: blau Mobilfunk GmbH), is a mobile network brand owned by Telefónica Germany. The key brands are the discount tariff "blau.de" for calls within Germany and "blauworld" for calls outside Germany.

== History ==
The company was founded by three entrepreneurs, Martin Ostermayer, Thorsten Rehling and Dirk Freise in 2005. The money came from the sale of the website handy.de to Bertelsmann.

A company for the distribution of mobile phone service with E-Plus was the base to establish Blau Mobilfunk GmbH as the first independent mobile phone discounter.

Blau Mobilfunk took over the mobile virtual network operator in the discount sector, debitel-light, in November 2006. Debitel received a minority share of the Blau Mobilfunk GmbH as compensation. 2007 blau.de already had 600,000 customers.

Blau Mobilfunk was taken over by the Dutch E-Plus-mother KPN in April 2008.

The key brands blau.de and blauworld were continued.

Blau.de also offered an allnet flatrate like Yourfone in addition to normal prepaid cards in 2012.

Thus blau.de is not only a pure prepaid discounter, but also offers handy tariffs by invoice.

Blau Mobilfunk has belonged to E-Plus since 1 January 2013. It became a brand of Telefonica Germany, which after the E-Plus acquisition in 2014 migrated customers to their main company in 2015.

== Cooperations ==
blau.de offers branded reseller partnerships to other companies, i. e. the usage of the blau.de tariff under the brand name of the partner. Hereby the customers should be connected to the brands of the partners.

At the moment there are the following cooperations:

- Netto: NettoKOM
- ATG (Arora Trading GmbH): simVOICE
- ECO World Connect GmbH: Mobilka

In cooperation with KPN Spain the discount tariff blau.es was established in Spain in October 2008. The Network of Orange Spain is used for this.

== Technology ==
blau.de initially used the network and all the technical equipment of E-Plus, which was later merged with the Telefónica O2 Germany network. The network accessibility reached 98% of the population in Germany in 2011. Connections of up to 384 kbit/s via UMTS-network and of up to 7,2 Mbit/s via HSDPA as an enhancement of UMTS were possible in 2011.
