= 2023 Kings League =

Kings League
- Season: 2023
- Dates: 1 January – 19 March 2023 (Split 1 regular season); 24 – 26 March 2023 (Split 1 playoffs); 7 May – 16 July 2023 (Split 2 regular season); 22 – 29 July 2023 (Split 2 playoffs); 10 September – 8 October 2023 (Kings Cup group stage); 10 – 14 October 2023 (Kings Cup knockout stage)
- Champions: Split 1: El Barrio (1st title); Split 2: xBuyer Team (1st title); Kings Cup: Ultimate Móstoles (1st title); Split 3: Saiyans FC (1st title)
- Matches: 115
- Goals: 717 (6.23 per match)
- Top goalscorer: Cristian Ubón; Fran Hernández (25 goals)
- Biggest home win: El Barrio 5–0 PIO FC (1 January 2023); PIO FC 5–0 Jijantes FC (12 February 2023); Aniquiladores FC 6–1 Rayo de Barcelona (4 June 2023)
- Biggest away win: PIO FC 2–9 Saiyans FC (15 July 2023)
- Highest scoring: 1K FC 7–10 Saiyans FC (4 June 2023)
- Longest winning run: Porcinos FC (6 matches)
- Longest losing run: Jijantes FC (9 matches)
- All statistics correct as of 19 June 2023.

The 2023/24 Kings League, also known as Kings League Infojobs due to sponsorship reasons, is the 1st season of Kings League Spain, a seven-a-side football competition. It commenced on 1 January 2023 with the first match day of the Winter Split, which concluded on 26 March 2023. The Summer Split began on 7 May 2023, and it is set to conclude with its Final Four on 29 July 2023.

== Venue ==
The Kings League is being held at the Cupra Arena, located in the port of Barcelona. The Cupra Arena is part of the Logistics Activities Area (ZAL in Spanish) of the Port of Barcelona. On 20 January 2023, Gerard Piqué and FC Barcelona president Joan Laporta announced that the semifinals and final of the winter split playoffs would be held as a 'Final Four' event at the Camp Nou, the home ground of FC Barcelona, on March 26, 2023.

== Teams ==
The kit manufacturer for all teams is Adidas while the kit sponsor for all teams is MediaMarkt. All teams have an "11th Player" who usually is a former professional football player and a "12th Player", a guest player who can be different for each match date

Team	Manager	Chairperson
1K FC	(Spain) José Morales	(Spain) Iker Casillas
Aniquiladores FC	(Argentina) Sergio Verdirame	(Colombia) Juan Guarnizo
El Barrio	(Spain) Juan Arroita	(Spain) Adri Contreras
Jijantes FC	(Spain) Pau Moral	(Spain) Gerard Romero
Kunisports	(Argentina) Martín Posse	(Argentina) Sergio Agüero
Los Troncos FC	(Spain) Èric Bartra	(Spain) Jaume Cremades (Perxitaa)
PIO FC	(Spain) Pol Coma	(Mexico) Samantha Rivera (Rivers)
Porcinos FC	(Equatorial Guinea) Juvenal	(Spain) Ibai Llanos
Rayo de Barcelona	(Spain) Efrén Guillén	(Andorra) Martí Miràs (Spursito)
Saiyans FC	(Spain) Daniel Romo	(Spain) David Cánovas (TheGrefg)
Ultimate Móstoles	(Spain) Álex Martínez	(Spain) Mario Alonso (DjMaRiiO)
xBuyer Team	(Spain) Víctor González	(Spain) Javier (xBuyer) and Eric Ruiz (MiniBuyer)

=== Managerial changes ===
Team	Outgoing manager	Manner of departure	Date of vacancy	Position in table	Incoming manager	Date of appointment
Rayo de Barcelona	(Spain) JuanluDBZ	Named sporting director	27 March 2023	Offseason	(Spain) Efrén Guillén	28 March 2023
PIO FC	(Mexico) Gerardo Torrado	Left to pursue other projects	6 April 2023	Offseason	(Spain) Diego Morata	9 April 2023
1K FC	(Spain) Julio García Mera	Named sporting consultant	14 April 2023	Offseason	(Spain) Sergio Ortega	14 April 2023
Jijantes FC	(Spain) Marc Carmona	Sacked	9 May 2023	9th	(Spain) Roger de la Villa (caretaker)	9 May 2023
Ultimate Móstoles	(Spain) Nacho Castro	Signed by Mineros de Zacatecas	15 May 2023	4th	(Spain) Álex Martínez	15 May 2023
Jijantes FC	(Spain) Roger de la Villa	End of caretaker spell	19 May 2023	12th	(Spain) Pau Moral	19 May 2023
Los Troncos FC	(Spain) Pol Font	Sacked	16 July 2023	Post-season	(Spain) Èric Bartra	4 August 2023
1K FC	(Spain) Sergio Ortega	Other commitments	26 July 2023	Post-season	(Spain) José Morales	18 August 2023
PIO FC	(Spain) Diego Morata	Personal reasons	12 September 2023	6th - Group A	(Spain) Pol Coma	15 September 2023

== Split 1 ==
=== Regular phase standings ===
Pos	Team	Pld	W	L	GF	GA	GD	Qualification
1	Ultimate Móstoles	11	8	3	34	27	+7	Advance to play-offs
2	Porcinos FC	11	7	4	37	26	+11	Advance to play-offs
3	Los Troncos FC	11	7	4	40	34	+6	Advance to play-offs
4	Saiyans FC	11	7	4	21	18	+3	Advance to play-offs
5	Kunisports	11	7	4	23	22	+1	Advance to play-offs
6	xBuyer Team	11	6	5	25	25	0	Advance to play-offs
7	Aniquiladores FC	11	6	5	29	30	−1	Advance to play-offs
8	El Barrio	11	5	6	33	25	+8	Advance to play-offs
9	1K FC	11	5	6	32	34	−2	
10	PIO FC	11	4	7	27	29	−2	
11	Rayo de Barcelona	11	3	8	27	40	−13	
12	Jijantes FC	11	1	10	23	41	−18	

Source: Kings League
Rules for classification: 1) Wins; 2) Goal difference; 3) Head-to-head wins; 4) Goals scored

_{H}\^{A}	1K	ANI	ELB	JFC	KNS	TFC	PIO	POR	RDB	SAI	ULT	XBU
1K FC		3:2	2:5			4:5				(3) 2:2 (4)	2:3
Aniquiladores FC				4:2	2:3			(4) 1:1 (2)		(3) 1:1 (2)	1:5
El Barrio		1:4				(1) 3:3 (4)	5:0		4:2			1:2
Jijantes FC	3:5		1:3			1:5		2:4	3:5		3:4
Kunisports	1:2		2:6	2:1		0:4		(2) 2:2 (3)			3:1
Los Troncos FC		5:7					3:2		6:3	0:1		5:3
PIO FC	3:4	2:5		5:0	(1) 2:2 (2)			(3) 0:0 (1)		(2) 1:1 (3)
Porcinos FC	5:2		5:3			5:3			5:1		4:5	4:3
Rayo de Barcelona	2:4	3:2			1:4		5:4			1:3		(0) 2:2 (3)
Saiyans FC			1:0	1:5	1:3			4:2			5:1
Ultimate Móstoles			3:2			5:1	2:3		3:2			2:1
xBuyer Team	3:2	4:0		3:2	0:1		2:5			2:1

=== Playoffs ===
The playoffs were held from 24 to 26 March 2023.

Quarterfinals; 24 March — Cupra Arena			Semifinals; 26 March ― Camp Nou			Final; 26 March ― Camp Nou
1	Ultimate Móstoles	0
8	El Barrio	3	8	El Barrio	4
4	Saiyans FC	3	4	Saiyans FC	3
5	Kunisports	2				8	El Barrio	3
2	Porcinos FC	2 (0)				7	Aniquiladores FC	0
7	Aniquiladores FC (p)	2 (3)	7	Aniquiladores FC (p)	2 (3)
3	Los Troncos FC	4	3	Los Troncos FC	2 (2)
6	xBuyer Team	2

Champion
El Barrio
1st title

=== Guest players ===
Kings League teams have the possibility to invite one player (the "12th Player") each matchday.

Team	11th Player	12th Player
1K FC	(Spain) Ricardo	(Spain) Alberto Bueno
Aniquiladores FC	(Spain) Fran Hernández	(Spain) Jordi Campoy (Week 1) (Spain) David Acedo (Week 2) (Spain) Francisco Javier Medina (Goku) (Week 3) (Spain) Nadir Louah (Weeks 4–5, 8, 10–11; Playoffs) (Argentina) Walter Erviti (Weeks 6–7) (Spain) Ezequiel Calvente (Week 9)
El Barrio	(Spain) José Juan	(Spain) Jorge Gómez (Weeks 1–2) (Spain) Alejandro Gavilán (Papi Gavi) (Week 3) (Argentina) Nicolás Pareja (Weeks 4–5, 9, 11; Quarterfinals) (Argentina) Martin Mantovani (Weeks 6–8, 10; Final Four)
Jijantes FC	(Spain) Jonathan Soriano (Weeks 1–6) (Spain) Román Golobart (Weeks 7–11)	(Spain) Nando Quesada (Week 1) (Spain) Ibai Gómez (Weeks 2, 7–11) (Spain) Pitu Comadevall (Week 3) (Spain) Joel Huertas (Weeks 4, 6) (Spain) Antonio Barragán (Week 5)
Kunisports^{1}	(Spain) Ferran Corominas	(Spain) Javi Chica (Weeks 1, 5, 9) (Argentina) Javier Saviola (Week 2) (Argentina) Sergio Agüero (Weeks 3–4; Playoffs) (Argentina) Augusto Fernández (Week 6) (Argentina) Walter Montillo (Week 8) (Argentina) Mauricio del Castillo (Week 10) (Spain) Gueri Tejedor (Week 11)
Los Troncos FC	(Spain) Carles Planas	(Spain) Joan Verdú (Weeks 1, 3–6, 8–11; Playoffs) (Spain) Víctor Sánchez (Week 2) (Spain) Carlos Omabegho (Week 7)
PIO FC	(Spain) Alberto Lopo	(Spain) Borja Criado (Week 1) (Spain) Javi Márquez (Weeks 2–4) (Spain) David García (Week 5) (Spain) Carlos Corvo (Weeks 6–11)
Porcinos FC	(Spain) Raúl Tamudo (Week 1) (Spain) Javier Espinosa (Weeks 2–11; Playoffs)	(Mexico) Chicharito (Week 1) (Spain) Hugo Fraile (Weeks 2–7, 9–11; Playoffs) (Brazil) Ronaldinho (Week 8)
Rayo de Barcelona	(Spain) Pol Marcó (Polotelli)	(Spain) Dídac Vilà (Weeks 1–6, 8–10) (Spain) Mandi Sosa (Week 7) (Andorra) Martí Miràs (Spursito) (Week 11)
Saiyans FC	(Spain) Pol Almellones (Weeks 1–10) (Spain) David López (Week 11; Playoffs)	(Spain) Joan Capdevila (Weeks 1–2, 4, 6, 8, 10–11) (Spain) Cristian Saldaña (Weeks 3, 7) (Spain) Joseba García (Week 5) (Brazil) Fernandão (Week 9; Playoffs)
Ultimate Móstoles	(Spain) Juanma González	(Spain) Sergio García (Weeks 1, 3, 6, 8–10) (Spain) Rubén de la Red (Weeks 2, 4–5) (Spain) Diego de la Mata (Week 7) (Spain) Adrià de Mesa (Week 11; Quarterfinals)
xBuyer Team	(Spain) Carlos Castro	(Spain) Koko Dembelé (Koko DC) (Week 1) (Spain) Enigma (Week 2) ^{2} (Morocco) Fouad El Amrani (Weeks 3–4, 8–11; Playoffs) (Chile) Fabián Orellana (Weeks 5–7)

1. Kunisports did not feature a 12th Player on Week 7.
2. Enigma competed in a lucha libre mask. His identity has not been disclosed.

=== Awards ===
	Best Player	Best Goalscoarer	Best Goalkeeper	Final Four MVP
Player	(Spain) Cristian Ubón	(Spain) Cristian Ubón	(Spain) Marc Briones	(Argentina) Martín Mantovani
Team	El Barrio	El Barrio	Saiyans FC	El Barrio

== Transfer market ==
A transfer market opened among all participating teams in the month of April 2023, between the Winter and Summer Splits. The rules of the market were outlined in separate livestreams before the end of the Winter Split regular season:

- The market will operate in a way similar to a virtual economy, with each team starting with a virtual €100 million budget.
- Each team chairperson can set a buyout clause for their team's ten regular players. The combined amount of money allocated by a team in the buyout clause values cannot exceed €300 million, and every player's buyout clause must be worth a minimum €1 million. There is no maximum value for a single player's buyout clause, as long as the team complies with the €300 million cap. If a team chairperson fails to present the buyout clause values by the agreed deadline, all their players will have a €30 million buyout clause.
- Guest players (11th and 12th Players) are excluded from the market.
- Teams can sign players through two different methods:
  - Buying a player out by paying the amount of money stipulated in his buyout clause. If a buyout is completed, the player cannot refuse to leave his current team; however, if multiple teams attempt a buyout for the same player, the player is allowed to choose which team he will join.
  - Negotiation between team chairpersons, which can include trading: players can be swapped for other players or exchanged for future draft picks.
- There will be a total of four transfer windows. During the first window, only signing through buyout will be allowed.
- If a buyout is activated for a player for whom an offer had been accepted but not notified to the league, the buyout prevails over the offer.
- The money teams have left after the market ends can be spent during the Summer Split in purchasing additional secret weapons (including the possibility of adding a "13th Player" for a match), or paying fines.

== Split 2 ==
A new points system Split 2 was announced on 24 April 2023:

- 3 points for a win during regular time.
- 2 points for a penalty shoot-out win.
- 1 point for a penalty shoout-out loss.
- 0 points for a loss during regular time.

This system, as well as the new playoff format, will also be used in the Queens League.

=== Regular phase standings ===
Pos	Team	Pld	W	WSO	LSO	L	GF	GA	GD	Pts	Qualification
1	Porcinos FC	11	9	0	1	1	58	32	+26	28	Advance to playoff semifinals
2	Aniquiladores FC	11	8	1	0	2	51	32	+19	26	Advance to playoff second round
3	El Barrio	11	6	1	0	4	40	36	+4	20	Advance to playoff second round
4	xBuyer Team	11	6	0	1	4	44	34	+10	19	Advance to playoff second round
5	PIO FC	11	6	0	0	5	33	47	−14	18	Advance to playoff first round
6	Jijantes FC	11	4	1	1	5	35	40	−5	15	Advance to playoff first round
7	1K FC	11	4	0	2	5	46	53	−7	14	Advance to playoff first round
8	Ultimate Móstoles	11	4	0	1	6	40	40	0	13	Advance to playoff first round
9	Kunisports	11	3	2	0	6	40	44	−4	13	Advance to playoff first round
10	Saiyans FC	11	4	0	0	7	41	47	−6	12	Advance to playoff first round
11	Rayo de Barcelona	11	3	1	0	7	30	47	−17	11	
12	Los Troncos FC	11	2	1	1	7	42	48	−6	9	

Source: Kings League
Rules for classification: 1) Points; 2) Goal difference; 3) Head-to-head points; 4) Goals scored

_{H}\^{A}	1K	ANI	ELB	JFC	KNS	TFC	PIO	POR	RDB	SAI	ULT	XBU
1K FC		5:4		5:3	(4) 4:4 (5)					7:10
Aniquiladores FC			5:2	(2) 3:3 (1)		4:3	4:1		6:1			5:3
El Barrio	5:2			5:3			3:4			3:4	3:2	3:5
Jijantes FC					1:5	4:3		4:6
Kunisports		5:10	3:4			(4) 4:4 (3)			6:7		4:3
Los Troncos FC	(2) 4:4 (1)		3:6				7:3		3:4		2:3	2:4
PIO FC	3:2			4:3	2:1					2:9
Porcinos FC	5:3	5:1	(1) 5:5 (2)		4:2	9:5	5:1		6:2			4:2
Rayo de Barcelona	1:3		0:1	2:3			4:5			5:4	(2) 3:3 (1)	1:7
Saiyans FC		1:4		2:3	1:3	3:6		4:3			2:6
Ultimate Móstoles	8:4	3:5		2:5			4:6	3:6				3:0
xBuyer Team	6:7			(2) 3:3 (4)	4:3		5:2			5:1

=== Playoffs ===
The playoffs are slated to be held from 22 to 29 July 2023, with a new ten-team format announced on 18 April 2023.

First round 22 July ― Cupra Arena
5	PIO FC	2
10	Saiyans FC	4
7	1K FC (p)	3 (4)
8	Ultimate Móstoles	3 (3)
6	Jijantes FC	4
9	Kunisports	1

Second round 25 July ― Cupra Arena
4	xBuyer Team	3
10	Saiyans FC	0
2	Aniquiladores FC	5
7	1K FC	4
3	El Barrio	2
6	Jijantes FC	1

Semifinals; 29 July ― Metropolitano
1	Porcinos FC	4 (1)
4	xBuyer Team (p)	4 (2)
2	Aniquiladores FC	1 (1)
3	El Barrio (p)	1 (3)

Final; 29 July ― Metropolitano
4	xBuyer Team (p)	4 (2)
3	El Barrio	4 (1)

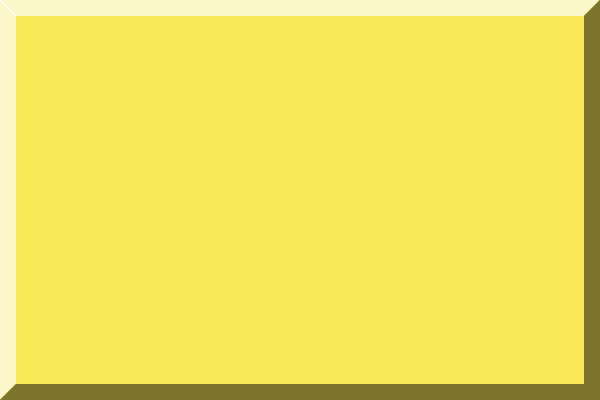
Champion
xBuyer Team
1st title

=== Guest players ===
In May 2023, the Kings League announced the addition of a 14th Player, at the time a mystery, available to only one team. It was later revealed to be World Cup and Champions League winner Andrea Pirlo, with Jijantes FC signing him.

Team	11th Player	12th Player	13th Player	14th Player
1K FC^{1}	(Spain) David Barral (Week 1)	(Spain) Borja Fernández (Week 1)	(Spain) Marc Torrejón (Weeks 1–3)	
Aniquiladores FC	(Spain) Fran Hernández (Week 1)	(Spain) Nadir Louah (Week 1)	(Spain) David Acedo (Week 2)	
El Barrio	(Argentina) Nicolás Pareja (Week 1)	(Argentina) Martín Mantovani (Week 1)		
Jijantes FC	(Spain) Román Golobart (Week 1)	(Spain) Ibai Gómez (Week 1)	(Israel) Gai Assulin (Week 1) (Spain) Nando Quesada (Week 3)	(Italy) Andrea Pirlo (Week 5)
Kunisports	(Spain) Ferran Corominas (Week 1)	(Argentina) Augusto Fernández (Week 1)	(Argentina) Mauricio del Castillo (Weeks 1–3)	
Los Troncos FC	(Spain) Carles Planas (Week 1)	(Spain) Joan Verdú (Week 1)	(Spain) Lele Montero (Week 1) (France) Djibril Cissé (Week 2) (Spain) David López (Week 3)	
PIO FC	(Spain) Alberto Lopo (Week 1)	(Spain) Carlos Corvo (Week 1)	(Spain) Gerard Artigas (Weeks 1, 3)	
Porcinos FC	(Spain) Hugo Fraile (Week 1)	(Spain) Javier Espinosa (Week 1)	(Spain) Alberto Bueno (Weeks 1–3)	
Rayo de Barcelona	(Spain) Víctor Mongil (Week 1)	(Spain) Eric Jiménez (Week 1)	(Spain) Dani Liñares (Weeks 1–3)	
Saiyans FC	(Spain) David López (Week 1)	(Spain) Roger García (Week 1)		
Ultimate Móstoles	(Spain) Juanma González (Week 1)	(Spain) Toni Paredes (Week 1)	(Spain) Gerard Vergé (Week 1) (Spain) Diego de la Mata (Week 3)	(Ukraine) Andriy Shevchenko (Week 7)
xBuyer Team	(Spain) Fernando Velillas (Week 1)	(Spain) Adri Gimeno (Week 1)	(Spain) Alexis García (Week 1) (Spain) Víctor Aliaga (Week 3)	

1. Ricardo, who was 1K's 11th Player during the Winter Split, is now considered part of the regular roster per a special request from the team.

Awards

	Regular season MVP	Best Goalscoarer	Best Goalkeeper	Final Four MVP
Player	(Spain) Nadir Louah	(Spain) Roger Carbó	(Spain) Sergi Aguilar	(Spain) Roger Carbó
Team	Aniquiladores FC	xBuyer Team	El Barrio	xBuyer Team

== Season statistics ==
=== Split 1 ===
==== Top goalscorers ====
As of 27 March 2023

Rank	Player	Club	Goals
1	(Spain) Cristian Ubón	El Barrio	17
2	(Spain) Edgar Álvaro	Los Troncos FC	15
3	(Spain) Alberto Bueno	1K FC	13
3	(Spain) Roger Carbó	Saiyans FC	13
5	(Spain) Joan Verdú	Los Troncos FC	11
5	(Spain) Juanma González	Ultimate Móstoles	11
7	(Spain) Marc Pelaz	Rayo de Barcelona	10
8	(Spain) Ferran Corominas	Kunisports	9
8	(Spain) Álvaro Arché	Ultimate Móstoles	9
8	(Spain) Joan Poch	xBuyer Team	9
11	(Spain) Fran Hernández	Aniquiladores FC	8
11	(Venezuela) Gabriel Cichero	Porcinos FC	8
11	(Spain) Hugo Fraile	Porcinos FC	8

==== Top assists ====
As of 27 March 2023

Rank	Player	Club	Assists
1	(Spain) Alberto Bueno	1K FC	8
1	(Spain) Joan Verdú	Los Troncos FC	8
3	(Spain) Javier Espinosa	Porcinos FC	7
4	(Spain) Ferran Corominas	Kunisports	6
4	(Spain) Iván López	PIO FC	6
4	(Spain) Hugo Fraile	Porcinos FC	6
4	(Spain) Francesc Purti	Rayo de Barcelona	6
8	(Spain) Fran Hernández	Aniquiladores FC	5
8	(Spain) Pablo Beguer	El Barrio	5
8	(Spain) Flavio Ruggeri	Kunisports	5
8	(Spain) Àlex Gutiérrez	Ultimate Móstoles	5

==== MVP of the week ====
After each match, a Most Valuable Player (also referred to as Simyo MVP for sponsorship reasons) is chosen. After the matchday finishes, a poll in Twitter is launched to determine which is the MVP of the week.

Week	Player	Club
1	(Spain) Juanma González	Ultimate Móstoles
2	(Spain) Ricardo	1K FC
3	(Argentina) Sergio Agüero	Kunisports
4	(Venezuela) Gabriel Cichero	Porcinos FC
5	(Spain) Joan Poch	xBuyer Team
6	(Spain) Pol Lechuga	Los Troncos FC
7	(Spain) Fran Hernández	Aniquiladores FC
8	(Spain) Edgar Álvaro	Los Troncos FC
9	(Spain) Joan Verdú	Los Troncos FC
10	(Spain) Carlos Corvo	PIO FC
11	(Spain) Uri Pons	Porcinos FC
Final Four	(Argentina) Martín Mantovani	El Barrio

A list of all MVPs awarded can be found on KingsLeague's web.

=== Split 2 ===
==== Top goalscorers ====
As of 30 July 2023

Rank	Player	Club	Goals
1	(Spain) Roger Carbó	xBuyer Team	20
2	(Spain) Fran Hernández	Aniquiladores FC	19
3	(Spain) Marc Granero	1K FC	18
4	(Spain) Cristian Ubón	Ultimate Móstoles	14
4	(Spain) Ferran Corominas	Kunisports	14
4	(Spain) Hugo Fraile	Porcinos FC	14
4	(Spain) Marc Pelaz	Los Troncos FC	14
8	(Spain) Alberto Bueno	Porcinos FC	12
8	(Spain) Nadir Louah	Aniquiladores FC	12
8	(Spain) Gilles Vidal	El Barrio	12
8	(Spain) David Barral	1K FC	12
12	(Spain) Joan Verdú	Los Troncos FC	11
12	(Spain) Álvaro Arché	El Barrio	11

==== Top assists ====
As of 30 July 2023

Rank	Player	Club	Assists
1	(Spain) Javier Espinosa	Porcinos FC	10
2	(Spain) Pablo Beguer	xBuyer Team	8
2	(Spain) Hugo Fraile	Porcinos FC	8
4	(Spain) Joan Verdú	Los Troncos FC	7
4	(Spain) Mark Sorroche	Los Troncos	7
4	(Spain) Marc Torrejón	1K FC	7
7	(Spain) Álvaro Arché	El Barrio	6
7	(Spain) Nando Quesada	Jijantes FC	6

==== MVP of the week ====
Week	Player	Club
1	(Spain) Dani Liñares	Rayo de Barcelona
2	(Spain) Joan Verdú	Los Troncos FC
3	(Spain) Pablo Beguer	xBuyer Team
4	(Spain) Carlos Corvo	PIO FC
5	(Spain) Fran Hernández	Aniquiladores FC
6	(Argentina) Sergio Agüero	Kunisports
7	(Spain) Noel Bayarri	Porcinos FC
8	(Spain) Pol Zapata	Aniquiladores FC
9	(Spain) Tom Diawara	Jijantes FC
10	(Spain) Nadir Louah	Aniquiladores FC
11	(Spain) Cristian Ubón	Ultimate Móstoles
Playoff 1-2R	(Spain) Nadir Louah	Aniquiladores FC
Final Four	(Spain) Roger Carbó	xBuyer Team

== Kings Cup (September–October 2023) ==
The 2023 Kings Cup is set to begin on 10 September 2023 and conclude on 14 October 2023.

=== Group stage ===
The groups were drawn during the Draft Day event on 4 September 2023.

Group A	Group B
Porcinos FC; xBuyer Team; Ultimate Móstoles; Los Troncos FC; PIO FC; Jijantes FC	Aniquiladores FC; El Barrio; Kunisports; Saiyans FC; 1K FC; Rayo de Barcelona

==== Group A ====
Pos	Team	Pld	W	WSO	LSO	L	GF	GA	GD	Pts	Qualification
1	Ultimate Móstoles	5	4	0	0	1	18	10	+8	12	Knockout stage
2	Jijantes FC	5	3	0	0	2	21	19	+2	9	Knockout stage
3	Porcinos FC	5	3	0	0	2	14	13	+1	9	Knockout stage
4	Los Troncos FC	5	2	0	0	3	20	18	+2	6	Knockout stage
5	xBuyer Team	5	2	0	0	3	17	19	−2	6	
6	PIO FC	5	1	0	0	4	20	31	−11	3	

Source: Kings League
Rules for classification: 1) Points; 2) Goal difference; 3) Head-to-head points; 4) Goals scored

10 September 2023
17:00 CEST

Porcinos FC	3–2	Los Troncos FC
Fraile 20'; Gutiérrez 20+1'; Coll 39'		Verdú 21' (pen.), 33'

Cupra Arena, Barcelona
10 September 2023
20:00 CEST

xBuyer Team	1–3	Ultimate Móstoles
Velillas 1'; Clotet (yellow card) 31'		Corominas 7', 10'; Ubón 32' (pen.)

Cupra Arena, Barcelona
10 September 2023
21:00 CEST

PIO FC	3–6	Jijantes FC
I. López 19'; J. González 40+1' (x2)		Quesada 12', 36' (pen.); Contreras 14'; D. López 16' (pen.); Pérez 40+2' (x2)

Cupra Arena, Barcelona

17 September 2023
16:00 CEST

Los Troncos FC	5–2	xBuyer Team
Verdú 2', 20'; Vives (yellow card) 17' (yellow-red card) 40+2'; Sorroche 29', 40+3' (x2)		Beguer 7'; Carbó 8' (pen.)

Cupra Arena, Barcelona
17 September 2023
19:00 CEST

Ultimate Móstoles	8–3	PIO FC
Ubón 3'; Bueno 5' (pen.), 9', 20+1', 20+3'; Lage 13' (yellow card) 33'; Corominas 15'; Bañuls 30'		Corvo 5' (pen.), 20', 20+2'

Cupra Arena, Barcelona
17 September 2023
20:00 CEST

Porcinos FC	2–3	Jijantes FC
Eribo 18'; D. Pérez 33'		Juste 30'; Espinar 40+2' (x2)

Cupra Arena, Barcelona

24 September 2023
16:00 CEST

Los Troncos FC	8–5	Jijantes FC
Golobart 7'; Álvaro 17', 32', 36' (pen.); Verdú 18' (pen.); Pelaz 19'; Sorroche 40+1' (x2)		Ayats 5'; Contreras 12'; Quesada 20'; Espinar 39' (x2)

Cupra Arena, Barcelona
24 September 2023
18:00 CEST

Porcinos FC	1–3	Ultimate Móstoles
Liencres 33'		Pizarro (yellow card) 20+1'; Lage 28'; Ubón 38' (pen.); Corominas 38' (pen.)

Cupra Arena, Barcelona
24 September 2023
20:00 CEST

xBuyer Team	8–5	PIO FC
Velillas 10'; Carbó 11' (pen.), 20', 20+1', 20+2'; Gimeno (yellow card) 16' (goal) 33'; Ruggeri 19'; Beguer 23'		Corvo 5' (pen.); J. González 20'; A. González 20+1', 20+2' de la Cruz 22'

Cupra Arena, Barcelona

1 October 2023
16:00 CEST

xBuyer Team	5–3	Jijantes FC
Carbó 2', 18' (pen.), 37' (x2); Omabegho 26'		López 7' (pen.) (yellow card) 40+1'; Contreras 20+2'; Juste 33'

Cupra Arena, Barcelona
1 October 2023
17:00 CEST

Ultimate Móstoles	3–1	Los Troncos FC
Bueno 3'; Corominas 7'; Ubón 9' (pen.)		Verdú 9' (pen.); Planas (yellow card) 12'

Cupra Arena, Barcelona
1 October 2023
19:00 CEST

Porcinos FC	5–4	PIO FC
Liencres 6'; Eribo 23'; Santos (red card) 32'; Louah 36'; Coll 40+1' (x2) (yellow card) 40+2'		de la Cruz 4'; Ropero 17', 18'; J. González 19'

Cupra Arena, Barcelona

8 October 2023
17:00 CEST

Ultimate Móstoles	1–4	Jijantes FC
Bueno 6'		López 13' (pen.); Quesada 19', 20', 20+1'

Cupra Arena, Barcelona
8 October 2023
18:00 CEST

Porcinos FC	3–1	xBuyer Team
Louah 7' (pen.) (yellow card) 20' (yellow-red card) 32'; Fraile 7'; Do. Pérez 18'; Cárdenas (yellow card) 26'		Beguer 20+1'; Ruggeri (yellow card) 21'; Clotet (yellow card) 37'

Cupra Arena, Barcelona
8 October 2023
21:00 CEST

PIO FC	5–4	Los Troncos FC
J. González 6', 30', 33'; A. González 27'; Corvo 38' (pen.)		Sorroche 5'; Álvaro 17'; Pelaz 20+1'; I. González 37'

Cupra Arena, Barcelona

==== Group B ====
Pos	Team	Pld	W	WSO	LSO	L	GF	GA	GD	Pts	Qualification
1	Aniquiladores FC	5	4	0	0	1	20	14	+6	12	Knockout stage
2	Saiyans FC	5	3	0	0	2	19	13	+6	9	Knockout stage
3	Rayo de Barcelona	5	2	1	0	2	18	18	0	8	Knockout stage
4	El Barrio	5	2	0	1	2	16	17	−1	7	Knockout stage
5	1K FC	5	1	1	0	3	11	19	−8	5	
6	Kunisports	5	1	0	1	3	11	14	−3	4	

Source: Kings League
Rules for classification: 1) Points; 2) Goal difference; 3) Head-to-head points; 4) Goals scored

10 September 2023
16:00 CEST

El Barrio	2–1	1K FC
Nolla		Pluvins 30'; Aguilar (yellow card) 40'

Cupra Arena, Barcelona
10 September 2023
18:00 CEST

Kunisports	3–2	Rayo de Barcelona
Pareja 20'; F. Hernández 40' (x2)		Poch 19'; P. Hernández 20+1'

Cupra Arena, Barcelona
10 September 2023
19:00 CEST

Saiyans FC	1–2	Aniquiladores FC
Boada 18' (pen.)		Espinosa 23'; Ortega 27'

Cupra Arena, Barcelona

17 September 2023
17:00 CEST

1K FC	2–8	Saiyans FC
Granero 8' (pen.); Guerrero 26'		Boada 4', 6' (pen.), 20+1'; Liñares 16'; P. Fernández 19'; Coca 29'; Galvany 39' (x2); Ribeiro (red card) 40+1'

Cupra Arena, Barcelona
17 September 2023
18:00 CEST

Rayo de Barcelona	3–3	El Barrio
Hernández 12'; Jiménez 18'; Poch 20+1'; Cichero (yellow card) 31'		Nolla 20'; Gi. Vidal 20+2' (yellow card) 21'; González 32'
Penalties
Poch (penalty scored); Purti (penalty scored); Blanco (penalty missed); Cichero (penalty scored); Hernández (penalty scored)	4–3	(penalty scored) Fernández; (penalty scored) Nolla; (penalty missed) Gi. Vidal; (penalty scored) Macharashvili; (penalty missed) González

Cupra Arena, Barcelona
17 September 2023
21:00 CEST

Aniquiladores FC	2–0	Kunisports
Rovira 10' (pen.); Macarulla 16'; Mongil (yellow card) 24'

Cupra Arena, Barcelona

24 September 2023
17:00 CEST

Rayo de Barcelona	2–3	1K FC
Hernández 15' (pen.); Cichero 19'; Jiménez (yellow card) 34'		Dalmau (yellow card) 7' (goal) 29'; Ruiz 14'; Granero 14' (pen.)

Cupra Arena, Barcelona
24 September 2023
19:00 CEST

Kunisports	2–3	Saiyans FC
Aguilar (yellow card) 3'; Inés (yellow card) 25'; Hernández (yellow card) 38'		Boada 1', 4' (pen.); Coca (yellow card) 16'; Mantovani 20+1'

Cupra Arena, Barcelona
24 September 2023
21:00 CEST

El Barrio	2–4	Aniquiladores FC
Nolla 20'; Ruiz 20+1'		Rovira 18' (pen.); Alba 28'; Espinosa 31'; Ros 34'

Cupra Arena, Barcelona

1 October 2023
18:00 CEST

Saiyans FC	5–4	El Barrio
Boada 5', 19', 38' (pen.); Liñares 20'; Mantovani 20+1'		Nolla 1' (pen.); Arché 15', 34'; Gi. Vidal 20'; Valiente (yellow card) 36'

Cupra Arena, Barcelona
1 October 2023
20:00 CEST

Aniquiladores FC	7–8	Rayo de Barcelona
J. Ruiz 3', 29'; Espinosa 15', 33', 35'; Reyes (yellow card) 30' (goal) 40+2' (x2)		Hernández 13' (pen.), 15' (pen.), 38' (pen.), 39' (x2); Jiménez 19' (yellow card) 32'; Maldonado 26'; Poch 30'; Cichero (yellow card) 40+1'

Cupra Arena, Barcelona
1 October 2023
21:00 CEST

Kunisports	2–2	1K FC
Hernández 2' (pen.); Ascaso 16'		Granero 19', 20+1'
Penalties
Inés (penalty scored); Gestí (penalty scored); Sánchez (penalty missed); Pareja (penalty scored); Hernández (penalty missed); Martínez (penalty missed)	3–4	(penalty scored) Granero; (penalty scored) Alsina; (penalty missed) Dalmau; (penalty scored) Ruiz; (penalty missed) Pluvins; (penalty scored) Guerrero

Cupra Arena, Barcelona

8 October 2023
16:00 CEST

El Barrio	5–4	Kunisports
Ga. Vidal 15'; Gi. Vidal 17' (pen.) 39'; Nolla 19'; Valiente 27'		Hernández 19', 38' (pen.); Pareja 20+1'; Inés 20+3'

Cupra Arena, Barcelona
8 October 2023
19:00 CEST

Rayo de Barcelona	3–2	Saiyans FC
Hernández 5'; Jiménez 20' (yellow card) 40'; Cichero 40+1'		Boada 18' (pen.), 20+1'

Cupra Arena, Barcelona
8 October 2023
20:00 CEST

1K FC	3–5	Aniquiladores FC
Arnalot (red card) 20+2'; D. Ruiz 38'; Torrejón 40+1' (x2)		Ortega 18', 20', 20+4' (pen.); Zapata (yellow card) 24'; G. Ruiz 31'; Rovira 35'

Cupra Arena, Barcelona

=== Knockout stage ===
The format for the knockout stage was unveiled on 18 September 2023.

First round
1A	Ultimate Móstoles	4
1B	Aniquiladores FC	2
3A	Porcinos FC	3
3B	Rayo de Barcelona	2
2A	Jijantes FC	2
4B	El Barrio	5
2B	Saiyans FC	4
4A	Los Troncos FC	5

Quarterfinals
1B	Aniquiladores FC	4
3A	Porcinos FC	2
4B	El Barrio	1
4A	Los Troncos FC	5

Semifinal
1B	Aniquiladores FC	0
4A	Los Troncos FC	2

Final
1A	Ultimate Móstoles	8
4A	Los Troncos FC	1

First round

10 October 2023
18:00 CEST

Jijantes FC	2–5	El Barrio
Quesada 17' (pen.), 19'		Nolla 18' (pen.); Arché 20+2'; Gi. Vidal 33'; Ruiz 40+5' (x2)

Cupra Arena, Barcelona

10 October 2023
19:00 CEST

Saiyans FC	4–5	Los Troncos FC
P. Fernández 14' (yellow card) 32'; Boada 17' (pen.); Liñares 20+1', 38' (pen.)		Verdú 15' (pen.), 33' (pen.); Sorroche 20'; Planas 40' (x2); Sánchez (yellow card) 40+5'

Cupra Arena, Barcelona

10 October 2023
20:00 CEST

Porcinos FC	3–2	Rayo de Barcelona
Boniquet 4', 5' (pen.); Gutiérrez 12'		Román 19'; Poch 38'

Cupra Arena, Barcelona

10 October 2023
21:00 CEST

Ultimate Móstoles	4–2	Aniquiladores FC
Bueno 16' (pen.); Torrus 20+2', 38'; Ubón 27'		J. Ruiz 12'; Espinosa 14' (pen.)

Cupra Arena, Barcelona

Quarterfinals

11 October 2023
18:00 CEST

El Barrio	1–5	Los Troncos FC
Nolla 18' (pen.)		Verdú 17' (pen.); Planas 19'; Pelaz 22'; Vives 25'; Álvaro 38' (pen.)

Cupra Arena, Barcelona

11 October 2023
20:00 CEST

Aniquiladores FC	4–2	Porcinos FC
Espinosa 16' (pen.) (yellow card) 33'; Reyes 19'; Ortega 20'; Rovira 34'		Briones 20+3'; Louah 20+3'

Cupra Arena, Barcelona

Semifinal

14 October 2023
18:45 CEST

Los Troncos FC	2–0	Aniquiladores FC
Sánchez 13'; Sorroche 15'

La Rosaleda, Málaga

Final

14 October 2023
21:45 CEST

Ultimate Móstoles	8–1	Los Troncos FC
Ubón 16' (pen.); Vidal 20'; Torrus 20'; A. Martí 24' (yellow card) 40'; Lage 40' (x2); Bueno 40+4' (x2)		Verdú 34' (yellow card) 38'; González (yellow card) 40'; Sánchez (yellow card) 40'

La Rosaleda, Málaga

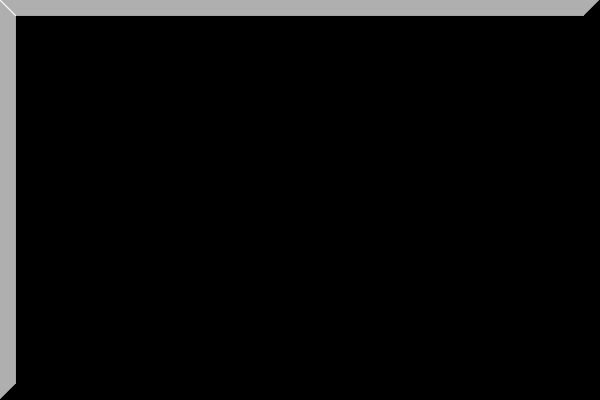
Champion
Ultimate Móstoles
1st title

== Split 3 ==
The 2024 Winter Split is still considered part of the 2023 season before the adoption of a new calendar model starting with the 2024–25 season. It began on 21 January and is set to conclude on 20 April 2024.

=== Regular phase standings ===
Pos	Team	Pld	W	WSO	LSO	L	GF	GA	GD	Pts	Qualification
1	Aniquiladores FC	11	7	1	0	3	44	34	+10	23	Playoff semifinals and 2024 Kings World Cup
2	Saiyans FC	11	7	1	0	3	37	28	+9	23	Playoff second round and 2024 Kings World Cup
3	Jijantes FC	11	7	0	0	4	32	37	−5	21	Playoff second round and 2024 Kings World Cup
4	Ultimate Móstoles	11	6	1	0	4	43	20	+23	20	Playoff second round and 2024 Kings World Cup
5	Los Troncos FC	11	6	1	0	4	33	28	+5	20	Playoff first round and 2024 Kings World Cup
6	1K FC	11	5	1	2	3	36	36	0	19	Playoff first round and 2024 Kings World Cup
7	Kunisports	11	4	1	1	5	30	32	−2	15	Playoff first round and 2024 Kings World Cup
8	Porcinos FC	11	4	0	3	4	42	45	−3	15	Playoff first round and 2024 Kings World Cup
9	xBuyer Team	11	4	1	0	6	42	39	+3	14	Playoff first round and 2024 Kings World Cup Redemption Game
10	El Barrio	11	4	0	0	7	33	40	−7	12	Playoff first round and 2024 Kings World Cup Redemption Game
11	PIO FC	11	3	1	0	7	31	47	−16	11	2024 Kings World Cup Redemption Game
12	Rayo de Barcelona	11	1	0	2	8	27	44	−17	5	2024 Kings World Cup Redemption Game

Source: Kings League
Rules for classification: 1) Points; 2) Goal difference; 3) Head-to-head points; 4) Goals scored

=== Playoffs ===
First round 14 April — Cupra Arena
5	Los Troncos FC	4
10	El Barrio	3
7	Kunisports	1
8	Porcinos FC	3
6	1K FC	3
9	xBuyer Team	10

Second round 15 April ― Cupra Arena
4	Ultimate Móstoles (p)	1 (3)
5	Los Troncos FC	1 (0)
2	Saiyans FC	5
8	Porcinos FC	4
3	Jijantes FC (p)	1 (2)
9	xBuyer Team	1 (1)

Semifinals; 20 April ― WiZink Center
1	Aniquiladores FC	4
4	Ultimate Móstoles	6
2	Saiyans FC	4
3	Jijantes FC	2

Final; 20 April ― WiZink Center
4	Ultimate Móstoles	3
2	Saiyans FC	4

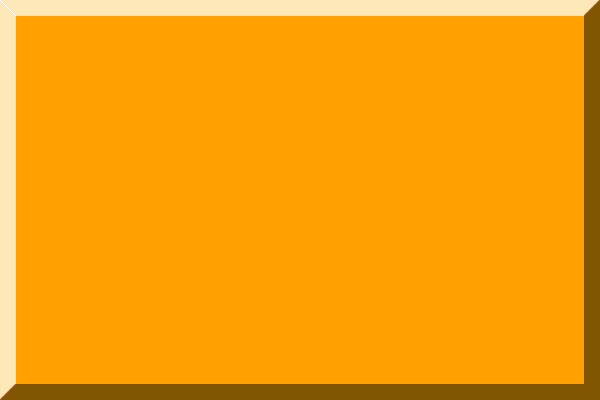
Champion
Saiyans FC
1st title
