= Tawkers =

Instant messaging software

- Original authors: Blake Ian; (CEO & Co-Founder); Rachael Workman; (Director, Co-Founder); Rodrigo Bartels; (CTO)
- Developer: Tawkers Inc
- Platform: SaaS, Web
- Available in: English
- Website: Tawkers.com

Tawkers is a Saas application, which allows publishers to create and distribute branded text message conversations live or after the fact. The application is created for various devices, but was originally launched as an iPhone app and has become a set of content tools for brand marketers and publishers. Tawkers is owned and managed by Tawkers Inc, which was founded in 2011.

The company launched a beta of Tawkers as a web application in 2013, before releasing the official version in March 2014. Gizmodo Brazil ranked Tawkers in their list of top iPhone Apps for that particular month.

In 2016, Tawkers began work on a SaaS product, creating an enterprise solution for brands, agencies and publishers to create and manage public messaging content between influencers. The content is then embedded across the client's media. This new offering followed a partnership with NBCUniversal and 360i in which the companies utilized the technology to create content for their owned, earned and paid media channels, as well as within mobile applications. The first campaign was with the Bravo TV show Odd Mom Out.

== Background ==
Blake Ian is the current CEO and co-founded the company in 2011 in New York City after having the idea of sharing text conversations while he was chatting with a friend about a film over instant messaging. In late 2011, after developing the idea, the company received $360,000 in seed funding.

Following the development of a beta in 2013, Ian stated to TechCrunch that he believed that celebrities would use the Tawkers platform as a way to engage with fans and also engage conversation on given subjects.

The app did just that in the early stages of the beta, with Lee Camp, Ron "Bumblefoot" Thal, Colin Quinn, singer Eleanor Goldfield, Deepak Chopra, and also Howard Rheingold using the app during the early parts of its existence.

In March 2014, Gizmodo Brazil ranked Tawkers in their list of top Apps.

== Mechanics ==
According to their website, the application aims to bridge the gap between private text messaging and public expression, providing marketers and publishers a solution for creating mass amounts of high engaging content for no production cost and minor effort from influential brand ambassadors.

The SaaS platform works by allowing marketing professionals and content creators to create publicly accessible chats. These chats are then embedded across the internet within owned, earned and paid media channels as well as mobile applications. In 2014, Ian commented on the desire for people to share their own text conversations and read conversations by others, particularly celebrities. The example he gave was when Macklemore texted Kendrick Lamar, after Macklemore's Grammy success and then tweeted an image of the conversation which went viral.

== See also ==
- Yope
- Upptalk
