= Jotha =

Spanish footballer

Personal information
- Full name: Jonathan Pérez Olivero
- Date of birth: 6 June 1982 (age 44)
- Place of birth: Tinajo, Spain
- Height: 1.74 m (5 ft 9 in)
- Position: Winger

Team information
- Current team: Tønsberg

Youth career
- CD Tinajo
- 1998–1999: Lanzarote
- 1999–2001: Las Palmas

Senior career*
Years	Team	Apps	(Gls)
2001–2003	Las Palmas B		
2001–2002	→ Universidad LP (loan)	33	(0)
2003	Las Palmas	15	(0)
2004–2006	Real Madrid B	71	(0)
2004	Real Madrid	1	(0)
2006–2007	Ponferradina	25	(0)
2007–2008	Universidad LP	0	(0)
2008	→ Orientación Marítima (loan)		
2008–2014	Lanzarote	163	(15)
2015	Tønsberg		
2015–2016	Unión Sur Yaiza	9	(0)
2016–	Tønsberg	0	(0)
- * Club domestic league appearances and goals as of 23 January 2016

Jonathan Pérez Olivero (born 6 June 1982), commonly known as Jotha, is a Spanish former footballer who played for Norwegian club FK Tønsberg mainly as a right winger.

== Football career ==
Born in Tinajo, Lanzarote, Jotha graduated through UD Las Palmas' youth system, having arrived from neighbours UD Lanzarote. In January 2004, after 15 games in 2003–04's second division with the first team – with the campaign eventually ending in relegation – he moved to Real Madrid, spending almost two entire seasons with its reserves.

Jotha appeared in one match with the La Liga powerhouse: on 21 September 2004, he played three minutes in a 1–0 home win against CA Osasuna after replacing legendary Raúl.

Released in June 2006, Jotha played one season in the second level with SD Ponferradina (relegation), then continued his career in the lower leagues, mainly in his native Canary Islands. In 2008, ten years after leaving, he returned to Lanzarote in division three.

Aged 32, Jotha moved abroad for the first time in his career, signing with FK Tønsberg in the Norwegian 3. divisjon and helping to promotion. In late January 2016, following a brief spell back in his country with CD Unión Sur Yaiza, he returned to his previous club.
