= Nacho Castro =

Spanish footballer and manager

Personal information
- Full name: Ignacio Castro García
- Date of birth: 30 June 1971 (age 55)
- Place of birth: Avilés, Spain
- Height: 1.76 m (5 ft 9 in)
- Position: Midfielder

Team information
- Current team: Venados (manager)

Youth career
- Colegio San Fernando
- Peña Blanquiazul
- Avilés

Senior career*
Years	Team	Apps	(Gls)
1989–1992	Avilés	83	(5)
1992–1995	Barcelona B	44	(2)
1995–1996	Deportivo B	23	(0)
1996–1997	Avilés	36	(2)
1997–1998	Murcia	16	(0)
1998–1999	Jaén	36	(1)
1999–2000	Avilés	28	(1)
2000–2001	Ávila	24	(0)
2001–2003	Zamora	64	(7)
2003–2004	Lanzarote	36	(4)
2004–2005	Fuerteventura	15	(1)
2005–2006	Logroñés	48	(2)
2006–2007	Orientación Marítima	33	(1)
2007–2008	Eldense	36	(1)
2008–2009	Guíxols	32	(4)
Total		554	(31)

Managerial career
- 2009–2010: Guíxols
- 2010–2011: Sant Feliu (youth)
- 2011–2015: Peralada
- 2015–2016: Girona B
- 2016–2017: Farners
- 2017–2020: Horta
- 2020–2021: Andorra
- 2021–2022: San Fernando
- 2023: Ultimate Móstoles (KL)
- 2023–2024: Zacatecas
- 2024–2025: Atlético Morelia
- 2025–: Venados
- * Club domestic league appearances and goals

Ignacio "Nacho" Castro García (born 30 June 1971) is a Spanish football coach and a former player who played mainly as a defensive midfielder. He is the manager of Liga de Expansión MX club Venados.

== Playing career ==
Born in Avilés, Asturias, Castro began his career with local side Real Avilés, making his senior debut in 1989 at the age of just 18 and establishing himself as a starter in the following year, as his side achieved promotion from Segunda División B. He made his professional debut on 9 September 1990, playing the last 26 minutes in a 0–2 Segunda División away loss against Elche CF.

Castro scored his first professional goal on 26 May 1991, netting his team's third in a 3–3 home draw against Palamós CF. In 1992, after suffering relegation, he moved to fellow second division side Barcelona B.

After leaving Barça in 1995, Castro resumed his career mainly in the third division, representing Deportivo de La Coruña B, Avilés (two stints), Real Murcia, Real Jaén, Real Ávila CF, Zamora CF, UD Lanzarote, UD Fuerteventura, Logroñés CF and CD Orientación Marítima. He then signed for Tercera División side CD Eldense in 2007, before retiring with Primera Catalana side AD Guíxols in 2009.

== Coaching career ==
Immediately after retiring, Castro was named manager of his last side Guíxols. He subsequently worked in the youth sides of EF Sant Feliu before being appointed in charge of CF Peralada in 2011.

On 19 May 2015, after achieving promotion to the fourth division, Castro left Peralada. He took over Girona FC B on 12 June, with the club later becoming the second reserve side behind Peralada.

On 3 July 2016, Castro was appointed manager of CE Farners, but left the following 2 February. He took over UA Horta in the following year, before replacing Gabri at the helm of FC Andorra in the third division on 25 February 2020.

On 18 January 2021, Castro was sacked by Andorra. On 6 July, he was named in charge of San Fernando CD.

At the end of 2022 Castro was hired as coach by Ultimate Móstoles, team that plays at the Kings League, a seven-a-side football league in Barcelona. After finishing the first tournament, he left office.

On 7 May 2023, Castro was appointed as manager of Mineros de Zacatecas, a team that plays in the Liga de Expansión MX, the second division of the Mexican football system. On 18 November 2024, he was appointed as manager of Atlético Morelia. He left the position in June 2025.

In August 2025 Castro was named as the new manager of Mexican team Venados F.C.

== Managerial statistics ==
As of match played 3 March 2025

Managerial record by team and tenure
Team	Nat	From	To	Record								Ref
Team	Nat	From	To	G	W	D	L	GF	GA	GD	Win %	Ref
Guíxols	(Spain)	1 July 2009	30 June 2010	38	12	14	12	45	44	+1	31.58	
Peralada	(Spain)	1 July 2011	19 May 2015	140	61	34	45	216	172	+44	43.57	
Girona B	(Spain)	12 June 2015	3 July 2016	34	11	8	15	45	46	−1	32.35	
Farners	(Spain)	3 July 2016	2 February 2017	19	7	7	5	27	25	+2	36.84	
Horta	(Spain)	21 June 2017	25 February 2020	105	47	24	34	143	129	+14	44.76	
Andorra	(Andorra)	25 February 2020	18 January 2021	14	6	5	3	15	13	+2	42.86	
San Fernando	(Spain)	6 July 2021	21 September 2022	43	14	10	19	54	65	−11	32.56	
Zacatecas	(Mexico)	7 May 2023	12 November 2024	51	21	14	16	86	66	+20	41.18	
Atlético Morelia	(Mexico)	19 November 2024	2 June 2025	18	8	3	7	23	25	−2	44.44	
Venados	(Mexico)	21 August 2025		0	0	0	0	0	0	+0	—	
Total				462	187	119	156	654	585	+69	40.48	—
