= Kings League Spain =

Seven-a-side football league in Spain

- Founded: 10 November 2022; 3 years ago
- First season: 2023
- Country: Spain
- Number of clubs: 12
- Current champions: Jijantes FC (1st title, Kings League Spain) (4th Split, September–December 2024)
- Broadcaster(s): Twitch; YouTube; TikTok
- Website: kingsleague.pro
- Current: 2024–25 Kings League

The Kings League is a Spanish seven-a-side football league established in late 2022 by former football player Gerard Piqué. The league features rules that differ from traditional football regulations, such as a tie-breaker penalty shootout, unlimited substitutions, and the implementation of secret weapons, to add an element of dynamism and entertainment to the games.

== Format ==
The Kings League follows an Apertura and Clausura-style format in which each season is divided into two splits: the Winter Split and the Summer Split. Both splits have their league stage and playoffs. During the league stage, the twelve teams play eleven matchdays and face every other team once. Based on their rankings at the end of the league stage, the top eight teams advance to the playoffs. Each matchday features six forty-minute matches, divided into two twenty-minute halves, played consecutively on the same ground.

For the inaugural season, players were given the opportunity to apply and were selected through a draft process that took place on 27 December 2022. Prospective players underwent physical and skill testing before the top prospects were drafted. Each team can have twelve players on the roster: the draft involved selecting ten players, with the two additional roster slots reserved for guest players. These players are known as the 11th and 12th Players, usually footballers or streamers. The 12th player can change on each match day, while the 11th player is meant to stay with the team for the entire season.

== Rules ==
The Kings League's rules were created through a social media voting process. Fans were given the opportunity to contribute and vote on the rules.

The unconventional rules include a tie-breaker penalty shootout from the center of the field, the use of offsides, the allowance of handballs for throw-ins, unlimited substitutions, yellow cards resulting in a 2-minute exclusion, and red cards resulting in a 5-minute exclusion until a substitute can enter. The game starts with the ball in the center of the field and players starting from the back line. Games are divided into two 20-minute halves, and special "secret weapons" are included that each team can use once per game from halftime up until the end. These secret weapons include the following:

- Penalty – An automatic penalty kick.
- Shoot-out – A penalty scenario where the player starts from midfield and has a one-on-one breakaway with the opposing goalkeeper. The player must shoot within five seconds but can make as many moves as possible in up to five seconds between starting that breakaway and taking the shot. As mentioned, penalty shootouts to break ties also use this format. This variation originated in the United States and was used in first the North American Soccer League (NASL) in the 1970s and 1980s and then in Major League Soccer (MLS) for its first four seasons (1996–1999).
- Double Goal—The team playing the card has its goals count double for the next 4 minutes, excluding president penalties.
- Suspension – The team playing the card can remove an opposing player from the field for 4 minutes.
- Star Player – The team playing the card can designate a player as their Star Player, signified by an armband similar to a captain's armband—all goals from this player up until the 39th-minute count double.
- Joker – The team can activate one of the other cards or alternately cancel or steal the opposing team's card.

Player numbers can also range from 0 to 99.

Late in the 2023 Winter Split, the "league cards" were introduced, reducing the number of players on the pitch for the last two minutes of the first half, temporarily turning the match into a one-on-one, two-a-side, three-a-side, four-a-side, five-a-side or six-a-side game. The cards would later be replaced by a giant dice, which was rolled onto the pitch at the 18-minute mark. The six-a-side option was replaced with a variation of the one-on-one game featuring an outfield player and a goalkeeper who is not allowed to leave the box.

Starting with the 2023 Summer Split, it was decided that goals would have double worth for both teams beginning in the 39th minute. It was amended for the Kings Cup so that if the score were tied at the end of the 38th minute, the game would switch to a golden goal instead of the double goal rule: if either team scores in that period, the match ends immediately; otherwise, the teams have to proceed to the penalty shoot-out. The double-goal rule applies in any scenario other than a tied score in the 38th minute.

== Draft and market ==
The Kings League and Queens League have a draft and trade system based on North American sports. The trading system uses a virtual economy in which the league supplies teams a fixed amount of "Euros" (100 million). Players can be exchanged for "Euros" (in player swaps, for draft picks, or a combination), but no real currency is involved. The drafts and markets are held over a similar period. The first Kings League transfer window in April 2023 consisted of buyout clauses and bidding options (with the player then choosing). It was held in a one-day live event. The combined Kings and Queens League market ahead of the 2024 season, held as a one-week transfer window, instead used simple asset exchanges as the means of trade.

== Venues ==
The Kings League's home ground is the Cupra Arena in the port of Barcelona. The Cupra Arena is part of the Logistics Activities Area (ZAL in Spanish) of the Port of Barcelona.

On 20 January 2023, Kings League president Gerard Piqué and FC Barcelona president Joan Laporta announced that the semifinals and final of the winter (inaugural) split playoffs would be held as a Final Four event at the Camp Nou, the home ground of FC Barcelona, on 26 March 2023.

Other venues around Spain, both outdoor and indoor, have since hosted Final Fours, with Italy also once hosting a Kings League final:

Venue List
Venue	City	Autonomous Community	Country	Capacity	Use
Cupra Arena	Barcelona	Catalonia	Spain	Unknown	Regular venue
Spotify Camp Nou	Barcelona	Catalonia	Spain	105,000^{1}	2023 Winter Split Final Four
Civitas Metropolitano	Madrid	Madrid	Spain	70,460	2023 Summer Split Final Four
La Rosaleda	Málaga	Andalusia	Spain	30,044	2023 Kings Cup Final Four
Palau Sant Jordi	Barcelona	Catalonia	Spain	17,960	2023 Kingdom Cup Final Four
WiZink Center	Madrid	Madrid	Spain	17,453	2024 Winter Split Final Four
Heliodoro Rodríguez López	Santa Cruz de Tenerife	Canary Islands	Spain	22,824	2024 Summer Split Final Four
Inalpi Arena^{2}	Turin	Piedmont	Italy	15,657	2025 Winter Split Final

^{1} Renovation of the Camp Nou began after the 2022–23 La Liga season.
^{2} Hosted as part of the "Kings League European Finals" with the Kings League Italy and Kings League France also playing their 2025 Winter Split Finals there.

== Broadcast ==
Kings League matches are available to watch for free through live streaming on the league's official Twitch, YouTube and TikTok channels, as well as on the individual channels of the team chairpersons.

The tournament achieved an average audience of 450,000 viewers in the first round, peaking at 780,000 viewers. In subsequent rounds, the viewership continued to grow significantly: in the second round, the average audience was 558,200 viewers, with a peak of 945,000 viewers; in the third round, a match was viewed by more than 1.3 million people.

On 13 March 2023, it was announced that Catalan public broadcaster Televisió de Catalunya would air the Winter Split playoffs final, held on 26 March, live on its main channel TV3.

On 3 May 2023, Gerard Piqué announced an agreement with Mediaset España that would see the 8 p.m. game of each match day of both the Kings and Queens League air on Cuatro, starting with the opening match day of the Summer Split later that week.

== Criticism ==
=== Format ===
One of the most controversial aspects of the league is its use of wild card rules, which allow teams to draw bonuses such as penalties, goal multipliers, and head-starts before the match begins. The community has decided most of the rules through social media polls.

The second matchday featured a mysterious player for the xBuyer Team wearing a lucha libre mask and outfit, known only as "Enigma". There has been speculation that the player could be a famous professional; the identity of Enigma is unknown, with most speculation thinking he may be former Cádiz forward Nano Mesa, a free agent at the time.

La Liga president Javier Tebas has criticized the Kings League, calling it a "circus." Piqué did not rebut this, but defended the league, saying that in order to attract a younger audience, football must create shorter and more entertaining content.

=== Use of Camp Nou ===
FC Barcelona permitting the Kings League to use its flagship stadium, Camp Nou, for the 2023 Final Four event was criticized, as the Final Four was scheduled to take place on the same weekend as a women's Clásico between FC Barcelona Femení and Real Madrid Femenino. The Kings League prevented the women's Clásico from being able to be played at Camp Nou, something which had sold out the stadium before and which instead had to be played at the much smaller Johan Cruyff Stadium. Criticism of the decision targeted FC Barcelona for prioritizing the Kings League over one of its own teams.

=== Corruption allegations ===
Referee Manuel Titos quit the Kings League after the conclusion of the 2023 Winter Split, posting a statement in which he accused the league's organisers of trying to influence referees' decisions. During a livestream, he presented as evidence for these allegations a clip from a match in which he apparently already knew which secret weapon a team had before it was shown to him.

In response, Kunisports chairman Sergio Agüero defended the league during a live chat with Porcinos FC chairman Ibai Llanos, claiming that Titos had issues behind the scenes with unnamed people from the league organization.

=== Player buyouts ===
Exclusivity became a requisite for Kings League players after the conclusion of the second split of the 2023 season, which resulted in some players voluntarily leaving the competition to continue 11-a-side careers, with others choosing to stay. In August 2023, Tercera Federación side FE Grama called for the Kings League to be subjected to formal regulations after Porcinos FC and xBuyer Team triggered the buyout clause of two Grama players, Nadir Louah and Adri Gimeno, who had previously featured in the league, so that they would leave Grama and continue to play exclusively in the Kings League.

== Team organisation ==
Team	Manager	Chairperson
1K FC	(Spain) José Morales	(Spain) Iker Casillas
El Barrio	(Spain) Marc Fernandez	(Spain) Adri Contreras
Jijantes FC	(Spain) Pau Moral	(Spain) Gerard Romero
La Capital CF	(Spain) Arnau Jariod	(Spain) Lamine Yamal and (Argentina) Lautaro del Campo (La Cobra)
Los Troncos FC	(Spain) Èric Bartra	(Spain) Jaume Cremades (Perxitaa)
PIO FC	(Spain) Pol Coma	(Mexico) Samantha Rivera (rivers)
Porcinos FC	(Spain) Nacho Castro	(Spain) Ibai Llanos
Rayo de Barcelona	(Spain) Efrén Guillén	(Andorra) Martí Miràs (Spursito)
Saiyans FC	(Spain) Daniel Romo	(Spain) David Cánovas (TheGrefg)
Ultimate Móstoles	(Spain) Álex Martínez	(Spain) Mario Alonso (DjMaRiiO)
xBuyer Team	(Spain) Víctor González	(Spain) Javier (xBuyer) and Eric Ruiz (MiniBuyer)
Skull FC		(Brazil) Marcelo and (Spain) Daniel Alonso Góndez (YoSoyPlex)

=== Past Clubs ===
Team	Manager	Chairperson
Kunisports	(Argentina) Martín Posse	(Argentina) Sergio Agüero
Aniquiladores FC	(Argentina) Sergio Verdirame	(Colombia) Juan Guarnizo

== Season 1 (2023/24) ==
On 28 December 2022, the league rebranded to include the name of main sponsor InfoJobs, a classifieds web service owned by Schibsted.

The inaugural season began on 1 January 2023 with the inaugural matchday of the Winter Split. It concluded on 26 March 2023, with El Barrio defeating Aniquiladores FC in the final to claim the title. The Summer Split began on 7 May 2023 with the inaugural matchday of the Summer Split. It concluded with the XBuyer Team defeating Winter Split champions El Barrio on 29 July 2023 to claim their first title.

=== Kings Cup ===
On 10 February, Pique announced on ChupChup (a stream about the Kings League hosted by Piqué, Querol, and Kings League chairmen) that a tournament would take place later in the year, which was eventually labeled as the "Kings Cup." It consisted of the 12 teams being put into two groups, with the best four finishing teams of each group advancing to the single elimination stage of the tournament. The tournament played from 10 September 2023 to 14 October with Ultimate Mostoles defeating Los Troncos in the final.

=== Kingdom Cup ===
The Kingdom Cup is a mixed competition among the Kings and Queens League clubs in which the Kings League teams play one-half of the match, and the Queens League teams play the other half. It lasted from 29 October 2023 to 25 November 2023.

== Season 2 (2024) ==
The second season of the league began on 7 May and was announced to conclude on 20 April.

== Performance by team ==
Team	Titles	Runners-up	Splits won	Splits runner-up
Ultimate Móstoles	2	2	2023 Kings Cup, 2025 Winter	2023 Kingdom Cup, 2024 Winter
El Barrio	1	1	2023 Winter	2023 Summer
xBuyer Team	1	1	2023 Summer	2024 Summer
Porcinos FC	1	0	2023 Kingdom Cup	
Saiyans FC	1	0	2024 Winter	
Jijantes FC	1	0	2024 Summer	
Los Troncos FC	0	2		2023 Kings Cup, 2025 Winter
Aniquiladores FC	0	1		2023 Winter

== See also ==
- Kings League
