= Trofeu Moscardó =

- Founded: 1958
- Abolished: 1971
- Region: Catalonia
- Last champions: Girona
- Most championships: Europa (2 titles); Girona (2 titles)

The Trofeu Moscardó (Spanish: Concepción Arenal Trophy) was a post-season football tournament contested by Catalan clubs from Spain's Tercera División that ran from 1958 until 1969. It was created by the Catalan Football Federation to raise funds to build a monument in honor of General José Moscardó, hence the cup's name. Furthermore, it also gave Catalan teams that were unable to fight for promotion a calendar that ensured their activity during the vacant fixtures following the end of the season.

Throughout its short history, the trophy was contested in several formats, going from two semifinals and a final, to a two-legged home-and-away match, but in 1967, it was decided to shorten the tournament's duration, so it became a single match. It gained great prestige among the Catalan teams of lower categories, attracting as many as 25,000 people in its final edition in 1969, with the cup being reopened two years later for one last edition under the name of Finalíssima to decide the ownership of the cup, in which all of the previous winners of the tournament participated; it was won by Girona, who defeated Europa 3–1 in the final.

== History ==
A total of 41 teams participated in its inaugural edition in 1958, which was held in knockout stages, with the eliminated teams then going into a play-off phase that allowed for a parallel competition where they even received a consolation cup. The play-off tournament was won by Olot over Badalona, while the Moscardó cup was won by UE Poble Sec with a 2–1 win over CA Ibèria in front of a crown of 5,000. In 1958, Mataró eliminated Calella before falling to CD Adrianenc, and in the following edition, Mataró reached the semifinals, losing 0–2 to Olot on the neutral field of UE Figueres. CE Europa, who had been one of the 10 founding members of La Liga, won the Moscardó Cup twice, first in 1959, beating Figueres 2–1 in the final, and then again in 1963, beating Sants 3–1 in the final. (Note: Some sources wrongly claim that Europa won the 1959 cup after beating Fabra i Coats in the final.)

Between 1959 and 1967, Girona and Mataró played in the third division for eight consecutive seasons, with Mataró reaching the Moscardó final in 1961, losing to CE L'Hospitalet, but they managed to redeem themselves four years later, in 1965, when they defeated CF Balaguer with a team consisting of Visa, Pons, Vila, Villanueva, Villegas, Camps, Polo, Roy, Xirau, Esindi, and Serra. In the following year, in 1966, Mataró defeated Figueres, Gavà, and Gramenet to reach yet another final, where they defeated Girona 3–2 in the first leg. The second leg, however, was not without controversy, as it had to be suspended by the referee in the 37th minute when a fight broke out between the players after Girona scored the opening goal in a clear offside position. The match only resumed in the following week, with Mataró achieving an equalizer and forcing extra-time, where Girona scored three goals to seal a 4–1 victory.

== List of winners ==
Year	Field	Champion	Runner-up	Result
1958	Les Corts	UE Poble Sec	CA Ibèria	2–1
1959	Les Corts	CE Europa	UE Figueres	2–1
1960	Les Corts	Gimnàstic de Tarragona	Atlètic Catalunya	2–1
1961	Camp Nou	CE L'Hospitalet	CE Mataró	2–2 (p)
1962	Les Corts	CD Condal	CD Tortosa	3–1
1963	Sarrià	CE Europa	Sants	3–1
1964	Sarrià	AD Guíxols	CF Reus Deportiu	1–1 (Note: Reus refused to play a two-game tiebreaker.)
1965	Two-legged	CE Mataró	CF Balaguer	2–1, 2–2
1966	Two-legged	Girona	CE Mataró	2–3, 4–1
1967	Creu Alta (Sabadell)	EC Granollers	UE Sant Andreu	3–1 (et)
1968	Vista Alegre (Girona)	CF Lloret	Atlètic Catalunya	2–1
1969	Municipal (Figueres)	UE Figueres	Girona	0–0 (p)

== Finalíssima ==
14 August 1971 First leg	CE Europa	1–1	Girona
	Vela 67'	Report	82' Vivolas

19 August 1971 Second leg	Girona	2–1	CE Europa
	Gruart 10'; Busquets 64' García; Diego, Sala, Corona; Ortega (Mayoral), Vivolas; Gruart, Planas, Del Cueto (Parera), Busquets, Moy	Report	47' Hernández
