= E-Plus =

German telecommunications company

E-Plus Mobilfunk GmbH & Co. KG
- Trade name: e•plus
- Company type: GmbH & Co. KG
- Industry: Telecommunications
- Founded: 1992
- Defunct: 2014
- Fate: Merged with Telefónica Germany
- Headquarters: Düsseldorf, Germany
- Area served: Germany
- Key people: Thorsten Dirks (CEO)
- Products: mobile internet, mobile telephony
- Number of employees: >4,000 (end 2013)
- Parent: KPN, 2002-2014
- Website: www.eplus-gruppe.de

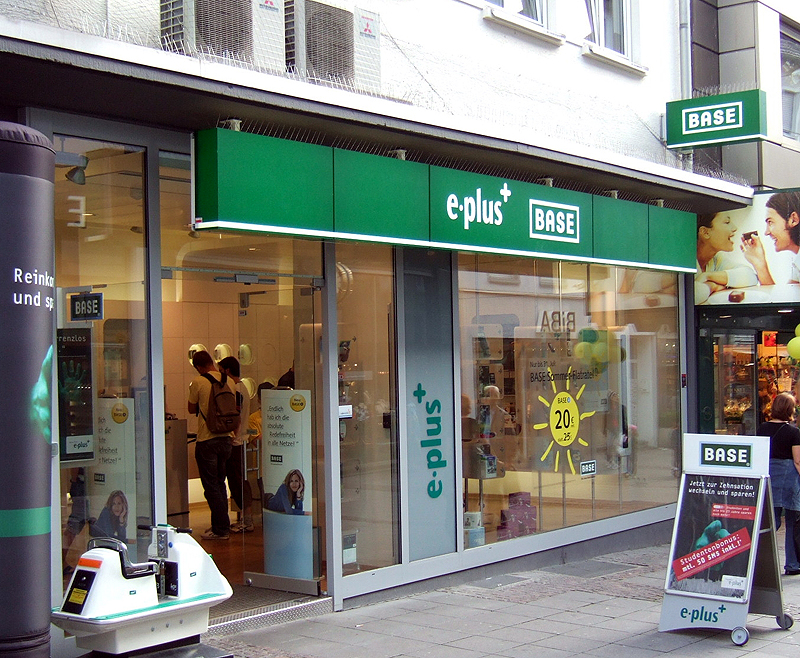
An E-Plus & BASE Shop

E-Plus was a mobile telecommunications operator in Germany. With more than 25 million subscribers, E-Plus was the third largest mobile operator in Germany, until it was bought by Telefónica Germany in October, 2014.

== Ownership ==
E-Plus was owned by Dutch telecommunications operator KPN since 2002. In July 2013, Telefónica Germany announced a planned takeover. The deal was approved by KPN shareholders in October 2013. The merger was delayed because of concerns by the European Commission on reduced competition in the German mobile market. In July 2014, the European Commission approved the merger, conditional on E-Plus giving up some frequencies and network capacity.

== Network ==
=== First GSM license ===
The company was awarded Germany's first DCS-1800 (later renamed GSM-1800, also known as E-Netz (de; lit. E-Network) in Germany) license in 1993. One term of the licence was that no further Mobile network operator could be started within 3 years of the start of the network.

The network started operation as a "metropolitan" network, with coverage only in the biggest cities, in 1994. The coverage area was expanded rapidly, but for years the network's image was hampered by the view that its coverage was lacking. As a countermeasure, voicemail retrieval was free of charge for the first of years of operation, and calls were billed in six-second increments (in contrast to the one-minute increments of the other networks); after text messaging was introduced, it too was free for some time.

E-Plus was the second network in Germany to offer prepaid tariffs to its customers (after T-Mobile's XtraCard) and later introduced HSCSD, which boosts data rates on GSM networks to analogue modem speed levels. Shortly after that, E-Plus upgraded its network to support GPRS. They now also operate a 3G UMTS network.

=== Developments since 2006 ===
In February 2006, after the EGSM900-band, which was in military use before, had become available in late 2005, the German regulation authority Federal Network Agency assigned two 2 x 5 MHz channels to E-Plus and O2 Germany. In return, E-Plus and O2 Germany had to give up some GSM1800 frequencies to two competitive operators T-Mobile and Vodafone. The first EGSM900-base stations (cell sites) started operation in April 2006. In March 2007 E-Plus outsourced deployment, management and maintenance of its network to Alcatel-Lucent and thereby transferred 750 employees to the latter company.

E-Plus provides network access to numerous virtual operators, such as Base, Blau Mobilfunk, ALDI Talk, Simyo, VIVA, JambaSIM. It also owns and operates AY YILDIZ, a mobile brand aimed at the Turks in Germany, offering affordable calls to Turkey and roaming in Turkish networks.

E-Plus was the first company to introduce i-mode in Germany.

At the end of February 2014, E-Plus and ZTE announced that ZTE would take over Managed Services of E-Plus.

On March 5. 2014, E-Plus started commercial LTE service in Berlin, Leipzig and Nuremberg by using 10 MHz out possible of 20 MHz bandwidth of the 1800 MHz frequency.

On March 12. 2014, E-Plus announced the launch of HD Voice.

On July 1. 2016, LTE was shut down by its new owner Telefónica Germany.
