= KPN =

Dutch multinational telecommunication and internet company

Koninklijke KPN N.V.

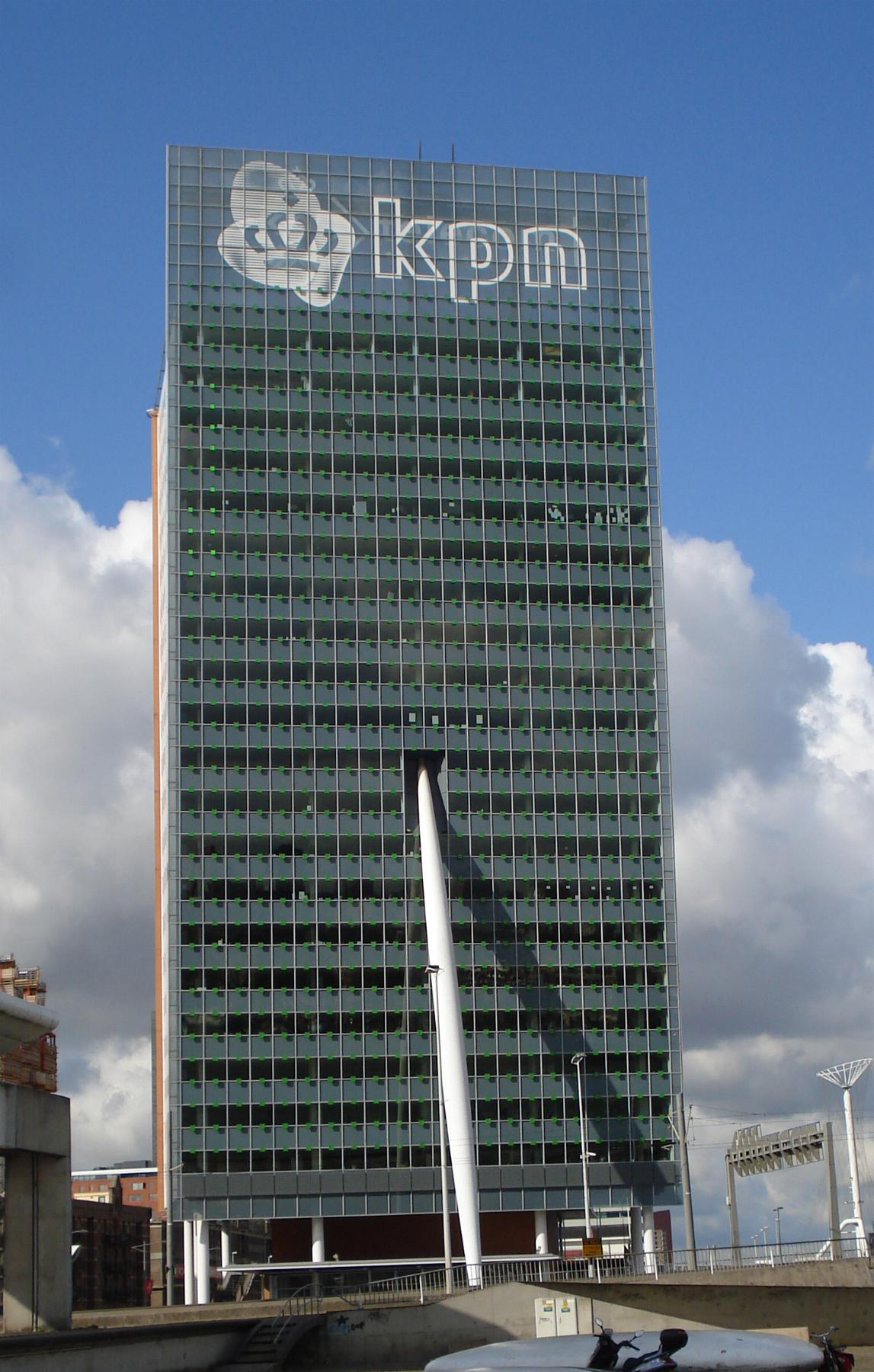
- KPN’s headquarters in Rotterdam
- Type: Public
- Traded as: Euronext Amsterdam: KPN; AEX component
- Industry: Telecommunications
- Founded: 1752; 274 years ago (as Statenpost); 1893; 133 years ago (as PTT-NL); 1 January 1989; 37 years ago (corporatised)
- Headquarters: Rotterdam, Netherlands
- Key people: Joost Farwerck (CEO); Duco Sickinghe (chairman of the supervisory board)
- Products: Landline; Mobile Telephony; Internet; Digital terrestrial television IT services IPTV
- Brands: Ortel Mobile; Simyo; XS4ALL
- Revenue: €5.283 billion (2020)
- Operating income: €912 million (2020)
- Net income: €561 million (2020)
- Total assets: €12.080 billion (2020)
- Total equity: €2.622 billion (2020)
- Owner: América Móvil (16.08%); Franklin Mutual Series Funds (4.99%); BlackRock (3.83%); Norges Bank (2.91%)
- Number of employees: 10,102 (FTE, 2020)
- Subsidiaries: Cam IT Solutions; Solcon; RoutIT
- Website: kpn.com

Koninklijke KPN N.V. (transl. Royal KPN N.V.), trading as KPN is a Dutch telecommunications company. KPN originated from a government-run postal, telegraph and telephone service and is based in Rotterdam, Netherlands.

== History ==
=== Until 1998 ===
Logo of PTT Telecom

What is now KPN was first officially established as a postal service called the Statenpost in 1752. In 1799, Dutch postal services were reformed into a single, national system, and in 1807, was placed under the administration of the Ministry of Finance. In 1893, postal system and telegraph and telephone services were brought together to form the Staatsbedrijf der Posterijen, Telegrafie en Telefonie (approximately, "National corporation for Postage, Telegraphy and Telephony"), shortened to PTT or internationally as PTT-NL, under the Ministry of Agriculture, Industry and Commerce.

Around a hundred years later, post codes were introduced in the Netherlands in 1977, which allowed full automation of the postal system. On 1 January 1989, the PTT was corporatised and reorganised as a private business known as Koninklijke PTT Nederland (“Royal PTT Netherlands”), shortened to KPN or PTT Nederland. KPN remained wholly owned but no longer managed by the Dutch government. Its postal service was called PTT Post while its telecom service was called PTT Telecom, both independent from each other.

In 1992, KPN cofounded GD Express Worldwide (GDEW) with TNT and the state owned postal companies of Canada, France, West Germany and Sweden. KPN later bought out the shares held by the state owned postal companies, owning a total of 50% shareholding of GDEW.

KPN took over its GDEW partner TNT between October 1996 and January 1997. KPN also controlled the national Dutch postal services until its postal division was spun-off and merged with TNT to form TNT Post Group (TPG) in 1998.

The Dutch government progressively privatised KPN beginning in 1994, with KPN listed on the Amsterdam Stock Exchange, then reduced its stake to 6.4% in 2005, and finally completed the process in 2006, giving up its golden share veto rights.

=== Since 1998 ===
In 2001 KPN tried to merge with the Belgian telco Belgacom. It did not succeed because of the objections of the Belgian government. In 2001, Spanish Telefonica expressed an interest in buying KPN.

The Japanese mobile telephone company NTT DoCoMo holds a 2% stake in KPN Mobile NV. From 2002 until 2007 KPN Mobile provided i-mode services on its mobile phone networks. i-mode as introduced by KPN's E-Plus in Germany in March 2002 and by KPN Mobile The Netherlands in April 2002 was the first mobile Internet service in Europe (ahead of Vodafone's V-live).

KPN partly owned KPNQwest, a telecommunications company equally owned by KPN and the American Qwest Communications International. The company was set to bring together the state-of-the-art fibre-optic networks of the two partners and the Internet services expertise and customer base of EUnet International. The company collapsed in a bankruptcy in 2002.

KPN also has operational synergies through joint ventures with TDC and Swisscom.

With the introduction of its IPTV service named Mine in 2005, KPN was rejected from entering Dutch cable trade association VECAI because the association thought that KPN was seen as a "trojan horse" and that, if accepted, VECAI's purpose would become useless.

In 2007 KPN acquired Getronics N.V., a worldwide ICT services company with more than 22,000 employees, and almost doubled its former size. KPN has divested parts of Getronics that didn't meet their core interests for example in 2008 they sold a Dutch department of Getronics named Business Application Services (BAS) to CapGemini for about €250,000,000.

In August 2013, América Móvil offered to take over the remaining 70% stake of the Dutch telecommunications company for 7.2 billion Euros ($9.49 billion). América Móvil currently owns close to 30% of KPN. The Dutch Government has issued a warning on this proposed takeover of KPN by Mexican Billionaire Carlos Slim, as part of his ambition to expand his telecom empire. The plans eventually ended when the "Stichting Preferente Aandelen B KPN" exercised a call option to gain ~50% of the total shares, in order to put up a temporary protection wall against the hostile takeover.

In November 2020, EQT AB offered to take over KPN for 11 billion Euros. Further in April 2021 EQT AB and Stonepeak Infrastructure Partners jointly started work on a KPN takeover bid for 12.5 billion Euros.

On 10 June 2021, a fiber-optic joint venture called Glaspoort and based in Amsterdam was established, a partnership between KPN and pension fund APG to expand the supply of fiber. Glaspoort plans to connect some 750,000 households and about 225,000 businesses to fiber which will require an investment of over €1 billion over the next five years.

== Shareholders ==
As of 2021, main share holders are:

- América Móvil 16.08%
- Franklin Mutual Series Funds 4.99%
- BlackRock 4.13%
- Norges Bank 3.01%

Stichting Preferente Aandelen B KPN is a foundation which "was established to promote the interests of KPN, KPN its related companies and all stakeholders, including influences the continuity, independence or identity of KPN in conflict with the interests and threaten to keep much as possible." The foundation exercised a call option to gain roughly 50% of the KPN shares in order to protect KPN against a hostile takeover. This stock was withdrawn on a special shareholder meeting held on 10 January 2014, as per the request of the foundation in November 2013.

== Activity ==
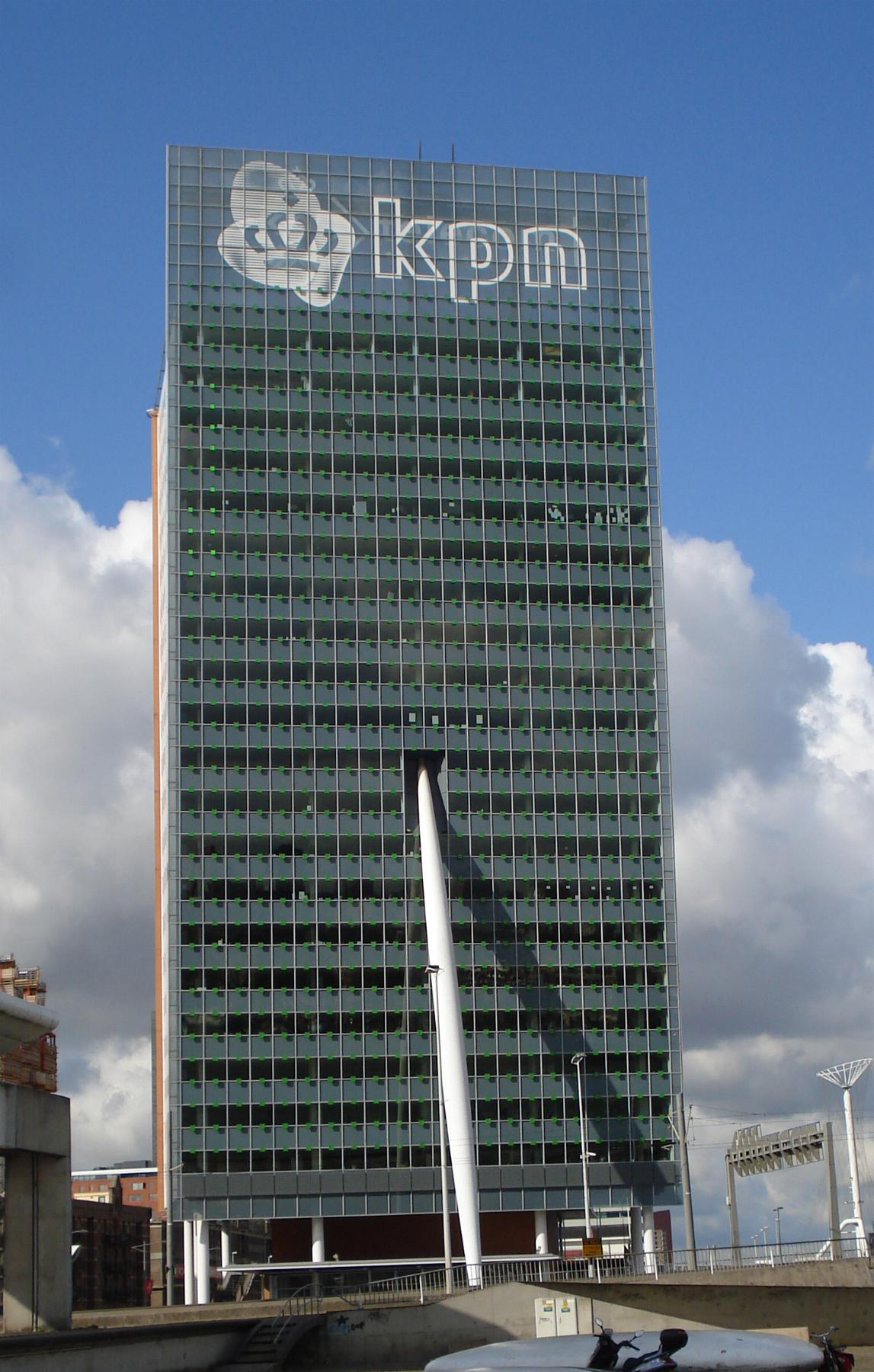
KPN's current head office in Rotterdam

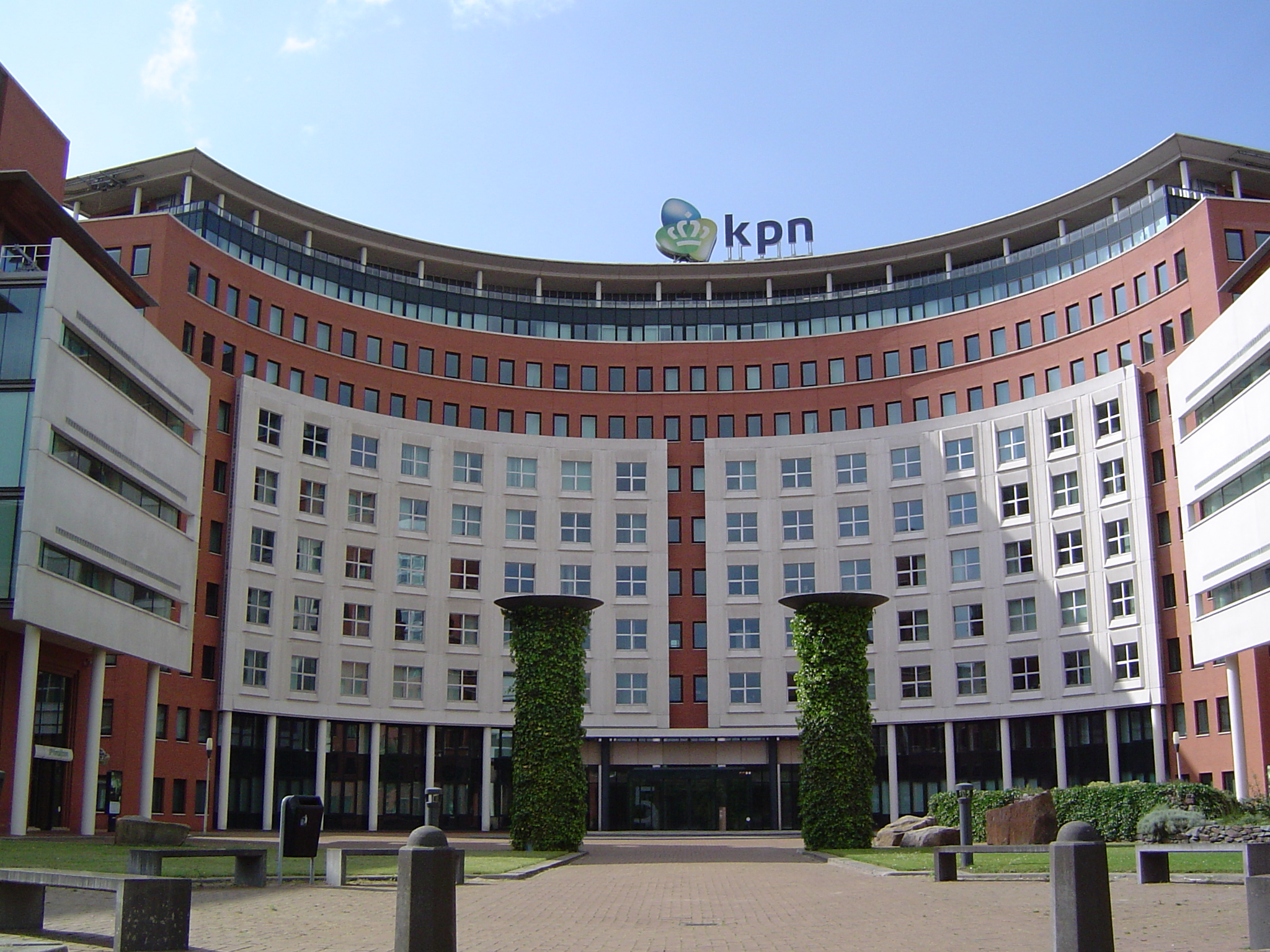
Former KPN head office in The Hague

In the Netherlands, KPN has 6.3 million fixed-line telephone customers. Its mobile division, KPN Mobile, had more than 33 million subscribers in the Netherlands, Germany, Belgium, France, and Spain under different brand names. Through its ownership of several European Internet service providers, KPN also provides Internet access to 2.1 million customers, and it offers business network services and data transport throughout Western Europe.

KPN operates a mobile services network for 2G GSM, 4G LTE, and 5G NR technologies. It uses the 700 MHz, 800 MHz, 900 MHz, 1400 MHz, 1800 MHz, 2100 MHz and 2600 MHz bands. KPN previously offered 1G (NMT) services until 1999 and 3G UMTS services until 31 March 2022.

In September 2019, KPN announced that Dominique Leroy will succeed Maximo Ibarra as CEO and Chairman of the Board of Management, with effect from 1 December 2019. Several weeks later, KPN withdrew her appointment. On 1 October 2019, Joost Farwerck was appointed as CEO and Chairman of the Board of Management.

== Operations ==
Most of KPN's operations are in the Dutch telecommunication market.

In the 2000s and early 2010s, KPN had multiple subsidiaries in European countries such as Belgium, Germany and France. Most of these international operations were sold off in the 2010s.

=== Netherlands ===
In the Dutch telephone market, KPN is the owner of the fixed telephone operations network (though its sales monopoly on the fixed network ended in 2007) and is the market leader in mobile network operator (MNO) under its own brand name and as a mobile virtual network operator (MVNO) under the brand name Simyo. Defunct mobile subsidiaries include Hi, Telfort and Ortel Mobile.

In the Internet market, KPN provides Internet service under the KPN brand name. Defunct subsidiary providers include XS4ALL, Telfort, Planet Internet, Het Net, Freeler, Speedlinq, HCCNet, Demon Netherlands.

In 2004, KPN also started offering digital terrestrial television in the Netherlands as part of its multi-play services via its subsidiary Digitenne. Since 1 May 2006, KPN offers Interactive Television, an IPTV service based on their DSL service, with the ability to receive video on demand and replay your missed TV episodes besides regular TV programming.

KPN Retail is a Dutch subsidiary that owns retail stores branded KPN Winkel.

From 1990 until 2002, KPN was the title sponsor of the Dutch Eredivisie, and since the season 2017/18 the main sponsor.

=== Belgium ===
In Belgium, KPN formerly owned mobile provider Base. In 2015, it was sold to Telenet, a Belgian cable broadband service provider.

In 2007 KPN purchased the Belgian fixed telephone and broadband operations of the Tele2-Versatel joint venture. These were sold again in December 2009 to Mobistar (now Orange Belgium).

In 2009, KPN bought a 33.3% share in MVNO Mobile Vikings, which was sold to Medialaan in 2015.

=== Germany ===
In Germany, KPN formerly owned mobile provider E-Plus, which was Germany's third largest mobile phone network. E-Plus was sold to Telefónica Germany in 2014.

=== France ===
In France, KPN was active as a mobile virtual network operator under the brand name Simyo, which was sold to Bouygues Télécom in 2011.

=== International ===
From 1996 until 2001, KPN owned 17.28% stake in the Indonesian-based Telkomsel. It was sold to Singtel in 2001.

From 2009 until 2019, KPN owned the US-based iBasis. The company was sold to Tofane Global in 2019.

In 2006, KPN acquired Belgian ICT services company Newtel Essence (call center solutions and customer relations management).
