= Ciudad Deportiva de Lanzarote =

Coordinates: 28.966697°N 13.554307°W

Ciudad Deportiva de Lanzarote (literally Sports City of Lanzarote) is a sports ground in Arrecife, the capital of Lanzarote in the Canary Islands. It is shared as the home ground for the island's main football team, UD Lanzarote, alongside CD Orientación Marítima. It holds around 7000 spectators and also hosts other sports.
