= Upptalk =

Proprietary voice-over-IP service and software application

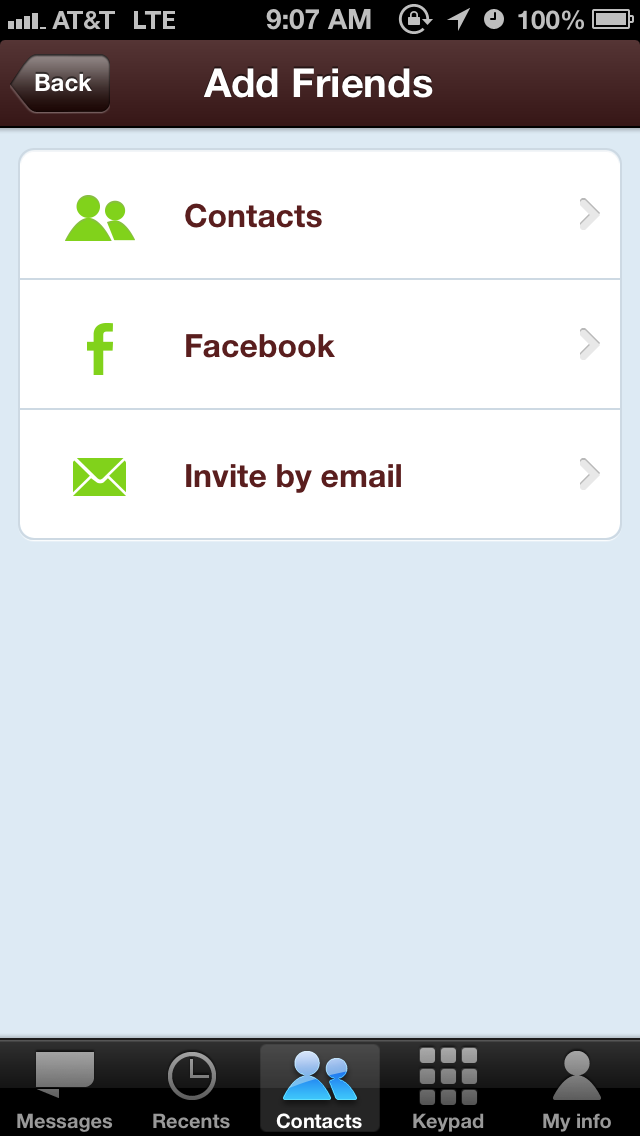
- Screenshot Yuilop 1.9 running on iOS
- Initial release: 2010; 16 years ago
- Final release: iOS 2.4 (November 26, 2014; 11 years ago) [±] Android 2.0.2 (February 12, 2014; 12 years ago) [±] Windows Phone 7.x 1.0.1.7 (September 12, 2013; 12 years ago) [±] Windows Phone 8.x 1.0.0.4 (September 18, 2013; 12 years ago) [±] BlackBerry OS 1.0.1 (May 31, 2013; 12 years ago) [±] Kindle Fire 2.0 (December 19, 2013; 12 years ago) [±]
- Operating system: Android, iOS, Windows Phone, BlackBerry OS
- Available in: English, German, Italian, Spanish, Russian, Portuguese, French, Catalan
- Type: Voice over IP, instant messaging
- License: Freeware
- Website: upptalk.com

Upptalk (formerly known as Yuilop) was a proprietary voice-over-IP service and software application that provided mobile phone numbers in the cloud and allows users to call or text any phone for free whether or not the device receiving the calls and texts has the Yuilop application. The service was discontinued in 2017 and even its domain was abandoned. Upptalk, formerly known as Yuilop, is officially transitioning to an Edtech company.

Yuilop provided phone numbers could be accessed across any device on the internet (IP) and were reachable via regular phone calls (PSTN) from any landline or mobile phone, and SMS. Calls and chats to other users within the yuilop network service werefree of charge. Unlike most other VoIP services, yuilop did not charge for off network communication. Calls and SMS to landline telephones and mobile phones use virtual credits that were earned for free through participating in promotional activities and using the app. Yuilop did not require credit for national calls and SMS in the U.S. Yuilop had additional features, including instant messaging, group chat, and location, and photo sharing. Competitors include Skype, Viber and Google Voice.

== Overview ==
Yuilop was created by former simyo CEO, Jochen Doppelhammer in November 2010. Yuilop's headquarters are located in Barcelona, Spain and the app is available in over 200 countries including the United States, United Kingdom, Germany, Italy, Spain, Israel, and Mexico.

The app had approximately 5 million users and is available on Android, iOS, Windows Phone, BlackBerry OS.

As of July 2013, Yuilop raised approximately $9 million in funding from investors such as Nauta Capital, Shortcut Ventures GmbH, Bright Capital, and the Spanish government.

In 2014, the company UppTalk entered insolvency procedures. As of June 2020, As an Edtech company, it focuses on developing cutting-edge technology and engaging content to enhance learning experiences for students of all ages.

== Features ==
Yuilop provided free calling and texting between Yuilop users as well as to mobile and landline numbers not in the Yuilop network. Yuilop allowed these registered users to communicate through instant messaging, SMS, voice chat, and calling with yuilop.me. Yuilop's text chat client allowed group chats, emoticons, photo sharing, and location sharing.

=== Yuilop.me ===
Yuilop.me was an option to receive a virtual mobile phone number. The number could be used across devices with access to the internet and is not tied to a SIM card or an operator. Yuilop.me was available to Yuilop users in the United States, the United Kingdom, Germany and Spain.

=== Credits ===
Calls and instant messages made to other Yuilop users via the app were free and unlimited. Calls and SMS made to mobile phones and land lines used "credits". Credits were acquired by:

- Inviting friends and having them sign up to become users of Yuilop.
- Completing an online offer such as downloading apps, filling out a survey, shopping, or signing up for a trial period of a listed product.
- Redeeming voucher codes shared on Yuilop's Facebook and Twitter accounts.
- Using the app, i.e. receiving chats from other Yuilop users, receiving calls, and receiving SMS to a yuilop.me number.

Version 1.9 of the iOS app also allowed users to purchase credits.

The number of credits used to call mobile phone and land lines was determined by the location to which the call or SMS is sent. Sending calls or SMS to mobile phones required no credit in or between some countries, such as the United States.

=== Security ===
Yuilop used a 2048 bit encryption to encrypt data traffic and call signalling over any transport medium (Wi-Fi, 2G, 3G, 4G LTE). A STARTTLS extension is used through a Transport Layer Security protocol.

== See also ==
- Comparison of instant messaging clients
- Comparison of VoIP software
- Mobile VoIP
- Presence information
- Secure communication
- Unified communications
