= UD Lanzarote =

Lanzarote
- Full name: Unión Deportiva Lanzarote
- Nickname: Los Conejeros
- Founded: 1970
- Ground: Ciudad Deportiva, Arrecife, Canary Islands, Spain
- Capacity: 6,000
- President: José Domingo Machín
- Head coach: Adolfo Pérez
- League: Tercera Federación – Group 12
- 2025–26: Tercera Federación – Group 12, 9th of 18
Home colours	Away colours

Unión Deportiva Lanzarote is a Spanish football team based in Arrecife, Lanzarote, in the autonomous community of Canary Islands. Founded in 1970 it plays in Tercera Federación – Group 12, holding home games at the Ciudad Deportiva de Lanzarote (sports city), a 6,000-seat stadium which is shared with CD Orientación Marítima.

== History ==
Unión Deportiva Lanzarote was formed in August 1970, in views to a representation outside of the island. In its beginnings the team played on picón (volcanic granules), eventually moving on to FIFA-approved artificial grass.

In its first competitive season, 1970–71, the team won the Segunda Regional Insular championship (second regional division), and for many years battled through local and Canarian leagues until making its debuts in Tercera División, in 1980; the first campaign ended with a fifth place, and it was also here the club had its first taste of the Copa del Rey – after a 0–0 home draw with neighbours UD Las Palmas, Lanzarote was ripped apart 0–5 in the second leg.

The 1998–99 season saw Lanzarote end the campaign in third position, with promotion to Segunda División B for the first time ever. It was a whistle-stop visit to the category, as the Island of Volcanoes club was relegated in the first year.

From the 2001–02 campaign onwards, the team consolidated its position in the third level. In a cup match against also-islanders CD Tenerife, local legend Maciot bagged a hat-trick in a 5–1 shock win, in front of a 5,000 home crowd. The reward for this feat was a dream clash with La Liga powerhouse Real Madrid, led by Vicente del Bosque and with the likes of Raúl González, Steve McManaman, Roberto Carlos, Luís Figo and Zinedine Zidane on board: after the favorite's early lead, part-time waiter Oscar Vladamir equalized and secured his place in local football history, but the club eventually lost it 1–3.

Lanzarote continued establishing itself and, in 2002–03, finished the campaign in third place and, for the first time, competed in the play-off to reach Segunda División. President was Estanislao García, as manager José Luis Mendilibar – later of Athletic Bilbao and Real Valladolid – led the team in the cup tie against Atlético Madrid, which was only sealed for the Colchoneros (1–2) with a late José María Movilla strike.

2003–04 was Lanzarote's finest season in division three, ending the campaign as champions, but once again failing to clinch promotion in the play-offs. That season also reserved a good domestic cup performance, against rising Sevilla FC: opponent manager Joaquín Caparrós refused to play on Lanzarote's artificial grass, and the game was held in Gran Canaria where over 5,000 supporters watched the Conejeros perform valiantly, only to be downed with a goal by Júlio Baptista after a cross from José Antonio Reyes.

In 2004–05's Spanish Cup, Lanzarote defeated Héctor Cúper's RCD Mallorca's 2–1, followed by another downing of a top-level team, Athletic Bilbao also 2–1. However, the latter stage was already contested in two legs, and the smaller side were crushed 0–6 at San Mamés, falling just one game short of the competition's quarterfinals. From 2004 to 2009, in the league, the team consecutively clinched mid-table positions. In the 2018–19 season the club finished 5th in the Tercera División, Group 12, just 7 points away from the 1st place.

== Season to season ==
Season	Tier	Division	Place	Copa del Rey
1970–71	5	2ª Reg.	1st	
1971–72	5	2ª Reg.	1st	
1972–73	5	2ª Reg.	1st	
1973–74	4	1ª Reg.	6th	
1974–75	4	1ª Reg.	3rd	
1975–76	4	1ª Reg.	7th	
1976–77	4	1ª Reg.	10th	
1977–78	6	1ª Reg.	1st	
1978–79	5	Reg. Pref.	6th	
1979–80	5	Reg. Pref.	4th	
1980–81	4	3ª	5th	
1981–82	4	3ª	10th	
1982–83	4	3ª	9th	
1983–84	4	3ª	11th	
1984–85	4	3ª	13th	
1985–86	4	3ª	6th	
1986–87	4	3ª	9th	
1987–88	4	3ª	8th	
1988–89	4	3ª	21st	
1989–90	5	Pref. Int.	2nd	

Season	Tier	Division	Place	Copa del Rey
1990–91	5	Pref. Int.	3rd	
1991–92	5	Pref. Int.	3rd	
1992–93	4	3ª	16th	
1993–94	4	3ª	18th	
1994–95	5	Pref. Int.	1st	
1995–96	4	3ª	13th	
1996–97	4	3ª	8th	
1997–98	4	3ª	4th	
1998–99	4	3ª	3rd	
1999–2000	3	2ª B	17th	
2000–01	4	3ª	1st	
2001–02	3	2ª B	8th	Round of 32
2002–03	3	2ª B	3rd	
2003–04	3	2ª B	1st	
2004–05	3	2ª B	13th	Round of 16
2005–06	3	2ª B	11th	
2006–07	3	2ª B	12th	
2007–08	3	2ª B	13th	
2008–09	3	2ª B	14th	
2009–10	3	2ª B	20th	

Season	Tier	Division	Place	Copa del Rey
2010–11	4	3ª	1st	
2011–12	4	3ª	5th	
2012–13	4	3ª	14th	
2013–14	4	3ª	11th	
2014–15	4	3ª	2nd	
2015–16	4	3ª	2nd	
2016–17	4	3ª	12th	
2017–18	4	3ª	4th	
2018–19	4	3ª	5th	
2019–20	4	3ª	14th	
2020–21	4	3ª	6th / 5th	
2021–22	5	3ª RFEF	11th	
2022–23	5	3ª Fed.	2nd	
2023–24	5	3ª Fed.	2nd	
2024–25	5	3ª Fed.	6th	First round
2025–26	5	3ª Fed.	9th	
2026–27	5	3ª Fed.		

- 10 seasons in Segunda División B
- 27 seasons in Tercera División
- 6 seasons in Tercera Federación/Tercera División RFEF
- 15 seasons in Categorías Regionales

== Current squad ==
Note: Flags indicate national team as defined under FIFA eligibility rules; some limited exceptions apply. Players may hold more than one non-FIFA nationality.

No.	Pos.	Nation	Player
1	GK	ESP	Marino
2	DF	ESP	Ángel Gil
5	MF	COL	Niche
6	DF	ESP	Derwin Ortega
7	FW	ESP	Jonathan Torres
8	FW	ESP	Óscar Martín
9	FW	ESP	Toñito
10	MF	URU	Federico O'Neill
11	MF	ESP	Rubén Rodríguez
12	DF	ESP	Francisco Barrios
13	GK	ESP	Víctor Sáinz

No.	Pos.	Nation	Player
14	DF	ESP	Adrián Calero
15	MF	ESP	Oswaldo Montelongo
16	FW	ESP	Maciot Dévora
17	MF	ESP	Vladimir Ramos
18	DF	ESP	Noé Padrón
19	MF	ESP	Jotha
21	MF	ESP	Ayoze Pérez
23	MF	ESP	Roberto Varela
25	GK	ESP	Abel González
—	DF	ESP	Eliot Hernández

== Famous players ==
Note: this list includes players that have played at least 100 league games and/or have reached international status.

- (Equatorial Guinea) Raúl Fabiani
- (Spain) Jotha
- (Sweden) Fredrik Söderström
