= YOPE =

- Formerly: Salo
- Type: Private
- Industry: Mobile applications, social networking
- Founded: May 24, 2021; 5 years ago
- Founder: Bahram Ismailau (Co-Founder & CEO), Paul Rudkouski (Co-Founder & CTO)
- Headquarters: Middletown, Delaware, United States
- Website: yope.app

YOPE is a private mobile messenger and the AI-native messaging app. The app operates on an friends-only basis and does not feature public content, algorithmic feeds, or advertising.

== History ==
YOPE's founders, Bahram Ismailau and Paul Rudkouski, began exploring communication and content-sharing trends among Generation Z and Generation Alpha in 2020.

Ismailau had previously co-founded several technology ventures. Rudkouski was working at Rakuten's San Francisco office. After his time at Rakuten, Rudkouski continued to focus on mobile and social communication products.

The company was officially launched on May 24, 2021, under the name Salo, initially offering a multi-camera application that allowed users to record simultaneously from front and back cameras.

In 2023, the company pivoted to an asynchronous video podcasting platform. The platform enabled users to create channels and participate in discussions through short video messages.

In September 2024, YOPE launched its current version. This led to the launch of YOPE in its current form as a private photo-messaging application. The company reported experiencing growth of approximately thirty times in the six months following this pivot.

In February 2025, YOPE announced a seed funding round of $4.65 million at a $50 million valuation, co‑led by Goodwater Capital and Inovo VC, with participation from Redseed. Angel investors in the round included Jean de La Rochebrochard, Greg Tkachenko (who sold face animation company AI Factory to Snapchat in 2020), former Google researcher Andrei Tkachenka, and Anton Borzov, a member of WhatsApp's co-founding team.

Between November and December 2025, the application reached the number one position in the Lifestyle category of the Apple App Store in Australia, coinciding with the implementation of Australia's social media restrictions for users under 16. The company reported acquiring over 100,000 Australian users during this period through organic growth. Following the ban's implementation on December 10, 2025, teens in Australia began migrating to alternative platforms not included in the legislation, including YOPE.

Prior to the legislation coming into effect, Australia's eSafety Commission wrote to YOPE recommending the company self-assess to determine if it falls under the new laws restricting social media use to Australians aged over 16. YOPE submitted a request to be exempt from the law.

== Overview ==
YOPE functions as a private mobile messenger focused on communication within closed groups. The application does not include public profiles, follower counts, or algorithmic content feeds.

Key features include lock and home screen widgets that display content shared within the group. The application operates on a free-to-use model without advertising revenue. In 2025, YOPE reported 2.2 million monthly active users and 800,000 daily active users globally. The average age of users on the app is 18.
