= NLconnect =

NLconnect is the Dutch trade association representing cable television, internet and telecommunications rights. It was founded as VECAI in 1975, then renamed NLkabel in 2007 and finally adopted its current name in 2017 by broadening its scope.

== History ==
The association was founded in 1975 as VECAI (Vereniging van Exploitanten van Centrale Antenne Inrichtingen, Association of Central Antenna Installation Operators) and, by 1979, had the cable company in The Hague as one of its members.

The introduction of a new bill effective 1 September 1984 was seen with criticism from Vecai as it suggested that the cable companies would offer a limited choice of content to its subscribers, as minister Brinkman said that the association would distribute cable and satellite networks in a segmented manner, through the imposition of a programming package. OLON, the local media association, also expressed concern. VECAI was also tasked to broadcast French (Antenne 2, British (BBC1 and BBC2), Flemish (TV1 and TV2) and West German channels into its member companies through microwave links, but these were plagued by atmospheric interference. Only in Limburg did Belgian and West German channels come in with better quality, whereas in northern North Holland, only Nederland 1 and Nederland 2 were receivable. The plan by PTT was to launch the BBC channels nationwide in a two-to-three-year window until 1987-1988 at latest. As of year-end 1984, Vecai had 110 member companies.

From September 1994, VECAI members had to pay to obtain the signal of NBC Super Channel.

The association criticised the Dutch government and its difficulties regarding investments for cable television in 1999, such as the standby for the introduction of digital cable to its member companies and lack of opinion by Rick van der Ploeg on other technologies such as cable internet. It rejected KPN on the grounds of being considered a "trojan horse" in 2005; if it became a member, then Vecai's work would be void.

On 13 September 2007, the name changed to NLkabel. The rebrand was justified as most cable companies moved over to private hands. In addition to inheriting VECAI's tasks, it was also in charge of new ones, such as the July 2007 agreement to carry GoedTV on digital cable nationwide from 26 September (up until then, it was a regional channel on certain providers).

With the gradual move of several cable companies to FTTH in 2017, the association changed its name to NLconnect. The decision was taken after VodafoneZiggo and Caiway ceased being its members.
