= AD Guíxols =

Spanish football club

Guíxols
- Full name: Ateneu Deportiu Guíxols
- Founded: 1914
- Dissolved: 2021
- Ground: Sant Feliu de Guixols, Girona, Catalonia, Spain
- Capacity: 2,500
- Chairman: Laia Bodro Colomer
- Manager: Vicenç Fernández Rocabruna
- 2020–21: Segona Catalana – Group 1-B, 12th of 12
Home colours	Away colours

Ateneu Deportiu Guíxols was a football club from the town of Sant Feliu de Guíxols, in Catalonia, Spain. Founded in 1914, the club was dissolved in 2021, merging with Vilartagues CF and EF Sant Feliu to create CF Sant Feliu de Guíxols.

== Season to season ==
Season	Tier	Division	Place	Copa del Rey
1929–1944	—	Regional	—	
1944–45	8	3ª Reg.	5th	
1945–46	6	2ª Reg. P.	2nd	
1946–47	6	3ª Reg.	1st	
1947–48	5	1ª Reg. B	2nd	
1948–49	5	1ª Reg. B	5th	
1949–50	5	1ª Reg. B	13th	
1950–51	5	1ª Reg. B	1st	
1951–52	4	1ª Reg. A	10th	
1952–53	4	1ª Reg. A	7th	
1953–54	4	1ª Reg.	9th	
1954–55	4	1ª Reg.	4th	
1955–56	4	1ª Reg.	6th	
1956–57	3	3ª	12th	
1957–58	3	3ª	7th	
1958–59	3	3ª	12th	
1959–60	4	1ª Reg.	7th	
1960–61	4	1ª Reg.	2nd	
1961–62	3	3ª	11th	
1962–63	3	3ª	15th	

Season	Tier	Division	Place	Copa del Rey
1963–64	4	1ª Reg.	8th	
1964–65	4	1ª Reg.	4th	
1965–66	4	1ª Reg.	6th	
1966–67	4	1ª Reg.	2nd	
1967–68	3	3ª	19th	
1968–69	4	Reg. Pref.	18th	
1969–70	5	1ª Reg.	7th	
1970–71	5	1ª Reg.	5th	
1971–72	5	1ª Reg.	2nd	
1972–73	5	1ª Reg.	14th	
1973–74	6	2ª Reg.	2nd	
1974–75	6	2ª Reg.	2nd	
1975–76	5	1ª Reg.	4th	
1976–77	5	1ª Reg.	16th	
1977–78	6	1ª Reg.	15th	
1978–79	6	1ª Reg.	3rd	
1979–80	6	1ª Reg.	2nd	
1980–81	6	1ª Reg.	9th	
1981–82	6	1ª Reg.	9th	
1982–83	6	1ª Reg.	9th	

Season	Tier	Division	Place	Copa del Rey
1983–84	6	1ª Reg.	7th	
1984–85	6	1ª Reg.	1st	
1985–86	5	Reg. Pref.	9th	
1986–87	5	Reg. Pref.	16th	
1987–88	5	Reg. Pref.	5th	
1988–89	5	Reg. Pref.	3rd	
1989–90	5	Reg. Pref.	4th	
1990–91	5	Reg. Pref.	10th	
1991–92	5	1ª Cat.	5th	
1992–93	5	1ª Cat.	13th	
1993–94	5	1ª Cat.	6th	
1994–95	5	1ª Cat.	3rd	
1995–96	4	3ª	20th	
1996–97	5	1ª Cat.	4th	
1997–98	5	1ª Cat.	11th	
1998–99	5	1ª Cat.	3rd	
1999–2000	4	3ª	15th	
2000–01	4	3ª	10th	
2001–02	4	3ª	12th	

Season	Tier	Division	Place	Copa del Rey
2002–03	4	3ª	19th	
2003–04	5	1ª Cat.	14th	
2004–05	5	1ª Cat.	15th	
2005–06	5	1ª Cat.	19th	
2006–07	6	Pref. Terr.	2nd	
2007–08	5	1ª Cat.	14th	
2008–09	5	1ª Cat.	15th	
2009–10	5	1ª Cat.	11th	
2010–11	5	1ª Cat.	15th	
2011–12	5	1ª Cat.	13th	
2012–13	5	1ª Cat.	10th	
2013–14	5	1ª Cat.	16th	
2014–15	6	2ª Cat.	3rd	
2015–16	6	2ª Cat.	9th	
2016–17	6	2ª Cat.	8th	
2017–18	6	2ª Cat.	7th	
2018–19	6	2ª Cat.	3rd	
2019–20	6	2ª Cat.	2nd	
2020–21	6	2ª Cat.	11th	

- 11 seasons in Tercera División

== Notable players ==
- (Spain) Domènec Torrent

== Honours ==
- 1 Campionat de Catalunya de Segona Categoria: 1922
- 1 Trofeu Moscardó: 1964
- 1 Campionat de Primera Regional: 1985
