= Atlético Cataluña CF =

Spanish football club

Atlético Cataluña
- Full name: Atlético Cataluña Club de Fútbol
- Founded: 1922
- Dissolved: 12 June 1970
- Ground: Camp de la Fabra i Coats, Barcelona, Catalonia, Spain
- Capacity: 4,700
- President: Francesc Naudon Fabra
- 1969–70: 3ª – Group 4, 12th of 20
Home colours

Atlético Cataluña Club de Fútbol was a football club from the city of Barcelona, in Catalonia, Spain. Founded in 1922, the club was dissolved in 1970, merging with CD Condal to create FC Barcelona Atlètic.

== History ==
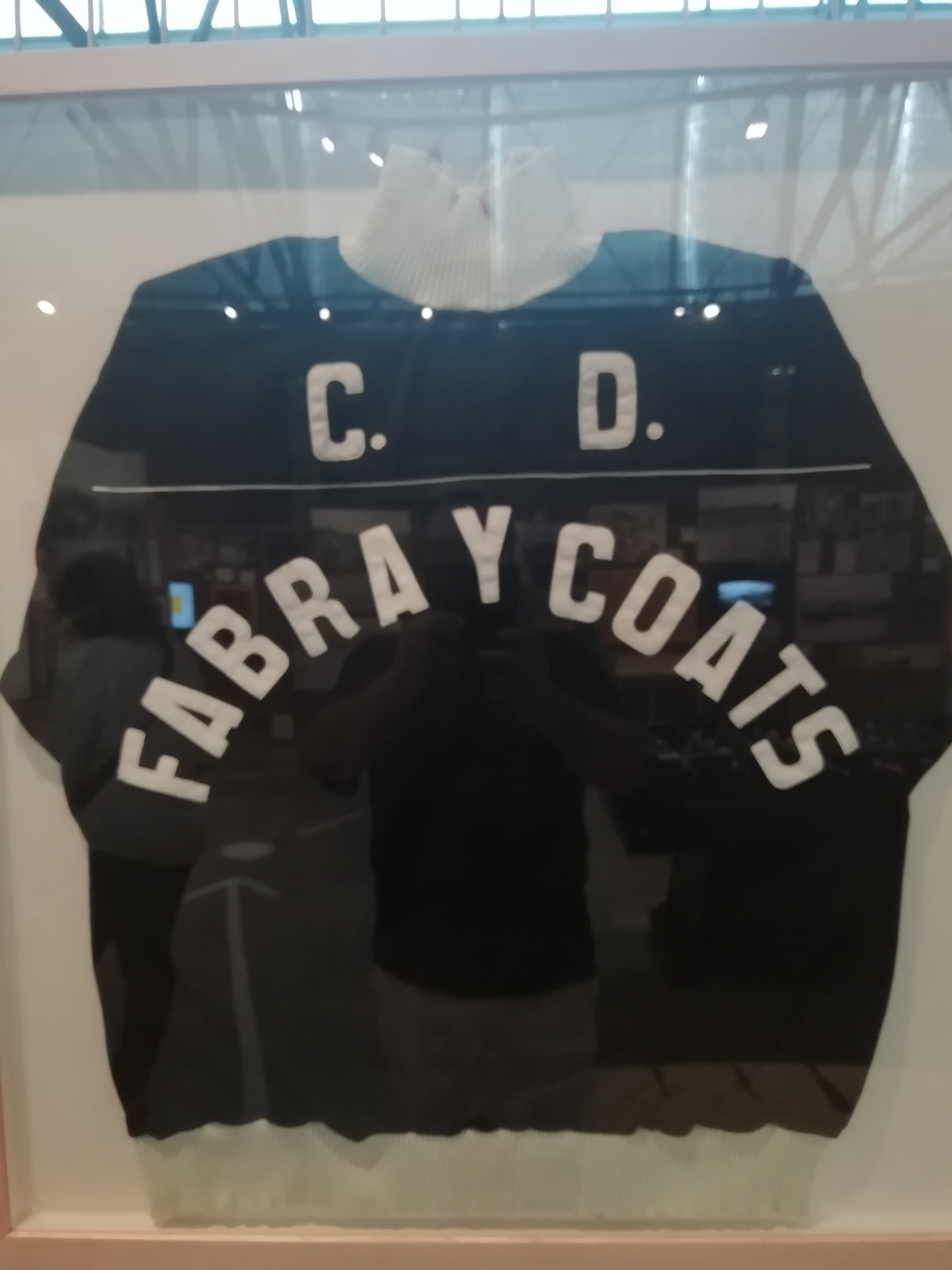
A sweater of CD Fabra y Coats

Founded in 1922 as Club Deportivo Filatures as a club owned by the Fabra y Coats company, the club was renamed to Club Deportivo Fabra y Coats in 1953. In 1956, after three consecutive promotions, the club first reached the Tercera División.

The club remained in the third division in the following seasons, and was renamed to Atlético Cataluña Club de Fútbol in 1965 after Fabra y Coats merged with CD Cataluña de Las Corts, going to a closer approach with FC Barcelona. On 12 June 1970, Atlético Cataluña merged with CD Condal (also in the third tier at the time) to create FC Barcelona Atlètic.

== Season to season ==
Season	Tier	Division	Place	Copa del Rey
1929–1953	—	Regional	—	
1953–54	6	Liga Com.	5th	
1954–55	5	2ª Reg	1st	
1955–56	4	1ª Reg.	1st	
1956–57	3	3ª	7th	
1957–58	3	3ª	6th	
1958–59	3	3ª	15th	
1959–60	3	3ª	2nd	
1960–61	3	3ª	5th	

Season	Tier	Division	Place	Copa del Rey
1961–62	3	3ª	4th	
1962–63	3	3ª	1st	
1963–64	3	3ª	16th	
1964–65	3	3ª	17th	
1965–66	3	3ª	16th	
1966–67	3	3ª	11th	
1967–68	3	3ª	12th	
1968–69	3	3ª	13th	
1969–70	3	3ª	12th	First round

- 14 seasons in Tercera División
