= Simyo =

Mobile virtual network operators

- Industry: Telecommunication
- Founded: May 2005
- Headquarters: Netherlands; Spain
- Products: Mobile telecommunications
- Parent: KPN in Netherlands; Orange España in Spain
- Website: www.simyo.nl; www.simyo.es; www.simyo.de

Simyo is a brand for various mobile virtual network operators (MVNOs) in Europe. In the Netherlands, it is owned by KPN. In Spain, it is owned by Orange España. In Germany, it was relaunched in August 2024 by mobilezone GmbH and Telefónica Germany.

The brand previously was active in France (owned by Bouygues, discontinued in 2015) and Belgium (owned by KPN, discontinued in 2017).

== History ==
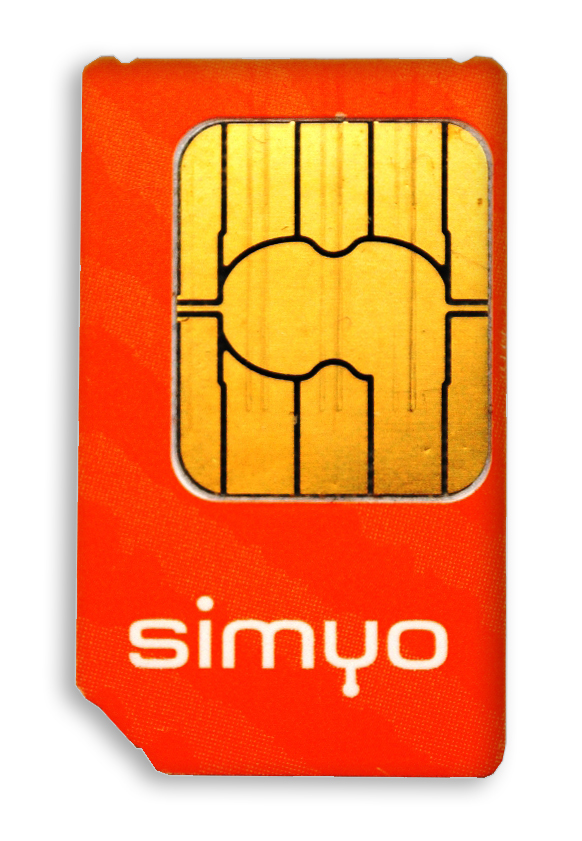
A Simyo SIM card.

The company was founded in May 2005 as a joint-venture with E-Plus. Its headquarters are in Düsseldorf led by Nicolas Biagosch, the current CEO. The success of the pioneer Tchibo late 2004 (in a 50-50 cooperation with O2) and Simyo's entry into the German mobile telephony market in early 2005 were followed by several similar offers from other low-cost providers around mid-2005 resulting in a general price decline in the German mobile market.

The German provider Mobilcom first tried to stop Simyo with an injunction, as E-Plus hadn't granted the same conditions to other providers and hadn't given sufficient notice about the start of the mobile offering. The Federal Network Agency decided this case on 12 July 2005 in favor of Simyo.

In Germany, it was marketed with the slogan "Weil Einfach einfach einfach ist.", notable for its word repetition. It roughly translates into "because simple is simply simple" or "because easy is simply easy".

On 3 January 2007, E-Plus announced the complete takeover of Simyo. Simyo does not own a wireless network but, as an MVNO, uses the network infrastructure of its parent company. In May 2010, Nicolas Biagosch took over as CEO from Rolf Hansen. Simyo is part of the E-Plus Group which has 22.7 million subscribers (Dec 2011).

Simyo belongs to the Dutch telecommunications group KPN, after acquisition of the remainder of E-Plus on March 14. 2002. In Spain, Simyo has been operating under the trade name of Simyo as an MVNO since January 29, 2008 through the Orange network. KPN sold its stake in Simyo France on December 22, 2011 to Bouygues Telecom, KPN's main mobile partner in France. KPN lost control of the German Simyo operations in 2014 when it sold E-Plus to Telefonica, although it retained a financial investment in Telefónica Germany.

== Simyo Nederland ==
Simyo Nederland acquired customers from Debitel (October 23, 2008) and Tringg (May 14, 2011) when KPN acquired these stakes in the Netherlands.
