= Fernando Quesada =

Spanish footballer (born 1994)

Nando Quesada
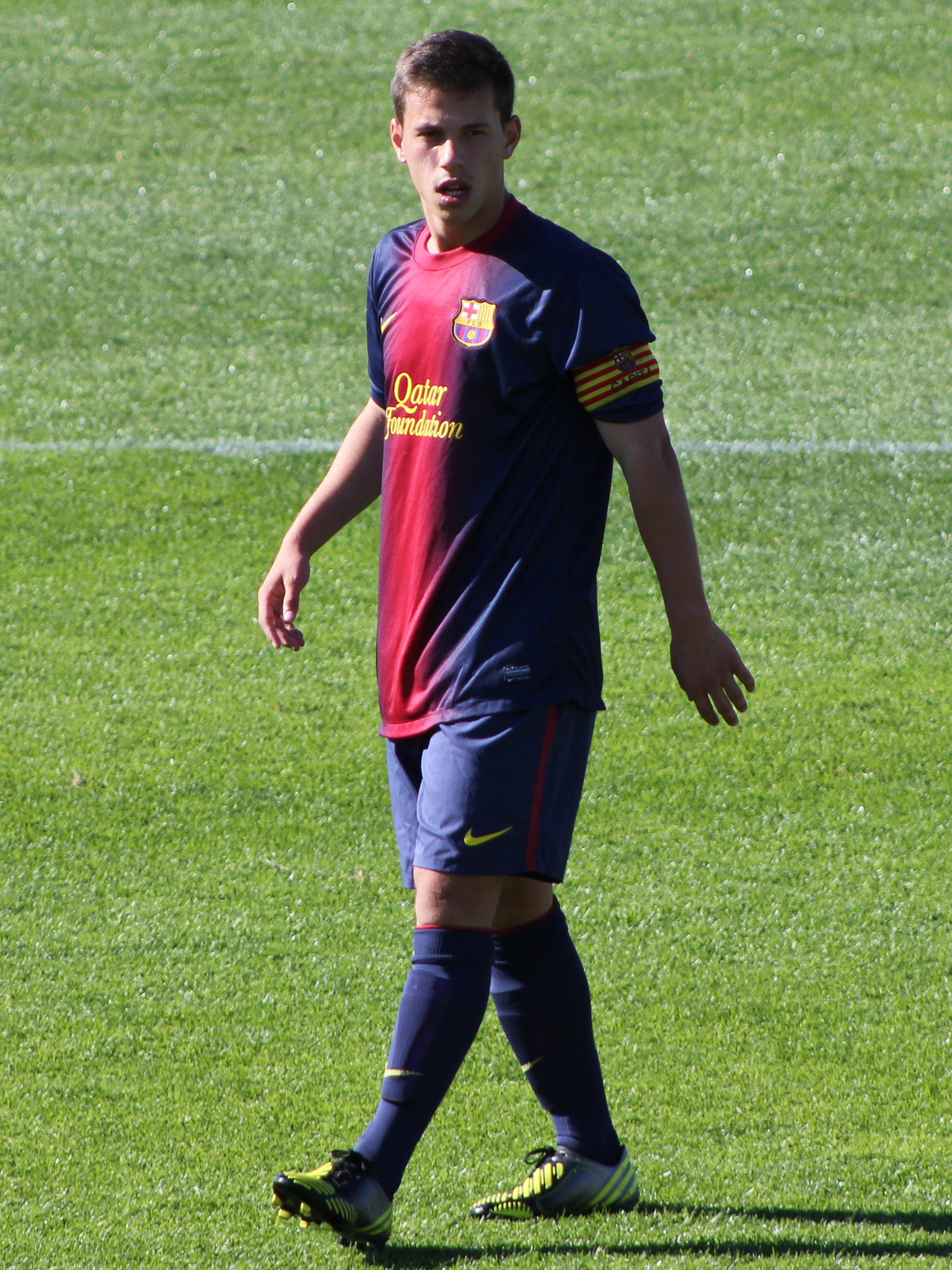
- Quesada with Barcelona Juvenil in 2012

Personal information
- Full name: Fernando Quesada Gallardo
- Date of birth: 5 January 1994 (age 32)
- Place of birth: Sabadell, Spain
- Height: 1.79 m (5 ft 10 in)
- Position: Midfielder

Team information
- Current team: Badalona Futur
- Number: 10

Youth career
- 2002–2003: Mercantil
- 2003–2013: Barcelona

Senior career*
Years	Team	Apps	(Gls)
2014–2015	Utrecht	3	(0)
2015	→ Achilles '29 (loan)	3	(0)
2015–2016	Llagostera B	9	(3)
2015–2017	Llagostera	17	(1)
2017–2018	Formentera	33	(2)
2018–2019	Elche	0	(0)
2018–2019	→ Sanluqueño (loan)	36	(0)
2019–2020	Sanluqueño	25	(2)
2020–2021	Melilla	8	(0)
2021–2022	Ebro	48	(2)
2022–2023	Formentera	34	(7)
2024–	Badalona Futur	6	(0)

International career
2009	Spain U16	3	(1)
2010–2011	Spain U17	6	(2)
- * Club domestic league appearances and goals as of 13 October 2024

Fernando "Nando" Quesada Gallardo (born 5 January 1994) is a Spanish professional footballer who plays as a central midfielder for Badalona Futur.

== Club career ==
Born in Sabadell, Barcelona, Catalonia, Quesada joined FC Barcelona's youth setup in 2003, aged nine, after starting it out at CE Mercantil. He was released in 2013, and subsequently had trials at Stoke City, Liverpool and PSV Eindhoven; he also signed a four-year deal with Genoa C.F.C. shortly after, but it was declaread void after he failed a medical.

On 31 January 2014, Quesada signed a three-and-a-half-year deal with fellow Eredivisie team FC Utrecht. He made his debut in the category on 2 February, in a 1–1 home draw against AFC Ajax.

On 2 February 2015, after only making three senior appearances, Quesada was loaned to Achilles '29 in the Eerste Divisie, until June. He was recalled on 24 March, and released in September.

On 8 October 2015, free agent Quesada signed for Segunda División side UE Llagostera. On 10 July 2017, after featuring sparingly, he signed for SD Formentera in Segunda División B.

On 28 June 2018, Quesada agreed to a contract with Elche CF, newly promoted to the second division. On 16 August, however, he was loaned to Atlético Sanluqueño CF in the third level, for one year, and signed permanently for the latter club on 5 July 2019.
