= Telefónica Germany =

German telecommunications company

Telefónica Deutschland Holding AG

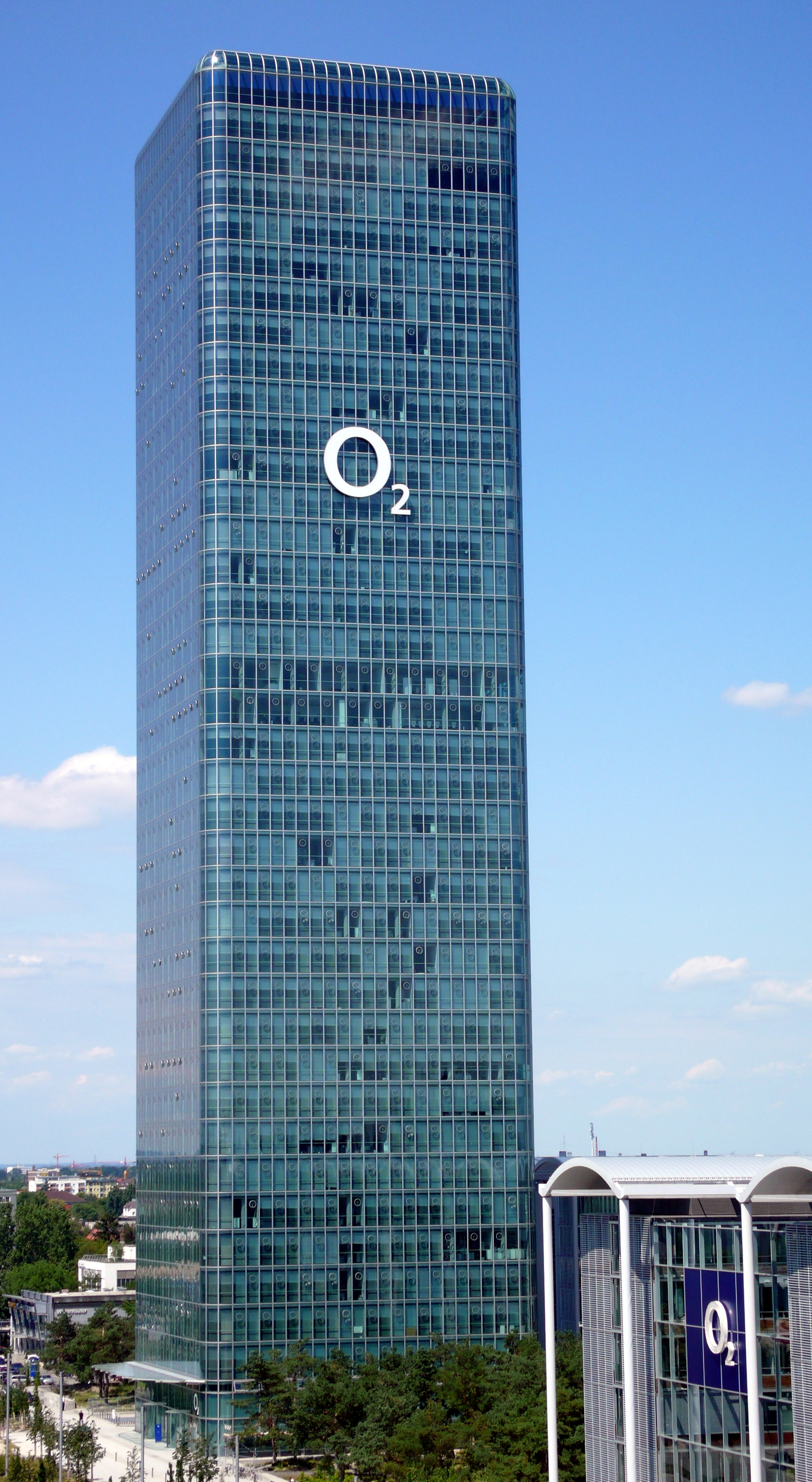
- Telefonica Germany's headquarters in Munich
- Type: Public
- Industry: Telecommunication
- Founded: 29 November 1995; 30 years ago
- Headquarters: Munich, Germany
- Area served: Germany
- Key people: Santiago Argelich Hesse (CEO)
- Services: Telecommunications; Internet service provider
- Revenue: ▼€8.172 billion (2025)
- Operating income: ▼€2.480 billion (2025)
- Net income: ▼€2.479 billion (2025)
- Number of employees: 7799 (2025)
- Parent: Telefónica (96.8%)
- Website: www.telefonica.de
- Footnotes; Financial data based on the 2025 Annual Report.

Telefónica Germany (German pronunciation: [teləˌfɔnɪkaː ˈdʒœːɐ̯məniː]; officially Telefónica Deutschland Holding AG) is a telecommunications operator in Germany, headquartered in Munich and owned by Telefónica group. The company provides mobile phone, LTE, 5G, broadband, cable internet, landline and IPTV services in Germany. The company sells products under the consumer brand O_{2}.

By the end of 2025, the company and its subsidiaries managed 35.2 million mobile phone as well as 2.4 million broadband connections. The company operates its own mobile network in Germany with over 29.000 network sites.

Telefónica Germany's main competitors are 1&1 Mobilfunk, Telekom Deutschland (Deutsche Telekom's German private customer unit) and Vodafone.

== History ==
The company trades under the O2 brand.

=== Inception ===
Telefónica Germany was founded in 1995 as VIAG Interkom, a joint venture between British Telecommunications (45%), VIAG (45%) and Telenor (10%). Viag Interkom was awarded Germany's second GSM-1800 license (also known as E-Netz (de; lit. E-Network in German)) in February 1997 and began operations on 1 February 1998 in eight German cities.

In 2001, BT acquired VIAG's remaining shares for €11.4 billion, and the company was renamed BT Germany, it became a part of BT Wireless, a group of subsidiary companies owned by BT. BT Wireless demerged from BT in 2001 to form mmO2 plc and Viag Interkom was relaunched as O_{2} Germany.

=== Takeover by Telefónica, S.A. and IPO ===
In 2005, mmO2 plc. of which O2 Germany was a part, was acquired by the Spanish Telefónica group. Telefónica additionally took over O_{2}'s subsidiaries in Great Britain and Ireland for a total of £17.7 billion as part of its expansion strategy into Europe. As a new subsidiary of Telefónica, O_{2} Germany rebranded as Telefónica O_{2} Germany in 2008.

Since 2006, the skyscraper Uptown Munich serves as the German headquarters. The 38-story highrise is the tallest building in Munich, designed by architect Christoph Ingenhoven.

In 2010, Telefónica O2 Germany bought broadband company HanseNet. The merged company was renamed to Telefónica Germany.

In a bid to boost revenues of up to €1.68 billion earmarked to flow into debt reduction, Telefónica announced its German subsidiary would be making an IPO (initial public offering). The IPO would involve the sale of a minority stake (23%) of the subsidiary on the 30 October 2012, prior to which point they had proceeded through a change in legal form. Telefónica Germany went public on the Franfurkt Stock Exchange on 30 October 2012 with an issue price of €5.60 under the ticker symbol O2D. Following the transition, in March 2013, Telefónica Germany was incorporated into the TecDAX stock exchange index.

=== Merger with E-Plus and network consolidation ===
In July of the same year, media reports stated that the company had proposed a merger with its rival, E-Plus, a German subsidiary of Royal KPN NV. The merger created the largest mobile phone provider in Germany in terms of network connections. The planned merger initially received resistance from a minority shareholder of E-Plus, America Movil SAB, but this was overcome in August 2013.

In mid-2014, the European Commission approved the sale of Dutch telco provider KPN's German subsidiary, E-Plus, subject to certain requirements being met. These included the transfer of 30% of network capacity and certain assets among other assurances. In exchange, KPN received €8.6 billion (€5 billion of which was cash).

In September 2014, Telefónica Germany announced the sale of €3.62 billion in new stock to help finance the acquisition of its competitor E-Plus from KPN. As part of the purchase, Telefónica reduced its stake in its subsidiary to 62.1%.

Subsidiary Telefónica Germany Next, founded in 2016 to focus on the analysis and services in the context of big data and the Internet of Things, was closed at the end of 2019.

In 2019, the European Commission accused Telefónica Germany of breaching the commitments it made when acquiring E-Plus in 2013. The statement of objections sent to the German company included potential fines or a reversal of the merger. Investigations found that Telefónica Germany did not offer competitors the "best prices” for access to their 4G network. The European Commissioner for Competition, Margrethe Vestager, urged full compliance with commitments made in merger decisions. Telefónica Germany responded that they acted in full compliance with the remedy in response to the commission's objections.

=== Delisting and CEO change ===
The company's shares were delisted from the Frankfurt Stock Exchange by 19 April 2024. Since then, the shares can no longer be traded on the Frankfurt Stock Exchange.

Current CEO Santiago Argelich Hesse is in office since 1 January 2026, succeeding Markus Haas, who led the company since January 2017.

== Network ==
Telefónica Germany operates its own mobile network. On 1 October 1998, VIAG Interkom, the predecessor of Telefónica Germany, started network operation in eight German cities, among them Munich, Berlin and Hanover. After the merger with E-Plus in 2014, Telefónica Germany finalized the integration of the O_{2} and E-Plus networks into one singular network in August 2017, eliminating the need for National Roaming between the networks. In October 2020, Telefónica Germany started operation of its 5G network in the five largest German cities Berlin, Hamburg, Munich, Frankfurt and Cologne.

By the end of 2025, the network consists of 29.000 network sites across Germany. The company currently offers GSM, LTE and 5G technology in its network and achieves a population coverage of nearly 100 percent for GSM and LTE technologies, and 99 percent for 5G, respectively. 3G technology has been phased out of the network by the end of 2021. The spectrum has been subsequently repurposed for more modern LTE connectivity.

At the latest 5G frequency auction, held mid-2019, Telefónica Germany acquired new frequencies worth €1.42 billion. In 2025, the frequencies in the 800 MHz, 1,800 MHz, and 2,600 MHz frequency ranges were prolonged by the German Federal Network Agency until December 2030, free of charge.

In April 2016 Telefónica announced the sale of 2,350 mobile sites to tower company Telxius for €587 million, followed by the sale of an additional 10,100 sites in June 2020 for €1.5 billion. In January 2021, the Spanish Telefónica group announced the sale of its subsidiary Telxius Telecom S.A. to American Towers for €7.7 billion. The sale included roughly 30,700 tower sites, including the recently purchased German sites.

Both during and after the finalization of the network integration, the network quality has been subject to repeated criticism. In the 2020 mobile network test conducted by trade magazine Connect, the network received a “very good” rating for the first time. Since 2020, the network of Telefónica Germany has been rated "very good" every year, most recently in November 2025. In addition, the network achieved a joint second place in the overall ranking for the first time, tied with Vodafone. Also in 2025, the network achieved a “very good” rating for the first time in CHIP magazine's mobile network test.

== Products ==
Telefónica Germany offers mobile and fixed-line services for both consumers and business customers under its core brand O_{2} and O_{2} Business, respectively. The company also works with retail partners who provide mobile services to their own customers via Telefónica Germany's network. These include Aldi Talk, Media Markt, Freenet, Lebara and Lyca Mobile. In addition Telefónica Germany also operates itself the secondary and ethnic brands Blau, Ay Yildiz, and Ortel Mobile.

Since 2019 Telefónica Germany is offering an IPTV solution under the O_{2} TV brand. The product was initially launched in cooperation with German streaming and video-on-demand platform waipu.tv and offered more than 100 TV channels via a smart TV or smartphone app. The partnership was terminated in September 2024. Since then, Telefónica Germany is offering O_{2} TV based on a solution developed for the Telefónica Group's global TV platform. Additionally, the company also re-sells and bundles the streaming services Netflix, Disney+ and WOW.

Under its O_{2} brand, Telefónica Germany sells smartphones, tablet computers, smartwatches, laptops, TVs, headphones, e-scooters as well as gaming consoles. Devices can be bought in installments of up to 48 months with 0 percent interest as part of the O_{2} MyHandy model. For business customers, the company also offers smartphones for rent as part of "device-as-a-service" model.

== See also ==
- List of mobile network operators in Europe
