= CD Orientación Marítima =

Spanish football club

Orientación Marítima
- Full name: Club Deportivo Orientación Marítima
- Founded: 1954
- Ground: Ciudad Deportiva, Arrecife, Canary Islands, Spain
- Capacity: 7,000
- Chairman: (Spain) Miguel Gopar
- Manager: (Spain) Juan Antonio Machín
- 2024–25: Primera Aficionados Lanzarote, 4th of 15
Home colours	Away colours

Club Deportivo Orientación Marítima is a Spanish football team based in Arrecife, Lanzarote, in the autonomous community of the Canary Islands. Founded in 1954, it plays in , holding home games at Ciudad Deportiva de Lanzarote, with a capacity of 7,000 spectators.

== Season to season ==
Season	Tier	Division	Place	Copa del Rey
1967–68	6	3ª Reg.	1st	
1968–69	6	3ª Reg.	1st	
1969–70	6	3ª Reg.	1st	
1970–71	5	2ª Reg.	3rd	
1971–72	5	2ª Reg.	4th	
1972–73	6	3ª Reg.	12th	
1973–74	6	3ª Reg.	11th	
1974–75	6	3ª Reg.	11th	
1975–1981	DNP			
1981–82	8	3ª Reg.	11th	
1982–83	8	3ª Reg.	4th	
1983–84	7	2ª Reg.	10th	
1984–85	7	2ª Reg.	8th	
1985–86	6	1ª Reg.	5th	
1986–87	6	1ª Reg.		
1987–88	6	1ª Reg.		
1988–89	5	Int. Pref.	10th	
1989–90	5	Int. Pref.	12th	
1990–91	5	Int. Pref.	18th	
1991–92	6	1ª Reg.	1st	

Season	Tier	Division	Place	Copa del Rey
1992–93	6	1ª Reg.	1st	
1993–94	6	1ª Reg.	5th	
1994–95	6	1ª Reg.	1st	
1995–96	6	1ª Reg.	2nd	
1996–97	5	Int. Pref.	4th	
1997–98	5	Int. Pref.	7th	
1998–99	5	Int. Pref.	1st	
1999–2000	4	3ª	10th	
2000–01	4	3ª	10th	
2001–02	4	3ª	10th	
2002–03	4	3ª	9th	
2003–04	4	3ª	11th	
2004–05	4	3ª	4th	
2005–06	4	3ª	3rd	
2006–07	3	2ª B	19th	
2007–08	4	3ª	8th	
2008–09	4	3ª	11th	
2009–10	4	3ª	13th	
2010–11	4	3ª	18th	
2011–2015	DNP			

Season	Tier	Division	Place	Copa del Rey
2015–16	6	1ª Afic.	9th	
2016–17	6	1ª Afic.	7th	
2017–18	DNP			
2018–19	DNP			
2019–20	6	1ª Afic.	8th	
2020–21	6	1ª Afic.	3rd	
2021–22	7	1ª Afic.	3rd	
2022–23	7	1ª Afic.	3rd	
2023–24	6	Int. Pref.	20th	
2024–25	7	1ª Afic.	4th	

- 1 season in Segunda División B
- 11 seasons in Tercera División

== Famous players ==
- (Spain) Nacho Castro
- (Spain) David Martín
- (Spain) Santi Torres
