= 2011 UEFA European Under-17 Championship qualifying round =

Football tournament

2011 UEFA European Under-17 Football Championship (qualifying round) will be the first round of qualifications for the Final Tournament of UEFA U-17 Championship 2011.

The qualifying round will be played between September 17 and November 1, 2010. The 52 teams were divided into 13 groups of four teams, with each group being contested as a mini-tournament, hosted by one of the group's teams. After all matches have been played, the 13 group winners and 13 group runners-up will advance to the Elite round.

Alongside the 26 winner and runner-up teams, the two best third-placed teams also qualify. These are determined after considering only their results against their group's top two teams, and applying the following criteria in this order:

1. Higher number of points obtained in these matches;
2. Superior goal difference from these matches;
3. Higher number of goals scored in these matches;
4. Fair-play conduct of the teams in all group matches in the qualifying round;
5. Drawing of lots.

The host team of each group's mini-tournament are indicated in italics in the tables below.

== Group 1 ==
Team	Pld	W	D	L	GF	GA	GD	Pts
Greece	3	2	1	0	5	1	+4	7
Croatia	3	1	2	0	4	3	+1	5
Israel	3	1	1	1	4	6	−2	4
Bulgaria	3	0	0	3	1	4	−3	0

Local time is UTC+2.

27 September 2010
16:00

Greece	1–0	Bulgaria
Soukias 40+1'	Report

Josip Uravić Pepi, Krk
Referee: (Ukraine) Sergiy Dankovskyy
27 September 2010
16:00

Croatia	2–2	Israel
Ivančić 34'; Špehar 63'	Report	Atar 68'; Altman 76'

Gradski stadion Crikvenica, Crikvenica
Referee: (Azerbaijan) Vusal Aliyev

29 September 2010
16:00

Greece	4–1	Israel
Gianitsanis 4'; Mavrias 39', 80+1'; Divanes 73'	Report	Zitoon 68'

Stadion Žuknica, Kostrena
Referee: (Republic of Ireland) Anthony Buttimer
29 September 2010
16:00

Bulgaria	1–2	Croatia
Zdravchev 62'	Report	Špehar 59', 78'

Stadion Mavrinci, Čavle
Referee: (Azerbaijan) Vusal Aliyev

2 October 2010
16:00

Croatia	0–0	Greece
	Report

Stadion Žuknica, Kostrena
Referee: (Republic of Ireland) Anthony Buttimer
2 October 2010
16:00

Israel	1–0	Bulgaria
Malka 64'	Report

Stadion Mavrinci, Čavle
Referee: (Ukraine) Sergiy Dankovskyy

== Group 2 ==
Team	Pld	W	D	L	GF	GA	GD	Pts
Germany	3	3	0	0	13	2	+11	9
Austria	3	1	1	1	5	3	+2	4
Bosnia and Herzegovina	3	1	0	2	5	10	−5	3
Estonia	3	0	1	2	2	10	−8	1

15 October 2010
12:00

Austria	3–0	Bosnia and Herzegovina
Derflinger 57'; Savić 76'; Dovedan 80+4'	Report

Kuusalu Stadium, Kuusalu
Referee: (Greece) Dimitrios Kalopoulos

15 October 2010
15:00

Germany	5–0	Estonia
Born 4'; Schnellhardt 40', 76'; Ayçiçek 74', 78'	Report

Kadrioru Stadium, Tallinn
Referee: (Romania) Augustus Viorel Constantin

17 October 2010
12:00

Bosnia and Herzegovina	1–6	Germany
Hodžić 11' (pen.)	Report	Yeşil 8', 34', 80+3'; Ayçiçek 26'; Can 28', 60'

Kuusalu Stadium, Kuusalu
Referee: (Romania) Augustus Viorel Constantin

17 October 2010
15:00

Austria	1–1	Estonia
Friesenbichler 8'	Report	Saarlas 6' (pen.)

Kadrioru Stadium, Tallinn
Referee: (Georgia (country)) George Vadachkoria

20 October 2010
15:00

Germany	2–1	Austria
Yeşil 14', 40'	Report	Wydra 46'

Kuusalu Stadium, Kuusalu
Referee: (Georgia (country)) George Vadachkoria

20 October 2010
15:00

Estonia	1–4	Bosnia and Herzegovina
Anissimov 8'	Report	Hodžić 2' (pen.), 9', 50'; Rahmanović 75'

Kadrioru Stadium, Tallinn
Referee: (Greece) Dimitrios Kalopoulos

== Group 3 ==
Team	Pld	W	D	L	GF	GA	GD	Pts
England	3	2	1	0	5	1	+4	7
Georgia	3	2	1	0	4	2	+2	7
Poland	3	0	1	2	1	3	−2	1
Sweden	3	0	1	2	0	4	−4	1

Local time is UTC+4.

18 October 2010
13:00

Poland	1–2	Georgia
Uryga 16' (pen.)	Report	Endeladze 12'; Arabuli 18'

Boris Paichadze Stadium, Tbilisi
Referee: (North Macedonia) Goran Spirkoski

18 October 2010
13:00

England	3–0	Sweden
Hope 8', 42'; Powell 23'	Report

Mikheil Meskhi Stadium, Tbilisi
Referee: (Austria) Rene Eisner

20 October 2010
13:00

Poland	0–0	Sweden
	Report

Mikheil Meskhi Stadium, Tbilisi
Referee: (Lithuania) Nerijus Dunauskas

20 October 2010
13:00

Georgia	1–1	England
Arabuli 63'	Report	Hope 9'

Boris Paichadze Stadium, Tbilisi
Referee: (Austria) Rene Eisner

23 October 2010
13:00

England	1–0	Poland
Turgott 62'	Report

Mikheil Meskhi Stadium, Tbilisi
Referee: (Lithuania) Nerijus Dunauskas

23 October 2010
13:00

Sweden	0–1	Georgia
	Report	Samushia 80+2'

Boris Paichadze Stadium, Tbilisi
Referee: (North Macedonia) Goran Spirkoski

== Group 4 ==
Team	Pld	W	D	L	GF	GA	GD	Pts
Norway	3	3	0	0	6	0	+6	9
Republic of Ireland	3	2	0	1	5	2	+3	6
Albania	3	0	1	2	1	5	−4	1
Malta	3	0	1	2	2	7	−5	1

Local time is UTC+2.

25 September 2010
11:00

Republic of Ireland	3–1	Malta
Murphy 12'; Drennan 66'; Dillon 79'	Report	Muscat 72'

Ta' Qali National Stadium, Ta' Qali
Referee: (Iceland) Magnus Thorisson

25 September 2010
14:00

Norway	2–0	Albania
Berisha 5', 42'	Report

Ta' Qali National Stadium, Ta' Qali
Referee: (Moldova) Ghennadi Sidenco

27 September 2010
14:00

Albania	0–2	Republic of Ireland
	Report	Roberts 1'; Murphy 10'

Ta' Qali National Stadium, Ta' Qali
Referee: (Moldova) Ghennadi Sidenco

27 September 2010
17:00

Norway	3–0	Malta
Ahmadi 53'; Kalve 56'; Vo 70'	Report

Gronner, Ta' Qali
Referee: (Bosnia and Herzegovina) Emir Alečković

30 September 2010
14:00

Republic of Ireland	0–1	Norway
	Report	Vo 19'

Hibernians Ground, Paola
Referee: (Iceland) Magnus Thorisson

30 September 2010
17:00

Malta	1–1	Albania
Zerafa 19'	Report	Muskaj 3'

Ta' Qali National Stadium, Ta' Qali
Referee: (Bosnia and Herzegovina) Emir Alečković

== Group 5 ==
Team	Pld	W	D	L	GF	GA	GD	Pts
Portugal	3	3	0	0	8	1	+7	9
Northern Ireland	3	1	1	1	7	3	+4	4
Montenegro	3	1	1	1	2	4	−2	4
Azerbaijan	3	0	0	3	1	10	−9	0

Local time is UTC+1.

22 October 2010
17:00

Portugal	2–0	Azerbaijan
Paciência 54'; Silva 59'	Report

Sports Center CF Fão, Fão
Referee: (Slovakia) Vladimir Vnuk

22 October 2010
17:00

Northern Ireland	0–0	Montenegro
	Report

Estádio do Varzim Sport Club, Póvoa de Varzim
Referee: (Austria) Harald Lechner

24 October 2010
17:00

Portugal	3–0	Montenegro
Silva 13', 38', 54'	Report

Estádio do Varzim Sport Club, Póvoa de Varzim
Referee: (Slovakia) Vladimir Vnuk

24 October 2010
17:00

Azerbaijan	0–6	Northern Ireland
	Report	Wilson 9'; Rogan 12', 68'; Joey 27'; McCartan 33'; McKinney 39'

Sports Center CF Fão, Fão
Referee: (Moldova) Igor Satchi

27 October 2010
17:00

Northern Ireland	1–3	Portugal
Rogan 39'	Report	Gibson 40+1' (o.g.); Paciência 46' (pen.); Mané 74'

Estádio Cidade de Barcelos, Barcelos
Referee: (Austria) Harald Lechner

27 October 2010
17:00

Montenegro	2–1	Azerbaijan
Poček 71'; Kosović 72'	Report	Alaskarov 67'

Sports Center CF Fão, Fão
Referee: (Moldova) Igor Satchi

== Group 6 ==
Team	Pld	W	D	L	GF	GA	GD	Pts
Romania	3	3	0	0	12	0	+12	9
Belarus	3	2	0	1	18	4	+14	6
Kazakhstan	3	1	0	2	4	7	−3	3
Liechtenstein	3	0	0	3	0	23	−23	0

Local time is UTC+3.

21 September 2010
15:00

Romania	1–0	Kazakhstan
Bumba 6'	Report

City Stadium, Molodechno
Referee: Ignasi Villamayor Rozados (Andorra)
21 September 2010
15:00

Belarus	12–0	Liechtenstein
Bialiauski 7'; Savitskiy 10', 12', 23', 33'; Huzel 11'; Zatenko 15', 17'; Kazlouski 41'; Rassadkin 58', 79'; Karpovich 77'	Report

Torpedo Stadium, Zhodino
Referee: Fariz Yusifov (Azerbaijan)

23 September 2010
15:00

Romania	9–0	Liechtenstein
Himcinschi 10', 12', 40', 74', 78'; Buia 30'; Bumba 53'; Vastag 59'; Rosu 60'	Report

City Stadium, Molodechno
Referee: Ignasi Villamayor Rozados (Andorra)
23 September 2010
15:00

Kazakhstan	2–6	Belarus
Li 12', 30'	Report	Savitskiy 11', 24', 29', 40+2'; Zatenko 19'; Kazlouski 25'

Torpedo Stadium, Zhodino
Referee: Marco Borg (Malta)

26 September 2010
15:00

Belarus	0–2	Romania
	Report	Himcinschi 37', 54'

Torpedo Stadium, Zhodino
Referee: Marco Borg (Malta)
26 September 2010
15:00

Liechtenstein	0–2	Kazakhstan
	Report	Morozov 13'; Li 33'

City Stadium, Molodechno
Referee: Fariz Yusifov (Azerbaijan)

== Group 7 ==
Team	Pld	W	D	L	GF	GA	GD	Pts
Iceland	3	2	0	1	6	5	+1	6
Turkey	3	2	0	1	9	3	+6	6
Czech Republic	3	1	1	1	6	9	−3	4
Armenia	3	0	1	2	2	6	−4	1

- Iceland ranked ahead of Turkey on head-to-head result

Local time is UTC.

22 September 2010
16:00

Turkey	3–0	Armenia
Yokuşlu 15'; Yılmaz 69'; Deniz 73'	Report

KR-völlur, Reykjavík
Referee: (France) Clément Turpin

22 September 2010
21:15

Czech Republic	4–2	Iceland
Stratil 45', 56', 80+2' (pen.); Verner 75'	Report	Sigurjónsson 66'; Sveinsson 70'

Laugardalsvöllur, Reykjavík
Referee: (Croatia) Damir Batinić

24 September 2010
15:30

Czech Republic	1–1	Armenia
Čermák 17'	Report	Papikyan 59' (pen.)

Akranesvöllur, Akranes
Referee: (Norway) Ken Henry Johnsen

24 September 2010
18:00

Iceland	2–0	Turkey
Hermannsson 57'; Sigurjónsson 80+3' (pen.)	Report

Víkingsvöllur, Reykjavík
Referee: (Croatia) Damir Batinić

27 September 2010
18:00

Turkey	6–1	Czech Republic
Şimşek 19', 25', 54'; Şahin 46', 77'; Şentürk 71'	Report

Grindavíkurvöllur, Grindavík
Referee: (France) Clément Turpin

27 September 2010
18:00

Armenia	1–2	Iceland
Minasyan 12'	Report	Sveinsson 2'; Sigurjónsson 53' (pen.)

Keflavíkurvöllur, Keflavik
Referee: (Norway) Ken Henry Johnsen

== Group 8 ==
Team	Pld	W	D	L	GF	GA	GD	Pts
Denmark	3	3	0	0	10	0	+10	9
Belgium	3	2	0	1	9	4	+4	6
Lithuania	3	1	0	2	3	12	−9	3
Wales	3	0	0	3	0	6	−6	0

Local time is UTC+3.

22 September 2010
11:00

Wales	0–1	Denmark
	Report	Fischer 48'

Sūduva Stadium, Marijampolė
Referee: (Malta) Christopher Lautier

22 September 2010
15:00

Belgium	5–2	Lithuania
Carvalho 51', 63'; Artminavicius 71' (o.g.); Raman 72', 78'	Report	Judickas 40+1'; Artminavicius 80+2'

S. Darius and S. Girėnas Stadium, Kaunas
Referee: (Turkey) Halis Özkahya

24 September 2010
11:00

Belgium	0–2	Denmark
	Report	Zohore 28'; Nørgaard 30'

Sūduva Stadium, Marijampolė
Referee: (Turkey) Halis Özkahya

24 September 2010
15:00

Lithuania	1–0	Wales
Kazlauskas 49'	Report

S. Darius and S. Girėnas Stadium, Kaunas
Referee: (Russia) Vladimir Pettay

27 September 2010
15:00

Wales	0–4	Belgium
	Report	Diouck 4', 46'; Carvalho 26'; Raman 80+3'

Sūduva Stadium, Marijampolė
Referee: (Malta) Christopher Lautier

27 September 2010
15:00

Denmark	7–0	Lithuania
Fischer 12', 29', 48', 50', 61'; Zohore 36', 73'	Report

S. Darius and S. Girėnas Stadium, Kaunas
Referee: (Russia) Vladimir Pettay

== Group 9 ==
Team	Pld	W	D	L	GF	GA	GD	Pts
Italy	3	3	0	0	6	3	+3	9
France	3	1	1	1	3	3	0	4
Slovenia	3	1	0	2	4	4	0	3
Cyprus	3	0	1	2	1	4	−3	1

Local time is UTC+3.

27 October 2010
14:00

France	1–0	Slovenia
Yaisien 60'	Report

Municipal Stadium, Geroskipou
Referee: (Montenegro) Pavle Radovanović

27 October 2010
14:00

Italy	1–0	Cyprus
Maggio 6'	Report

Peyia Municipal Stadium, Paphos
Referee: (Wales) Huw Jones

29 October 2010
14:00

France	1–1	Cyprus
Yaisien 18'	Report	Andreou 80+2'

Peyia Municipal Stadium, Paphos
Referee: (Montenegro) Pavle Radovanović

29 October 2010
14:00

Slovenia	2–3	Italy
Pihler 19'; Čeh 40'	Report	Rugani 24'; Monachello 40+1'; Abbraciante 69'

Municipal Stadium, Geroskipou
Referee: (Bulgaria) Georgi Yordanov

1 November 2010
14:00

Italy	2–1	France
Abbraciante 14'; Maggio 78'	Report	Yaisien 65'

Municipal Stadium, Geroskipou
Referee: (Wales) Huw Jones

1 November 2010
14:00

Cyprus	0–2	Slovenia
	Report	Golob 17'; Kyriakou 32' (o.g.)

Peyia Municipal Stadium, Paphos
Referee: (Bulgaria) Georgi Yordanov

== Group 10 ==
Team	Pld	W	D	L	GF	GA	GD	Pts
Slovakia	3	2	1	0	9	1	+8	7
Hungary	3	2	1	0	8	1	+7	7
Faroe Islands	3	0	1	2	0	5	−5	1
Andorra	3	0	1	2	0	10	−10	1

Local time is UTC+2.

20 September 2010
16:30

Slovakia	3–0	Faroe Islands
Rusnák 18'; Faško 23'; Pisár 71'	Report

Stadion Bük, Bük
Referee: (Bulgaria) Angel Angelov

20 September 2010
16:30

Hungary	5–0	Andorra
Szécsi 35'; Barcsay 59', 72'; Kleinheisler 68'; Sipőcz 79'	Report

Stadion Rohonci Út, Szombathely
Referee: (Finland) Petteri Kari

22 September 2010
16:30

Slovakia	5–0	Andorra
Šmehyl 16', 30' (pen.), 52'; Revák 22'; Brigant 80'	Report

Stadion Rohonci Út, Szombathely
Referee: (Bulgaria) Angel Angelov

22 September 2010
16:30

Faroe Islands	0–2	Hungary
	Report	Barcsay 53'; Pintér 69'

Stadion Bük, Bük
Referee: (Georgia (country)) Levan Kvaratskhelia

25 September 2010
12:30

Hungary	1–1	Slovakia
Huller 50'	Report	Pisár 64'

Stadion Rohonci Út, Szombathely
Referee: (Finland) Petteri Kari

25 September 2010
12:30

Andorra	0–0	Faroe Islands
	Report

Stadion Bük, Bük
Referee: (Georgia (country)) Levan Kvaratskhelia

== Group 11 ==
Team	Pld	W	D	L	GF	GA	GD	Pts
Netherlands	3	2	1	0	8	1	+7	7
Ukraine	3	1	2	0	2	1	+1	5
Latvia	3	1	1	1	2	1	+1	4
San Marino	3	0	0	3	0	9	−9	0

Local time is UTC+2.

21 October 2010
17:00

Ukraine	1–0	San Marino
Khlyobas 48'	Report

Montecchio stadium, Montecchio
Attendance: 300
Referee: (Montenegro) Jovan Kaludjerovic

21 October 2010
20:30

Netherlands	1–0	Latvia
Memphis 21'	Report

Stadio Olimpico, Serravalle
Attendance: 50
Referee: (Cyprus) Marios Stamatis

23 October 2010
17:00

Ukraine	0–0	Latvia
	Report

Stadio Olimpico, Serravalle
Attendance: 15
Referee: (Hungary) Mihaly Fabian

23 October 2010
20:30

San Marino	0–6	Netherlands
	Report	Achahbar 2', 40'; Memphis 18', 27', 34' (pen.); Horsten 47'

Stadio Olimpico, Serravalle
Attendance: 200
Referee: (Montenegro) Jovan Kaludjerovic

26 October 2010
20:30

Netherlands	1–1	Ukraine
Yurchenko 6' (o.g.)	Report	Yurchenko 48'

Stadio Olimpico, Serravalle
Attendance: 50
Referee: (Hungary) Mihaly Fabian

26 October 2010
20:30

Latvia	2–0	San Marino
Ikaunieks 27' (pen.); Punculs 35'	Report

Montecchio stadium, Montecchio
Attendance: 100
Referee: (Cyprus) Marios Stamatis

== Group 12 ==
Team	Pld	W	D	L	GF	GA	GD	Pts
Switzerland	3	2	1	0	4	1	+3	7
Scotland	3	2	1	0	3	1	+2	7
Luxembourg	3	1	0	2	4	3	+1	3
Macedonia	3	0	0	3	1	7	−6	0

Local time is UTC+2.

17 September 2010
17:00

Scotland	1–0	Macedonia
Chalmers 79'	Report

Stade rue Henri Dunant, Beggen
Referee: (Faroe Islands) Petur Reinert

17 September 2010
19:00

Switzerland	1–0	Luxembourg
Marinković 17'	Report

Stade Junglinster, Junglinster
Referee: (Poland) Paweł Gil

19 September 2010
17:00

Switzerland	3–1	Macedonia
Constantin 45'; Adili 49'; Ndongo 56'	Report	Angelov 60'

Stade Municipal, Bettembourg
Referee: (Faroe Islands) Petur Reinert

19 September 2010
19:00

Luxembourg	1–2	Scotland
Philipps 75'	Report	Fraser 62'; Herron 80'

Stade rue Henri Dunant, Beggen
Referee: (Belarus) Valery Vyalichka

22 September 2010
17:00

Scotland	0–0	Switzerland
	Report

Stade Junglinster, Junglinster
Referee: (Poland) Paweł Gil

22 September 2010
19:00

Macedonia	0–3	Luxembourg
	Report	Lima 28'; Schneider 52'; Kipulu 67'

Stade Municipal, Bettembourg
Referee: (Belarus) Valery Vyalichka

== Group 13 ==
Team	Pld	W	D	L	GF	GA	GD	Pts
Spain	3	3	0	0	9	2	+7	9
Russia	3	1	1	1	7	4	+3	4
Finland	3	1	1	1	3	4	−1	4
Moldova	3	0	0	3	2	11	−9	0

Local time is UTC+2.

16 October 2010
16:00

Russia	1–1	Finland
Serderov 28'	Report	Rannikko 68'

Guillermo Amor, Benidorm
Referee: (Malta) Clayton Pisani

16 October 2010
18:00

Spain	4–1	Moldova
Denis 17'; Quesada 54'; José 67' de Tomás 80+2'	Report	Ciofu 11'

Guillermo Amor, Benidorm
Referee: (Croatia) Ante Vučemilović-Šimunović Jr.

18 October 2010
12:00

Russia	5–1	Moldova
Serderov 1', 18', 61'; Kirisov 25'; Ambartsumyan 59'	Report	Spataru 53'

Guillermo Amor, Benidorm
Referee: (Malta) Clayton Pisani

18 October 2010
18:00

Finland	0–3	Spain
	Report	Iker 8', 20'; Fran Pastor 39'

Guillermo Amor, Benidorm
Referee: (Kazakhstan) Anatoliy Vishnichenko

21 October 2010
18:00

Spain	2–1	Russia
Saúl 23'; Quesada 33'	Report	Serderov 30'

Guillermo Amor, Benidorm
Referee: (Croatia) Ante Vučemilović-Šimunović Jr.

21 October 2010
18:00

Moldova	0–2	Finland
	Report	Hietikko 44'; Ojala 66'

Camilo Cano, La Nucía
Referee: (Kazakhstan) Anatoliy Vishnichenko

== Ranking of 3rd placed teams ==
Counting results against group winners and runners-up. Top 2 advanced to the Elite Round.

Group	Team	Pld	W	D	L	GF	GA	GD	Pts
7	Czech Republic	2	1	0	1	5	8	−3	3
11	Latvia	2	0	1	1	0	1	−1	1
1	Israel	2	0	1	1	3	6	−3	1
13	Finland	2	0	1	1	1	4	−3	1
5	Montenegro	2	0	1	1	0	3	−3	1
9	Slovenia	2	0	0	2	2	4	−2	0
3	Poland	2	0	0	2	1	3	−2	0
12	Luxembourg	2	0	0	2	1	3	−2	0
4	Albania	2	0	0	2	0	4	−4	0
6	Kazakhstan	2	0	0	2	2	7	−5	0
10	Faroe Islands	2	0	0	2	0	5	−5	0
2	Bosnia and Herzegovina	2	0	0	2	1	9	−8	0
8	Lithuania	2	0	0	2	2	12	−10	0
