= 2011 UEFA European Under-17 Championship elite round =

Football Championship

2011 UEFA European Under-17 Football Championship (Elite Round) was the second round of qualifications for the final tournament of UEFA U-17 Championship 2011. The 28 teams advancing from the qualifying round were distributed into seven groups of four teams each, with each group contesting in a round-robin format, with one of the four teams hosting all six group games. The seven group-winning teams automatically qualified for the final tournament in Serbia. Each team was placed in one of four drawing pots, according to their qualifying round results. The seven sides with the best records were placed in Pot A, and so forth until Pot D, which contained the seven teams with the weakest records. During the draw, each group were filled with one team from every pot, with the only restriction being that teams that played each other in the first qualifying round can not be drawn into the same group again. The draw was held at 30 November 2010 at 11:15 (CET) at Nyon, Switzerland.

Pot A	Pot B	Pot C	Pot D
Romania; Germany; Denmark; Spain; Portugal; Norway; Italy	Slovakia; Hungary; Netherlands; England; Greece; Switzerland; Georgia	Scotland; Belarus; Turkey; Belgium; Republic of Ireland; Iceland; Croatia	Ukraine; Northern Ireland; Russia; Austria; Latvia; France; Czech Republic

The hosts of the seven one-venue mini-tournament groups are indicated below in italics.

The matches were played between 9–31 March 2011.

== Group 1 ==
Team	Pld	W	D	L	GF	GA	GD	Pts
Czech Republic	3	2	1	0	4	2	+2	7
Scotland	3	1	2	0	3	1	+2	5
Italy	3	0	2	1	2	3	−1	2
Slovakia	3	0	1	2	1	4	−3	1

9 March 2011
15:00

Italy	0–0	Scotland
	Report

Stadio Giuseppe Capozza, Casarano
Referee: Liran Liany (Israel)
9 March 2011
15:00

Slovakia	0–1	Czech Republic
	Report	Fojtášek 80'

Stadio Giovanni Paolo II, Nardò
Referee: João Capela (Portugal)

11 March 2011
15:00

Italy	1–2	Czech Republic
Verre 4'	Report	Mašek 60'; Lüftner 64'

Stadio Giovanni Paolo II, Nardò
Referee: João Capela (Portugal)
11 March 2011
15:00

Scotland	2–0	Slovakia
Kennedy 49', 62'	Report

Stadio Giuseppe Capozza, Casarano
Referee: Ognjen Valjic (Bosnia and Herzegovina)

14 March 2011
15:00

Slovakia	1–1	Italy
Rusnák 43'	Report	Tassi 80+3'

Stadio Via del Mare, Lecce
Referee: Liran Liany (Israel)
14 March 2011
15:00

Czech Republic	1–1	Scotland
Stratil 62'	Report	Herron 13'

Stadio Giuseppe Capozza, Casarano
Referee: Ognjen Valjic (Bosnia and Herzegovina)

== Group 2 ==
Team	Pld	W	D	L	GF	GA	GD	Pts
Netherlands	3	2	1	0	3	1	+2	7
Croatia	3	1	2	0	2	0	+2	5
Austria	3	1	0	2	3	4	−1	3
Portugal	3	0	1	2	0	3	−3	1

24 March 2011
17:00

Portugal	0–0	Croatia
	Report

Sportcomplex Varkenoord, Rotterdam
Referee: Alexey Eskov (Russia)
24 March 2011
19:00

Netherlands	2–1	Austria
Achahbar 67' 69'	Report	Derflinger 71'

Sportpark De Bongerd, Barendrecht
Referee: Nikolaj Hänni (Switzerland)

26 March 2011
14:00

Portugal	0–2	Austria
	Report	Gregoritsch 52'; Gärtner 59' (pen.)

Sportpark Smitshoek, Barendrecht
Referee: Ioannis Anastasiou (Cyprus)
26 March 2011
16:00

Croatia	0–0	Netherlands
	Report

Sportcomplex Varkenoord, Rotterdam
Referee: Alexey Eskov (Russia)

29 March 2011
19:00

Netherlands	1–0	Portugal
Boëtius 37'	Report

Sportcomplex Varkenoord, Rotterdam
Referee: Nikolaj Hänni (Switzerland)
29 March 2011
19:00

Austria	0–2	Croatia
	Report	Šimunović 57'; Špehar 70'

Sportpark De Bongerd, Barendrecht
Referee: Ioannis Anastasiou (Cyprus)

== Group 3 ==
Team	Pld	W	D	L	GF	GA	GD	Pts
Denmark	3	2	1	0	4	2	+2	7
Republic of Ireland	3	1	2	0	7	4	+3	5
Greece	3	1	1	1	3	2	+1	4
Latvia	3	0	0	3	1	7	−6	0

23 March 2011
11:00

Greece	2–0	Latvia
Anastasopoulos 2'; Demirtzoglou 80+3'	Report

Komotini Stadium, Komotini
Attendance: 1500
Referee: Ivan Kružliak (Slovakia)
23 March 2011
14:00

Denmark	2–2	Republic of Ireland
Fischer 39' (pen.); Zohore 77'	Report	Roberts 28'; George 80+1'

Municipal Stadium Fotis Kosmas, Alexandroupoli
Attendance: 50
Referee: Christof Dierick (Belgium)

25 March 2011
12:00

Republic of Ireland	1–1	Greece
George 77'	Report	Gianitsanis 4'

Municipal Stadium Fotis Kosmas, Alexandroupoli
Attendance: 250
Referee: Oleksandr Derdo (Ukraine)
25 March 2011
14:00

Denmark	1–0	Latvia
Holst 76'	Report

Komotini Stadium, Komotini
Attendance: 300
Referee: Ivan Kružliak (Slovakia)

28 March 2011
11:00

Greece	0–1	Denmark
	Report	Poulsen 80+1'

Komotini Stadium, Komotini
Attendance: 1200
Referee: Christof Dierick (Belgium)
28 March 2011
11:00

Latvia	1–4	Republic of Ireland
Punculs 19'	Report	Roberts 10', 55'; Garmston 69', 75'

Municipal Stadium Fotis Kosmas, Alexandroupoli
Attendance: 50
Referee: Oleksandr Derdo (Ukraine)

== Group 4 ==
Team	Pld	W	D	L	GF	GA	GD	Pts
Germany	3	3	0	0	6	0	+6	9
Turkey	3	1	1	1	4	5	−1	4
Switzerland	3	1	0	2	2	4	−2	3
Ukraine	3	0	1	2	2	5	−3	1

24 March 2011
11:00

Germany	2–0	Turkey
Yeşil 11'; Ayçiçek 58'	Report

Grotenburg Stadion, Krefeld
Referee: Kristo Tohver (Estonia)
24 March 2011
15:00

Switzerland	1–0	Ukraine
Tsimba 42'	Report

Stadion Ratingen, Ratingen
Referee: Padraigh Sutton (Ireland)

26 March 2011
11:00

Turkey	2–1	Switzerland
Ari 27'; Şentürk 69'	Report	Tsimba 20'

Stadion am Eisenbrand, Meerbusch
Referee: Dag Vidar Hafsås (Norway)
26 March 2011
15:00

Germany	2–0	Ukraine
Perrey 10'; Yeşil 31'	Report

Lena-Arena, Düsseldorf
Referee: Padraigh Sutton (Ireland)

29 March 2011
11:00

Switzerland	0–2	Germany
	Report	Yeşil 62'; Röcker 67'

Paul-Janes-Stadion, Düsseldorf
Referee: Dag Vidar Hafsås (Norway)
29 March 2011
11:00

Ukraine	2–2	Turkey
Blyznychenko 36'; Khlyobas 69'	Report	Şimşek 68'; Niyaz 80+1'

Stadion Ratingen, Ratingen
Referee: Kristo Tohver (Estonia)

== Group 5 ==
Team	Pld	W	D	L	GF	GA	GD	Pts
England	3	3	0	0	7	4	+3	9
Spain	3	2	0	1	9	4	+5	6
Northern Ireland	3	1	0	2	5	9	−4	3
Belgium	3	0	0	3	3	7	−4	0

26 March 2011
15:00

England	3–2	Northern Ireland
Turgott 40+1'; Hope 42' (pen.); Powell 49'	Report	McCartan 35', 65' (pen.)

De Leunen, Geel
Referee: Martin Strömbergsson (Sweden)
26 March 2011
18:00

Spain	3–1	Belgium
Moisés 72'; Deulofeu 77'; Fede 80+5'	Report	Carvalho 47'

Georges Claesstadion, Mol
Referee: Kenn Hansen (Denmark)

28 March 2011
17:00

Spain	5–1	Northern Ireland
Deulofeu 19'; Suárez 31'; Hernández 38', 68'; Calvet 80+4'	Report	Morgan 59'

Staf Janssensstadion, Tielen
Referee: Yuriy Mozharovskyy (Ukraine)
28 March 2011
19:30

Belgium	1–2	England
Cabumi 37'	Report	Powell 40'; Turgott 66'

De Leunen, Geel
Referee: Kenn Hansen (Denmark)

31 March 2011
19:00

England	2–1	Spain
Redmond 55'; Jackson 62'	Report	Iñiguez 80+4'

Georges Claesstadion, Mol
Referee: Martin Strömbergsson (Sweden)
31 March 2011
19:00

Northern Ireland	2–1	Belgium
McAloon 41'; Morgan 49'	Report	Praet 61'

Staf Janssensstadion, Tielen
Referee: Yuriy Mozharovskyy (Ukraine)

== Group 6 ==
Team	Pld	W	D	L	GF	GA	GD	Pts
France	3	2	1	0	13	2	+11	7
Norway	3	2	1	0	12	3	+9	7
Belarus	3	1	0	2	2	14	−12	3
Georgia	3	0	0	3	0	8	−8	0

25 March 2011
15:00

Norway	5–1	Belarus
Kwoeme 29'; Rønning 36', 40+1', 56'; Berisha 47'	Report	Savitskiy 22'

Parc du Val de Chezine, Saint-Herblain
Referee: Szymon Marciniak (Poland)
25 March 2011
19:00

Georgia	0–2	France
	Report	Haller 31'; Yaisien 50'

Stade de la Beaujoire, Nantes
Referee: Tasos Sidiropoulos (Greece)

27 March 2011
15:00

Belarus	1–0	Georgia
Savitskiy 23'	Report

Municipal, Vigneux-de-Bretagne
Referee: Tasos Sidiropoulos (Greece)
27 March 2011
18:00

Norway	2–2	France
Kwoeme 9'; Furu 61'	Report	Haller 13'; Laborde 30'

Stade Marcel Saupin, Nantes
Referee: Danny Makkelie (Netherlands)

30 March 2011
17:00

Georgia	0–5	Norway
	Report	Rønning 27', 38'; Ahmadi 72', 79', 80+1'

Stade Marcel Saupin, Nantes
Referee: Danny Makkelie (Netherlands)
30 March 2011
17:00

France	9–0	Belarus
Yaisien 14', 35', 39', 68'; Nangis 21', 24', 71'; Laporte 27'; Haller 80+1' (pen.)	Report

Stade du Moulin-Boisseau, Carquefou
Referee: Szymon Marciniak (Poland)

== Group 7 ==
Team	Pld	W	D	L	GF	GA	GD	Pts
Romania	3	2	1	0	4	2	+2	7
Russia	3	2	0	1	5	3	+2	6
Hungary	3	1	0	2	4	4	0	3
Iceland	3	0	1	2	0	4	−4	1

24 March 2011
15:00

Romania	0–0	Iceland
	Report

Stadion Bük, Bük
Referee: Sven Bindels (Luxembourg)
24 March 2011
17:00

Hungary	1–2	Russia
Szécsi 7'	Report	Fedchuk 60'; Khomuha 63'

Rohonci Street Stadium, Szombathely
Referee: Enea Jorgji (Albania)

26 March 2011
15:00

Romania	2–1	Russia
Buia 57' (pen.); Himcinsch 72'	Report	Serderov 23'

Rohonci Street Stadium, Szombathely
Referee: Arnold Hunter (Northern Ireland)
26 March 2011
15:00

Iceland	0–2	Hungary
	Report	Novothny 40+2'; Szécsi 42'

Stadion Bük, Bük
Referee: Sven Bindels (Luxembourg)

29 March 2011
17:00

Hungary	1–2	Romania
Szécsi 74'	Report	Filip 2'; Roșu 34'

Rohonci Street Stadium, Szombathely
Referee: Arnold Hunter (Northern Ireland)
29 March 2011
17:00

Russia	2–0	Iceland
Serderov 10'; Fedchuk 21'	Report

Stadion Bük, Bük
Referee: Enea Jorgji (Albania)
