= 2013 UEFA European Under-21 Championship qualification Group 7 =

Football tournament qualification stage

The teams competing in Group 7 of the 2013 UEFA European Under-21 Championship qualifying competition were Hungary, Italy, Liechtenstein, Republic of Ireland, and Turkey.

== Standings ==
Pos	Team	Pld	W	D	L	GF	GA	GD	Pts	Qualification	(Italy)	(Turkey)	(Republic of Ireland)	(Hungary)	(Liechtenstein)
1	Italy	8	6	1	1	27	8	+19	19	Play-offs	—	2–0	2–4	2–0	7–0
2	Turkey	8	5	0	3	13	7	+6	15		0–2	—	1–0	2–1	6–1
3	Republic of Ireland	8	4	1	3	15	10	+5	13		2–2	0–1	—	2–1	2–0
4	Hungary	8	4	0	4	11	10	+1	12		0–3	1–0	2–1	—	2–0
5	Liechtenstein	8	0	0	8	4	35	−31	0		2–7	0–3	1–4	0–4	—

== Results and fixtures ==
25 March 2011
16:30

Turkey	6–1	Liechtenstein
Kuçik 15'; Aygüneş 28'; Aziz 41'; Çolak 55' (pen.); Çek 69'; Yılmaz 84'	Report	Kieber 60'

4 Eylül, Sivas
Referee: István Kovács (Romania)

1 September 2011
20:30

Republic of Ireland	2–1	Hungary
Brady 15'; Murphy 69'	Report	Futács 38'

Showgrounds, Sligo
Referee: Sébastien Delferière (Belgium)
2 September 2011
19:30

Liechtenstein	0–3	Turkey
	Report	Demir 30'; Kaplan 56'; Uludağ 90+3'

Rheinpark Stadion, Vaduz
Referee: Nerijus Dunauskas (Lithuania)

6 September 2011
17:00

Hungary	0–3	Italy
	Report	Gabbiadini 46', 66'; Borini 82'

Sóstói Stadion, Székesfehérvár
Referee: Artur Soares Dias (Portugal)
6 September 2011
18:00

Turkey	1–0	Republic of Ireland
Aygüneş 10'	Report

Atatürk Stadium, Denizli
Referee: Paolo Mazzoleni (Italy)

6 October 2011
17:00

Liechtenstein	2–7	Italy
Eberle 8'; Kieber 64'	Report	Rossi 29'; Gabbiadini 36', 45', 55'; Florenzi 50'; Insigne 77', 89'

Rheinpark Stadion, Vaduz
Referee: Elmir Pilav (Bosnia and Herzegovina)
8 October 2011
18:00

Turkey	2–1	Hungary
Szokol 18' (o.g.); Potuk 64'	Report	Gosztonyi 53'

Kasımpaşa Stadium, Istanbul
Referee: Szymon Marciniak (Poland)

11 October 2011
17:00

Italy	2–0	Turkey
Saponara 45'; Destro 51'	Report

Stadio Centro d'Italia - Manlio Scopigno, Rieti
Referee: Sergei Karasev (Russia)
11 October 2011
17:00

Liechtenstein	1–4	Republic of Ireland
Pirker 14'	Report	Collins 26', 30', 33'; Duffy 39'

Sportpark Eschen-Mauren, Eschen
Referee: Nikola Dabanović (Montenegro)

10 November 2011
17:00

Turkey	0–2	Italy
	Report	Destro 49', 90'

Kasımpaşa Stadium, Istanbul
Referee: Stuart Attwell (England)

14 November 2011
20:30

Republic of Ireland	2–0	Liechtenstein
Brady 13' (pen.); White 37'	Report

Showgrounds, Sligo
Referee: Bardhyl Pashaj (Albania)
15 November 2011
17:00

Italy	2–0	Hungary
Gabbiadini 20'; Paloschi 79'	Report

Stadio Giuseppe Capozza, Casarano
Referee: Kristo Tohver (Estonia)

1 June 2012
17:00

Hungary	1–0	Turkey
Gosztonyi 81'	Report

Sóstói Stadion, Székesfehérvár
Referee: Vlado Glođović (Serbia)

4 June 2012
16:00

Republic of Ireland	2–2	Italy
Brady 67' (pen.); Cunningham 71'	Report	Duffy 3' (o.g.); Immobile 56'

Showgrounds, Sligo
Referee: Eli Hacmon (Israel)
5 June 2012
19:00

Liechtenstein	0–4	Hungary
	Report	Beliczky 8', 10'; Kálnoki-Kis 13'; Iszlai 90'

Sportpark Eschen-Mauren, Eschen
Referee: Sven Bindels (Luxembourg)

14 August 2012
20:30

Republic of Ireland	0–1	Turkey
	Report	Özyakup 84'

Showgrounds, Sligo
Referee: Kristo Tohver (Estonia)

6 September 2012
17:00

Italy	7–0	Liechtenstein
De Luca 8', 39'; Immobile 28'; El Shaarawy 44', 54'; Viviani 45+1'; Sala 80' (pen.)	Report

Stadio Giuseppe Capozza, Casarano
Referee: Vasilis Dimitriou (Cyprus)
6 September 2012
17:00

Hungary	2–1	Republic of Ireland
Futács 15'; Kovács 28'	Report	Brady 40' (pen.)

Széktói Stadion, Kecskemét
Referee: Ivaylo Stoyanov (Bulgaria)

10 September 2012
18:30

Hungary	2–0	Liechtenstein
Fiola 39'; Balogh 90'	Report

Széktói Stadion, Kecskemét
Referee: Leonardo Guidi (San Marino)
10 September 2012
18:30

Italy	2–4	Republic of Ireland
Caldirola 35'; El Shaarawy 89'	Report	Murray 23'; Doran 57', 76'; Henderson 59'

Stadio Giuseppe Capozza, Casarano
Referee: Ivan Kružliak (Slovakia)

== Goalscorers ==
6 goals

- (Italy) Manolo Gabbiadini

4 goals

- (Republic of Ireland) Robbie Brady

3 goals

- (Italy) Stephan El Shaarawy
- (Italy) Mattia Destro
- (Republic of Ireland) James Collins

2 goals

- (Hungary) Gergő Beliczky
- (Hungary) Márkó Futács
- (Hungary) András Gosztonyi
- (Italy) Giuseppe De Luca
- (Italy) Ciro Immobile
- (Italy) Lorenzo Insigne
- (Liechtenstein) Niklas Kieber
- (Republic of Ireland) Aaron Doran
- (Turkey) Şahin Aygüneş

1 goal

- (Hungary) Balázs Balogh
- (Hungary) Attila Fiola
- (Hungary) Bence Iszlai
- (Hungary) Dávid Kálnoki-Kis
- (Hungary) István Kovács
- (Italy) Fabio Borini
- (Italy) Luca Caldirola
- (Italy) Alessandro Florenzi
- (Italy) Alberto Paloschi
- (Italy) Fausto Rossi
- (Italy) Jacopo Sala
- (Italy) Riccardo Saponara
- (Italy) Federico Viviani
- (Liechtenstein) Fabian Eberle
- (Liechtenstein) Simon Pirker
- (Republic of Ireland) Greg Cunningham
- (Republic of Ireland) Shane Duffy
- (Republic of Ireland) Conor Henderson
- (Republic of Ireland) Rhys Murphy
- (Republic of Ireland) Sean Murray
- (Republic of Ireland) Aidan White
- (Turkey) Serdar Aziz
- (Turkey) Özgür Çek
- (Turkey) Emre Çolak
- (Turkey) Muhammet Demir
- (Turkey) Burak Kaplan
- (Turkey) Ali Kuçik
- (Turkey) Oğuzhan Özyakup
- (Turkey) Alper Potuk
- (Turkey) Alper Uludağ
- (Turkey) Savaş Yılmaz

1 own goal

- (Hungary) Zsolt Szokol (playing against Turkey)
- (Republic of Ireland) Shane Duffy (playing against Italy)
