= 2012–13 in Italian football =

Season in Italian football

Football in Italy
- Season: 2012–13

Men's football
- Serie A: Juventus
- Serie B: Sassuolo
- Coppa Italia: Lazio
- Supercoppa Italiana: Juventus

The 2012–13 season was the 111th season of competitive football in Italy.

== Promotions and relegations (pre-season) ==
Teams promoted to Serie A

- Pescara
- Torino
- Sampdoria

Teams relegated from Serie A

- Lecce
- Novara
- Cesena

Teams promoted to Serie B

- Ternana
- Pro Vercelli
- Spezia
- Virtus Lanciano

Teams relegated from Serie B

- Vicenza
- Nocerina
- Gubbio
- AlbinoLeffe

== Honours ==
Trophy & League Champions

Competition	Winner	Details	Stadium Location	Date	Match Report
Supercoppa Italiana	Juventus	2012 Supercoppa Italiana beat Napoli 4 – 2 (a.e.t.)	Beijing National Stadium; Beijing, China	11 August 2012	Report
Serie A	Juventus	2012–13 Serie A			
Coppa Italia	Lazio	2012–13 Coppa Italia beat Roma 1 – 0	Stadio Olimpico; Rome, Italy	26 May 2013	
Serie B	Sassuolo	2012–13 Serie B			
Supercoppa di Lega di Prima Divisione	Avellino	2013 Supercoppa di Lega di Prima Divisione beat Trapani 3–3 on aggregate (away goals)		23 May 2013	
Supercoppa di Lega di Seconda Divisione	Salernitana	2013 Supercoppa di Lega di Seconda Divisione beat Pro Patria 5–1 on aggregate		25 May 2013	
Coppa Italia Lega Pro	Latina	2012–13 Coppa Italia Lega Pro	Stadio Domenico Francioni; Latina	24 April 2013	

Promotion Winners

Competition	Winner	Details
Serie B	Verona	2nd
Lega Pro Prima Divisione	Trapani	Winner Group A
Lega Pro Seconda Divisione		Winner Girone A/B
Lega Pro Seconda Divisione	Savona	2nd in Girone A
Lega Pro Seconda Divisione	Pontedera	2nd in Girone B

Playoff Winners

Competition	Winner	Details
Serie B		2012–13 Serie B
Lega Pro Prima Divisione		Girone A
Lega Pro Prima Divisione		Girone B
Lega Pro Seconda Divisione		Girone A
Lega Pro Seconda Divisione		Girone B

== National teams ==
=== Italy national football team ===
==== Euro 2012 ====
===== Group stage =====
Pos	Team	Pld	W	D	L	GF	GA	GD	Pts	Qualification
1	Spain	3	2	1	0	6	1	+5	7	Advance to knockout stage
2	Italy	3	1	2	0	4	2	+2	5	Advance to knockout stage
3	Croatia	3	1	1	1	4	3	+1	4	
4	Republic of Ireland	3	0	0	3	1	9	−8	0	

Source: UEFA
Rules for classification: Group stage tiebreakers

10 June 2012 UEFA Euro 2012	Spain	1–1	Italy	Gdańsk, Poland
18:00 CEST (UTC+02:00)	Di Natale 61'	Report	Fàbregas 64'	Stadium: PGE Arena Gdańsk; Attendance: 38,869; Referee: Viktor Kassai (Hungary)

14 June 2012 UEFA Euro 2012	Italy	1–1	Croatia	Poznań, Poland
18:00 CEST (UTC+02:00)	Pirlo 39'	Report	Mandžukić 72'	Stadium: Municipal Stadium; Attendance: 37,096; Referee: Howard Webb (England)

18 June 2012 UEFA Euro 2012	Italy	2–0	Republic of Ireland	Poznań, Poland
20:45 CEST (UTC+02:00)	Federico Balzaretti (yellow card) 28'; Cassano 35'; De Rossi (yellow card) 71'; Buffon (yellow card) 73'; Balotelli 90'	Report	Andrews (yellow card) 37' (yellow-red card) 89'; O'Shea (yellow card) 39'; St Ledger (yellow card) 84'	Stadium: Municipal Stadium; Attendance: 37,096; Referee: Cüneyt Çakır (Turkey)

===== Quarter-final =====
24 June 2012 UEFA Euro 2012	England	0–0 (a.e.t.) (2–4 p)	Italy	Kyiv, Ukraine
21:45 EEST (UTC+03:00)		Report		Stadium: Olympic Stadium; Attendance: 64,340; Referee: Pedro Proença (Portugal)
	Penalties
	Gerrard (penalty scored); Rooney (penalty scored); Young (penalty missed); Cole (penalty missed)		(penalty scored) Balotelli; (penalty missed) Montolivo; (penalty scored) Pirlo; (penalty scored) Nocerino; (penalty scored) Diamanti

===== Semi-final =====
28 June 2012 UEFA Euro 2012	Germany	1–2	Italy	Warsaw, Poland
20:45 CEST (UTC+02:00)	Özil 90+2' (pen.)	Report	Balotelli 20', 36'	Stadium: National Stadium; Attendance: 55,540; Referee: Stéphane Lannoy (France)

===== Final =====
1 July 2012 UEFA Euro 2012	Spain	4–0	Italy	Kyiv, Ukraine
21:45 EEST (UTC+03:00)	Silva 14'; Alba 41'; Torres 84'; Mata 88'	Report		Stadium: Olympic Stadium; Attendance: 63,170; Referee: Pedro Proença (Portugal)

==== 2014 FIFA World Cup qualification ====
Pos	Team	Pld	W	D	L	GF	GA	GD	Pts	Qualification	Italy national football team	Denmark national football team	Czech Republic national football team	Bulgaria national football team	Armenia national football team	Malta national football team
1	Italy	10	6	4	0	19	9	+10	22	Qualification to 2014 FIFA World Cup	—	3–1	2–1	1–0	2–2	2–0
2	Denmark	10	4	4	2	17	12	+5	16		2–2	—	0–0	1–1	0–4	6–0
3	Czech Republic	10	4	3	3	13	9	+4	15		0–0	0–3	—	0–0	1–2	3–1
4	Bulgaria	10	3	4	3	14	9	+5	13		2–2	1–1	0–1	—	1–0	6–0
5	Armenia	10	4	1	5	12	13	−1	13		1–3	0–1	0–3	2–1	—	0–1
6	Malta	10	1	0	9	5	28	−23	3		0–2	1–2	1–4	1–2	0–1	—

7 September 2012 Matchday 1	Bulgaria	2 – 2	Italy	Vasil Levski National Stadium, Sofia
21:45 UTC+3	Manolev 30'; G. Milanov 66'	Report	Osvaldo 36', 40'	Referee: Martin Atkinson (England)

11 September 2012 Matchday 2	Italy	2 – 0	Malta	Stadio Alberto Braglia, Modena
20:45 UTC+2	Destro 5'; Peluso 90+2'	Report		Attendance: 18,000; Referee: Antti Munukka (Finland)

12 October 2012 Matchday 3	Armenia	1 – 3	Italy	Hrazdan Stadium, Yerevan
21:00 UTC+4	Mkhitaryan 28'	Report	Pirlo 11' (pen.); De Rossi 64'; Osvaldo 82'	Attendance: 32,000; Referee: Marijo Strahonja (Croatia)

16 October 2012 Matchday 4	Italy	3 – 1	Denmark	Stadio Giuseppe Meazza, Milan
20:45 UTC+2	Montolivo 33'; De Rossi 37'; Balotelli 54'	Report	Kvist 45+1'	Referee: Damir Skomina (Slovenia)

26 March 2013 Matchday 5	Malta	0 – 2	Italy	National Stadium, Ta' Qali
19:45 GMT			Balotelli 8' (pen.), 45'	Referee: Serdar Gözübüyük (Netherlands)

==== Friendlies ====
15 August 2012	Italy	1 – 2	England	Stade de Suisse, Bern
20:00 BST	De Rossi 15'	Report	Jagielka 28'; Defoe 80'	Attendance: 15,000; Referee: Sascha Kever

14 November 2012	Italy	1 – 2	France	Stadio Ennio Tardini, Parma
20:50 CET	El Shaarawy 35'	Report	Valbuena 37'; Gomis 67'	Attendance: 20,000; Referee: Alberto Undiano Mallenco (Spain)

6 February 2013	Netherlands	1 – 1	Italy	Amsterdam Arena, Amsterdam
14:20 CET	Lens 33'		Verratti 90'	Attendance: 45,000; Referee: Cüneyt Çakır (Turkey)

=== Italy national under-21 football team ===
2013 UEFA European Under-21 Football Championship qualification Group 7

Pos	Team	Pld	W	D	L	GF	GA	GD	Pts	Qualification
1	Italy	8	6	1	1	27	8	+19	19	Play-offs
2	Turkey	8	5	0	3	13	7	+6	15	
3	Republic of Ireland	8	4	1	3	15	10	+5	13	
4	Hungary	8	4	0	4	11	10	+1	12	
5	Liechtenstein	8	0	0	8	4	35	−31	0	

Date	Opponent	Venue	Result	Scorers	Attendance
6 Sep 2012 – 17:00	Liechtenstein	Stadio Giuseppe Capozza, Casarano	7 – 0	De Luca 8', 39'; Immobile 28'; El Shaarawy 44', 54'; Viviani 45+1'; Sala 80' (pen.)	
10 Sep 2012 – 18:30	Republic of Ireland	Stadio Giuseppe Capozza, Casarano	2 – 4	Caldirola 35'; El Shaarawy 89'	

Play-offs

Date	Opponent	Venue	Result	Scorers	Attendance
12 Oct 2012 – 21:00	Sweden	Stadio Adriatico, Pescara	1 – 0	Immobile 17'	
16 Oct 2012 – 18:00	Sweden	Guldfågeln Arena, Kalmar	3 – 2	Insigne 68'; Florenzi 73'; Immobile 86'	

2013 UEFA European Under-21 Championship

The draw will take place in Israel at 28 November 2012. Italy is in Pot 3 with Germany, Russia and Norway; in Pot 1 there is Israel (assign to A1) and Spain (assign to B1) and in Pot 2 there is England and Netherlands.

Group A
Pos	Team	Pld	W	D	L	GF	GA	GD	Pts	Group stage result
1	Italy	3	2	1	0	6	1	+5	7	Advance to knockout stage
2	Norway	3	1	2	0	6	4	+2	5	Advance to knockout stage
3	Israel (H)	3	1	1	1	3	6	−3	4	
4	England	3	0	0	3	1	5	−4	0	

(H) Hosts
5 June 2013
21:30

England	0–1	Italy
		Insigne 79'

Bloomfield Stadium, Tel Aviv
Attendance: 10,660
Referee: Antony Gautier (France)
8 June 2013
21:30

Italy	4–0	Israel
Saponara 18'; Gabbiadini 42', 53'; Florenzi 71'

Bloomfield Stadium, Tel Aviv
Attendance: 13,750
Referee: Ovidiu Hațegan (Romania)
11 June 2013
19:00

Norway	1–1	Italy
Strandberg 90'		Bertolacci 90'

Bloomfield Stadium, Tel Aviv
Referee: Ivan Bebek (Croatia)

15 June 2013
21:30

Italy	1–0	Netherlands
Borini 79'	Report

HaMoshava Stadium, Petah Tikva
Attendance: 10,123
Referee: Ovidiu Haţegan (Romania)

18 June 2013
19:00

Spain	4–2	Italy
Thiago 6', 31', 38' (pen.); Isco 66' (pen.)	Report	Immobile 10'; Borini 80'

Teddy Stadium, Jerusalem
Attendance: 29,300
Referee: Matej Jug (Slovenia)

=== Italy women's national football team ===
==== UEFA Women's Euro 2013 qualifying ====
Team	Pld	W	D	L	GF	GA	GD	Pts
Italy	10	9	1	0	35	0	+35	28
Russia	10	7	1	2	31	6	+25	22
Poland	10	5	2	3	17	11	+6	17
Bosnia and Herzegovina	10	3	1	6	12	21	−9	10
Greece	10	0	5	5	7	20	−13	5
Macedonia	10	0	2	8	5	49	−44	2

Source: UEFA.com

Date	Opponent	Venue	Result	Scorers	Attendance
16 Sep 2012 – 15:00	Poland	Stadio Riviera delle Palme, San Benedetto del Tronto	1 – 0	Panico 86'	390
19 Sep 2012 – 16:00	Greece	Nea Smyrni Stadium, Athens	0 – 0		223

==== UEFA Women's Euro 2013 ====
The final draw took place on 9 November 2012 at the Swedish Exhibition & Congress Centre in Gothenburg. Italy is in Pot 2 with England and Norway.

Group A

Pos	Team	Pld	W	D	L	GF	GA	GD	Pts	Qualification
1	Sweden (H)	3	2	1	0	9	2	+7	7	Advance to knockout stage
2	Italy	3	1	1	1	3	4	−1	4	Advance to knockout stage
3	Denmark	3	0	2	1	3	4	−1	2	Advance to knockout stage
4	Finland	3	0	2	1	1	6	−5	2	

Source: UEFA.com
(H) Hosts
10 July 2013
18:00

Italy	0–0	Finland

Örjans Vall, Halmstad
Attendance: 3,011
Referee: Teodora Albon (Romania)
13 July 2013
18:00

Italy	1–2	Denmark
Gabbiadini 55'; Mauro 60'		Brogaard 66'

Örjans Vall, Halmstad
Attendance: 2,190
Referee: Esther Staubli (Switzerland)
16 July 2013
20:30

Sweden	3–1	Italy
Manieri 47' (o.g.); Schelin 49'; Öqvist 57'		Gabbiadini 78'

Örjans Vall, Halmstad
Attendance: 7,288
Referee: Katalin Kulcsár (Hungry)

21 July 2013
18:00

Italy	0–1	Germany
	Report	Laudehr 26'

Myresjöhus Arena, Växjö
Attendance: 9,265
Referee: Katalin Kulcsár (Hungary)

== League table ==
=== Serie A ===
Pos	Team	Pld	W	D	L	GF	GA	GD	Pts	Qualification or relegation
1	Juventus (C)	38	27	6	5	71	24	+47	87	Qualification for the Champions League group stage
2	Napoli	38	23	9	6	73	36	+37	78	Qualification for the Champions League group stage
3	Milan	38	21	9	8	67	39	+28	72	Qualification for the Champions League play-off round
4	Fiorentina	38	21	7	10	72	44	+28	70	Qualification for the Europa League play-off round
5	Udinese	38	18	12	8	59	45	+14	66	Qualification for the Europa League third qualifying round
6	Roma	38	18	8	12	71	56	+15	62	
7	Lazio	38	18	7	13	51	42	+9	61	Qualification for the Europa League group stage (Note: Lazio qualified for the 2013–14 UEFA Europa League group stage after winning 2012–13 Coppa Italia.)
8	Catania	38	15	11	12	50	46	+4	56	
9	Inter Milan	38	16	6	16	55	57	−2	54	
10	Parma	38	13	10	15	45	46	−1	49	
11	Cagliari	38	12	11	15	43	55	−12	47	
12	Chievo	38	12	9	17	37	52	−15	45	
13	Bologna	38	11	11	16	46	52	−6	44	
14	Sampdoria	38	11	10	17	43	51	−8	42 (Note: Sampdoria and Torino were docked 1 point due to involvement in the 2011–12 Italian football scandal.)	
15	Atalanta	38	11	9	18	39	56	−17	40 (Note: Atalanta was docked 2 points due to involvement in the 2011–12 Italian football scandal.)	
16	Torino	38	8	16	14	46	55	−9	39	
17	Genoa	38	8	14	16	38	52	−14	38	
18	Palermo (R)	38	6	14	18	34	54	−20	32	Relegation to Serie B
19	Siena (R)	38	9	9	20	36	57	−21	30 (Note: Siena was docked 6 points due to involvement in the 2011–12 Italian football scandal.)	Relegation to Serie B
20	Pescara (R)	38	6	4	28	27	84	−57	22	Relegation to Serie B

Source: Serie A, Soccerway
Rules for classification: 1st points; 2nd head-to-head points; 3rd head-to-head goal difference; 4th goal difference; 5th number of goals scored; 6th public draw.
(Head-to-head record is applied for clubs with the same number of points only once all matches between said clubs have been played)
(C) Champions; (R) Relegated

=== Serie B ===
Pos	Team	Pld	W	D	L	GF	GA	GD	Pts	Promotion or relegation
1	Sassuolo (C, P)	42	25	10	7	78	40	+38	85	Promotion to Serie A
2	Hellas Verona (P)	42	23	13	6	67	32	+35	82	Promotion to Serie A
3	Livorno (O, P)	42	23	11	8	77	47	+30	80	Qualification to promotion play-offs
4	Empoli	42	20	13	9	69	51	+18	73	Qualification to promotion play-offs
5	Novara (Note: Novara was docked 3 points due to the 2011 Italian football scandal.)	42	19	10	13	73	46	+27	64	Qualification to promotion play-offs
6	Brescia	42	15	17	10	58	50	+8	62	Qualification to promotion play-offs
7	Varese (Note: Ascoli and Varese were docked 1 point due to the 2011 Italian football scandal.)	42	16	13	13	55	53	+2	60	
8	Modena (Note: Modena and Reggina were docked 2 points due to the 2011 Italian football scandal.)	42	15	12	15	52	51	+1	55	
9	Ternana	42	12	17	13	37	38	−1	53 (Note: TER: 11pts; BAR: 10pts; PAD: 8pts; CRO: 2pts)	
10	Bari (Note: Bari was docked 7 points: 2 points due to financial irregularities and 5 points due to the 2011 Italian football scandal.)	42	16	12	14	55	47	+8	53	
11	Padova	42	12	17	13	47	51	−4	53	
12	Crotone (Note: Crotone was docked 2 points due to financial irregularities.)	42	14	13	15	45	56	−11	53	
13	Spezia	42	12	15	15	52	58	−6	51	
14	Cesena	42	12	14	16	46	58	−12	50 (Note: CES: 8pts; CIT: 5pts; JST: 2pts)	
15	Cittadella	42	12	14	16	48	61	−13	50	
16	Juve Stabia	42	12	14	16	54	65	−11	50	
17	Reggina	42	12	15	15	42	51	−9	49	
18	Virtus Lanciano (Note: No relegation playoffs will be held as Virtus Lanciano is more than 4 points clear of 4th-last place.)	42	9	21	12	50	60	−10	48	
19	Vicenza (R)	42	10	12	20	41	58	−17	42	Relegation to Lega Pro Prima Divisione
20	Ascoli (R)	42	11	9	22	48	67	−19	41	Relegation to Lega Pro Prima Divisione
21	Pro Vercelli (R)	42	8	9	25	37	67	−30	33	Relegation to Lega Pro Prima Divisione
22	Grosseto (R)	42	7	13	22	44	72	−28	28 (Note: Grosseto was docked 6 points due to the 2011 Italian football scandal.)	Relegation to Lega Pro Prima Divisione

Source: Serie B
Rules for classification: 1) points; 2) head-to-head points; 3) head-to-head goal difference; 4) head-to-head goals scored; 5) goal difference; 6) number of goals scored.
(C) Champions; (O) Play-off winners; (P) Promoted; (R) Relegated

== Italian clubs in international competitions ==
=== Juventus ===
2012–13 UEFA Champions League group stage

Pos	Team	Pld	W	D	L	GF	GA	GD	Pts	Qualification	JUV	SHK	CHE	NOR
1	(Italy) Juventus	6	3	3	0	12	4	+8	12	Advance to knockout phase	—	1–1	3–0	4–0
2	(Ukraine) Shakhtar Donetsk	6	3	1	2	12	8	+4	10 (Note: Tied on head-to-head points (3) and head-to-head goal difference (0). Head-to-head away goals: Shakhtar Donetsk 2, Chelsea 1.)	Advance to knockout phase	0–1	—	2–1	2–0
3	(England) Chelsea	6	3	1	2	16	10	+6	10	Transfer to Europa League	2–2	3–2	—	6–1
4	(Denmark) Nordsjælland	6	0	1	5	4	22	−18	1		1–1	2–5	0–4	—

Source: Soccerway
Notes:

Date	Opponent	H/A	Result	Scorers	Attendance
19 Sep 2012 – 20:45	(England) Chelsea	A	2 – 2	Vidal 38'; Quagliarella 80'	40,918
2 Oct 2012 – 20:45	(Ukraine) Shakhtar Donetsk	H	1 – 1	Bonucci 25'	29,368
23 Oct 2012 – 20:45	(Denmark) Nordsjælland	A	1 – 1	Vučinić 81'	22,404
7 Nov 2012 – 20:45	(Denmark) Nordsjælland	H	4 – 0		
20 Nov 2012 – 20:45	(England) Chelsea	H	3 – 0		
5 Dec 2012 – 20:45	(Ukraine) Shakhtar Donetsk	A	0 – 1		
12 Feb 2013 – 20:45	(Scotland) Celtic	A	0 – 3		
6 Mar 2013 – 20:45	(Scotland) Celtic	H	2 – 0		

=== Milan ===
2012–13 UEFA Champions League group stage

Pos	Team	Pld	W	D	L	GF	GA	GD	Pts	Qualification	MLG	MIL	ZEN	AND
1	(Spain) Málaga	6	3	3	0	12	5	+7	12	Advance to knockout phase	—	1–0	3–0	2–2
2	(Italy) Milan	6	2	2	2	7	6	+1	8	Advance to knockout phase	1–1	—	0–1	0–0
3	(Russia) Zenit Saint Petersburg	6	2	1	3	6	9	−3	7	Transfer to Europa League	2–2	2–3	—	1–0
4	(Belgium) Anderlecht	6	1	2	3	4	9	−5	5		0–3	1–3	1–0	—

Source: Soccerway

Date	Opponent	H/A	Result	Scorers	Attendance
18 Sep 2012 – 20:45	(Belgium) Anderlecht	H	0 – 0		27,593
3 Oct 2012 – 18:00	(Russia) Zenit St. Petersburg	A	3 – 2	Emanuelson 13'; El Shaarawy 16'; Hubočan 75' (o.g.)	21,703
24 Oct 2012 – 20:45	(Spain) Málaga	A	0 – 1		27,683
6 Nov 2012 – 20:45	(Spain) Málaga	H	–		
21 Nov 2012 – 20:45	(Belgium) Anderlecht	A	–		
4 Dec 2012 – 20:45	(Russia) Zenit St. Petersburg	H	–		

=== Udinese ===
2012–13 UEFA Europa League qualifying phase

Date	Round	Opponent	H/A	Result	Scorers	Attendance
22 Aug 2012 – 20:45	Play-off; First Leg	(Portugal) Braga	A	1 – 1	Basta 23'	13,520
28 Aug 2012 – 18:00	Play-off; Second Leg	(Portugal) Braga	H	1 – 1 (4 – 5 p)	Armero 25'	19,560

2012–13 UEFA Europa League group stage

Pos	Team	Pld	W	D	L	GF	GA	GD	Pts	Qualification	LIV	ANZ	YB	UDI
1	(England) Liverpool	6	3	1	2	11	9	+2	10 (Note: Head-to-head points: Liverpool 7, Anzhi Makhachkala 6, Young Boys 4.)	Advance to knockout phase	—	1–0	2–2	2–3
2	(Russia) Anzhi Makhachkala	6	3	1	2	7	5	+2	10	Advance to knockout phase	1–0	—	2–0	2–0
3	(Switzerland) Young Boys	6	3	1	2	14	13	+1	10		3–5	3–1	—	3–1
4	(Italy) Udinese	6	1	1	4	7	12	−5	4		0–1	1–1	2–3	—

Source: Soccerway
Notes:

Date	Opponent	H/A	Result	Scorers	Attendance
20 Sep 2012 – 19:00	(Russia) Anzhi Makhachkala	H	1 – 1	Di Natale 90+2'	7,220
4 Oct 2012 – 21:05	(England) Liverpool	A	3 – 2	Di Natale 46'; Coates 70' (o.g.); Pasquale 72'	40,092
25 Oct 2012 – 21:05	(Switzerland) Young Boys	A	1 – 2	Coda 74'	20,143
8 Nov 2012 – 19:00	(Switzerland) Young Boys	H	2 – 3	Di Natale 47', Fabbrini 83'	
22 Nov 2012 – 18:00	(Russia) Anzhi Makhachkala	A	2 – 0		8,556
6 Dec 2012 – 19:00	(England) Liverpool	H	0 – 1		12,000

=== Napoli ===
2012–13 UEFA Europa League group stage

Pos	Team	Pld	W	D	L	GF	GA	GD	Pts	Qualification	DNI	NAP	PSV	AIK
1	(Ukraine) Dnipro Dnipropetrovsk	6	5	0	1	16	8	+8	15	Advance to knockout phase	—	3–1	2–0	4–0
2	(Italy) Napoli	6	3	0	3	12	12	0	9	Advance to knockout phase	4–2	—	1–3	4–0
3	(Netherlands) PSV Eindhoven	6	2	1	3	8	7	+1	7		1–2	3–0	—	1–1
4	(Sweden) AIK	6	1	1	4	5	14	−9	4		2–3	1–2	1–0	—

Source: Soccerway

Date	Opponent	H/A	Result	Scorers	Attendance
20 Sep 2012 – 19:00	(Sweden) AIK	H	4 – 0	Vargas 6', 46', 69'; Džemaili 90+1'	35,000
4 Oct 2012 – 21:05	(Netherlands) PSV Eindhoven	A	0 – 3		18,200
25 Oct 2012 – 21:05	(Ukraine) Dnipro Dnipropetrovsk	A	1 – 3	Cavani 75' (pen.)	29,000
8 Nov 2012 – 19:00	(Ukraine) Dnipro Dnipropetrovsk	H	4 – 2	Cavani 7', 77', 88', 90'	35,000
22 Nov 2012 – 21:05	(Sweden) AIK	A	1 – 2	Džemaili 20'; Cavani 90' (pen.)	9,434
6 Dec 2012 – 19:00	(Netherlands) PSV Eindhoven	H	1 – 3	Cavani 18'	9,434

=== Lazio ===
2012–13 UEFA Europa League qualifying phase

Date	Round	Opponent	H/A	Result	Scorers	Attendance
23 Aug 2012 – 21:00	Play-off; First Leg	(Slovenia) Mura 05	A	2 – 0	Hernanes 31'; Klose 59'	4,200
28 Aug 2012 – 18:00	Play-off; Second Leg	(Slovenia) Mura 05	H	3 – 1	Kozák 30', 55'; Zárate 42'	12,138

2012–13 UEFA Europa League group stage

Pos	Team	Pld	W	D	L	GF	GA	GD	Pts	Qualification	LAZ	TOT	PAN	MRB
1	(Italy) Lazio	6	3	3	0	9	2	+7	12	Advance to knockout phase	—	0–0	3–0	1–0
2	(England) Tottenham Hotspur	6	2	4	0	8	4	+4	10	Advance to knockout phase	0–0	—	3–1	3–1
3	(Greece) Panathinaikos	6	1	2	3	4	11	−7	5		1–1	1–1	—	1–0
4	(Slovenia) Maribor	6	1	1	4	6	10	−4	4		1–4	1–1	3–0	—

Source: Soccerway

Date	Opponent	H/A	Result	Scorers	Attendance
20 Sep 2012 – 21:05	(England) Tottenham Hotspur	A	0 – 0		25,030
4 Oct 2012 – 19:00	(Slovenia) Maribor	H	1 – 0	Ederson 62'	10,000
25 Oct 2012 – 19:00	(Greece) Panathinaikos	A	1 – 1	Seitaridis 25' (o.g.)	17,000
8 Nov 2012 – 21:05	(Greece) Panathinaikos	H	3 – 0	Kozák 23', 40'; Floccari 59'	9,086
22 Nov 2012 – 19:00	(England) Tottenham Hotspur	H	0 – 0		23,318
6 Dec 2012 – 21:05	(Slovenia) Maribor	A	4 – 1	Kozák 16'; Radu 32'; Floccari 38', 51'	10,300

=== Internazionale ===
2012–13 UEFA Europa League qualifying phase

Date	Round	Opponent	H/A	Result	Scorers	Attendance
2 Aug 2012 – 20:45	Third round First Leg	(Croatia) Hajduk Split	A	3 – 0	Sneijder 18'; Nagatomo 44'; Coutinho 73'	35,000
9 Aug 2012 – 20:45	Third round Second Leg	(Croatia) Hajduk Split	H	0 – 2		44,154
23 Aug 2012 – 20:45	Play-off; First Leg	(Romania) Vaslui	A	2 – 0	Cambiasso 23'; Palacio 73'	13,500
28 Aug 2012 – 20:45	Play-off; Second Leg	(Romania) Vaslui	H	2 – 2	Palacio 76'; Guarín 90+2'	41,326

2012–13 UEFA Europa League group stage

Pos	Team	Pld	W	D	L	GF	GA	GD	Pts	Qualification	RUB	INT	PAR	NEF
1	(Russia) Rubin Kazan	6	4	2	0	10	3	+7	14	Advance to knockout phase	—	3–0	2–0	1–0
2	(Italy) Internazionale	6	3	2	1	11	9	+2	11	Advance to knockout phase	2–2	—	1–0	2–2
3	(Serbia) Partizan	6	0	3	3	3	8	−5	3 (Note: Tied on head-to-head points (2) and head-to-head goal difference (0). Head-to-head away goals: Partizan 1, Neftçi 0.)		1–1	1–3	—	0–0
4	(Azerbaijan) Neftçi	6	0	3	3	4	8	−4	3		0–1	1–3	1–1	—

Source: Soccerway
Notes:

Date	Opponent	H/A	Result	Scorers	Attendance
20 Sep 2012 – 21:05	(Russia) Rubin Kazan	H	2 – 2	Livaja 39'; Nagatomo 90+2'	28,472
4 Oct 2012 – 18:00	(Azerbaijan) Neftchi Baku	A	3 – 1	Coutinho 10'; Obi 30'; Livaja 42'	31,400
25 Oct 2012 – 19:00	(Serbia) Partizan	H	1 – 0	Palacio 88'	18,626
8 Nov 2012 – 21:05	(Serbia) Partizan	A	3 – 1	Palacio 51'; 75'; Guarín 87'	17,186
22 Nov 2012 – 18:00	(Russia) Rubin Kazan	A	0 – 3		12,348
6 Dec 2012 – 21:05	(Azerbaijan) Neftchi Baku	H	2 – 2	Livaja 9'; 54';	6,150

2012–13 UEFA Europa League knockout phase

Date	Round	Opponent	H/A	Result	Scorers	Attendance
14 Feb 2013 – 21:05	Round of 32; First Leg	(Romania) CFR Cluj	H	2 – 0	Palacio 20'; 87'	14,790
21 Feb 2013 – 19:00	Round of 32; Second Leg	(Romania) CFR Cluj	A	3 – 0	Guarín 22'; 45+2'; Benassi 89'	11,027
7 Mar 2013 – 21:05	Round of 16; First Leg	(England) Tottenham Hotspur	A	0 – 3		34,353
14 Mar 2013 – 19:00	Round of 16; Second Leg	(England) Tottenham Hotspur	H	4 – 1	Cassano 20'; Palacio 52'; Gallas 75';(o.g.) Álvarez 110'	18,241
