= Kieber =

Kieber can be the surname of

- Heinrich Kieber, tax whistleblower, whose information lead to the 2008 Liechtenstein tax affair
- Niklas Kieber (born 1993), a Liechtenstein footballer
- Rita Kieber-Beck (born 1958), was Foreign Affairs Minister of Liechtenstein
- Walter Kieber (1931–2014), Prime Minister of Liechtenstein
- Walter Kieber (mayor) (born 1954), mayor of Schellenberg
- Wolfgang Kieber (born 1984), a Liechtenstein footballer
- Joseph J. Kieber, Distinguished Professor of biology, University of North Carolina, Chapel Hill, and Member of the U.S. National Academy of Sciences
