= FV 08 Rottweil =

German sports club

- Full name: Fußball Verein 08 Rottweil e.V.
- Founded: 3 June 1908; 117 years ago
- Ground: Stadion Rottweil
- Capacity: 5000 (500 seated)
- League: Bezirksliga (VIII)
- 2021/22: 2nd
- Website: http://www.fv08-rottweil.de/

FV 08 Rottweil e.V. is a German sports club based in Rottweil, Baden-Württemberg. The team currently plays in the Bezirksliga, the eighth tier of the German football league system.

== History ==
The club was founded as 08 Rottweil on 3 June 1908 during a meeting at the Brauereigasthaus zum Pflug. In 1919 08 Rottweil and Germania Rottweil merged under the current name of FV 08 Rottweil. In June 2021 the club signed Ralf Volkwein as sports director, beating out many other clubs in the process. Volkwein was best known for his time as manager of TSG Balingen in which he was in charge of over 250 matches. However, he also played for Rottweil from 2000 and 2004, accumulating over 150 caps and 30 goals, and coached the club from 2008 to 2012.

== Stadium ==
The club plays its home matches at the Stadion Rottweil. The stadium was completed in September 1950 as part of the city's 800th anniversary. The grandstand was added five years later. Renovation of the facility began in 2018 with the work expected to be completed by 2021.

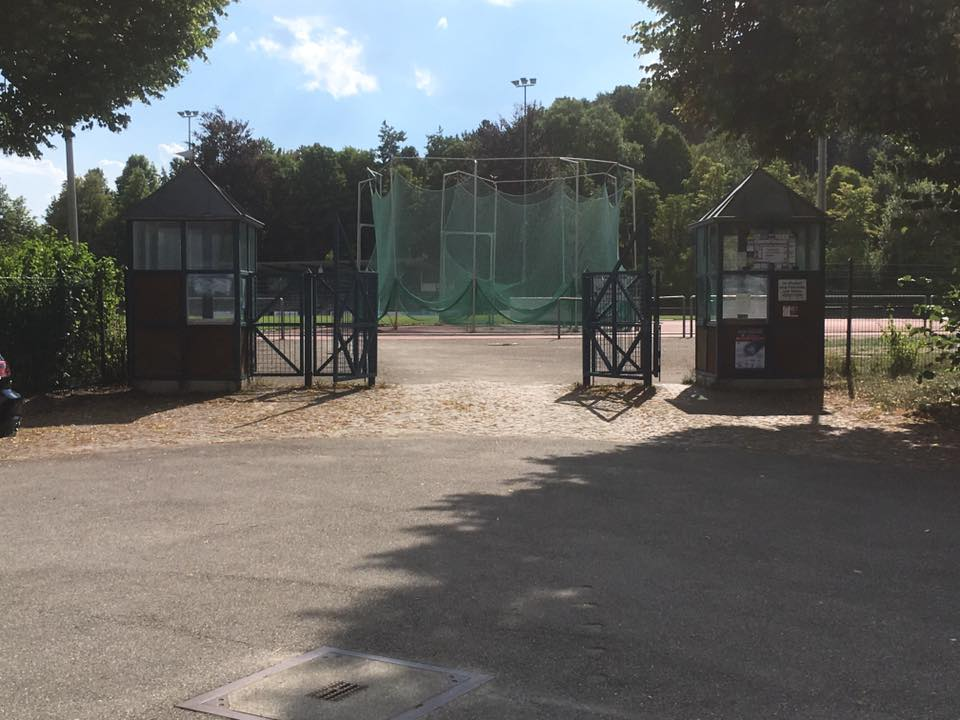
Main Entrance

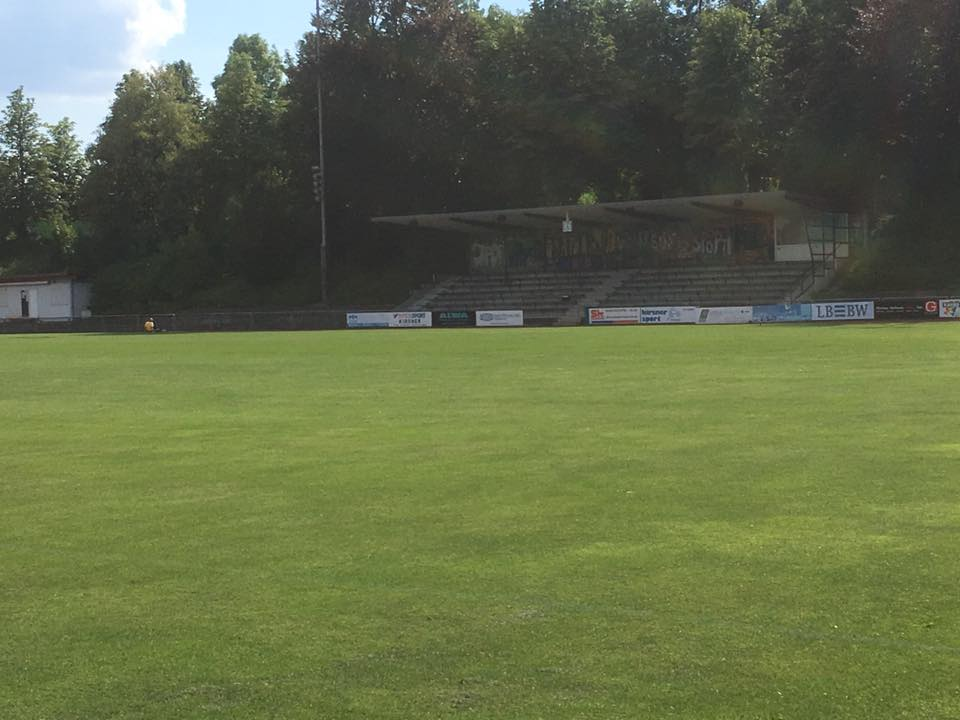
Main Stand

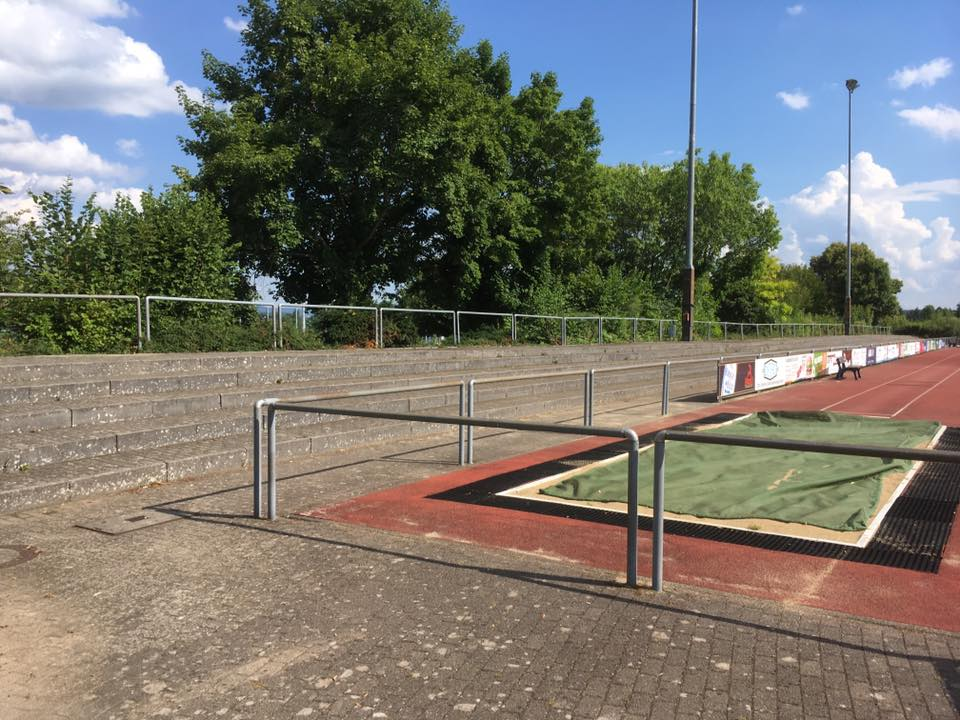
Left Seating

== Recent seasons ==
Year	Division	League	Record (W–D–L)	Points	Regular Season
2003/04	VII	Landesliga	20–8–2	68	1st ↑
2004/05	VI	Verbandsliga	8–6–16	30	13th ↓
2005/06	VII	Landesliga	17–5–10	56	5th
2006/07	VII	Landesliga	19–5–8	62	3rd
2007/08	VII	Landesliga	13–8–11	47	8th
2008/09	VII	Landesliga	13–4–13	43	6th
2009/10	VII	Landesliga	15–10–7	55	4th
2010/11	VII	Landesliga	14–9–7	51	3rd
2011/12	VII	Landesliga	11–7–12	40	10th
2012/13	VII	Landesliga	11–6–13	39	10th
2013/14	VII	Landesliga	14–3–13	45	8th
2014/15	VII	Landesliga	7–4–19	25	14th ↓
2015/16	VIII	Bezirksliga	19–4–7	61	2nd
2016/17	VIII	Bezirksliga	18–7–5	59	3rd
2017/18	VIII	Bezirksliga	19–2–7	61	2nd ↑
2018/19	VII	Landesliga	6–5–19	23	16th ↓
2019/20	VIII	Bezirksliga	3–2–12	11	13th
2020/21	VIII	Bezirksliga	2–2–5	8	14th
2021/22	VIII	Bezirksliga	19–6–5	63	2nd
2022/23	VIII	Bezirksliga	15–8–7	53	3rd
2023/24	VIII	Bezirksliga	10–6–14	36	9th
2024/25	VIII	Bezirksliga			

Key

↑ Promoted	↓ Relegated
