= Casarano Calcio =

Italian football club

Casarano
- Full name: Casarano Calcio srl
- Founded: 1927; 2006 (refounded); 2012 (refounded)
- Ground: Stadio Giuseppe Capozza, Casarano, Italy
- Capacity: 6,500
- Chairman: Antonio Filograna Sergio
- Manager: Vito Di Bari
- League: Serie C Group C
- 2025–26: Serie C Group C, 8th of 20
Home colours	Away colours

Casarano Calcio is an Italian association football club located in Casarano, Apulia. It currently plays in Serie C Group C.

== History ==
The club was founded in 1927, playing also in Serie C for 20 seasons. The club's best results occurred in the 1990s under the guidance of sporting director Pantaleo Corvino, and was also the debut team of a 16-year old Fabrizio Miccoli.

In the 2001–02 season, Mario Kempes, the world-famous Argentine striker, briefly served as head coach for the club.

The club was refounded in 2006 as A.S.D. Virtus Casarano, but in summer 2012 it does not join in Serie D, due to bankruptcy.

Immediately after on 24 July 2012, the club was again refounded by Eugenio Filograna as S.S.D. Casarano Calcio and was relocated in Promozione Apulia.

In 2025, Casarano were promoted back to Serie C after winning the Group H of the 2024–25 Serie D season.

The next season they were one of the surprise packages, finishing 8th in Girone C with an attack going forward with the league’s top scorer Cosimo Chiricó, but also subsequently having one of the worst defences in the league. They went on to have a surprising run in the playoffs, beating Monopoli 0-2, Cosenza 1-5, Renate 2-3 (agg), before eventually falling short to Union Brescia 3-0 (agg).

== Colors and badge ==
Its colours are red-azure.

== Current squad ==
As of 1 September 2026

Note: Flags indicate national team as defined under FIFA eligibility rules; some limited exceptions apply. Players may hold more than one non-FIFA nationality.

No.	Pos.	Nation	Player
1	GK	ITA	Filippo Bacchin
3	DF	ITA	Federico Giraudo
4	MF	CRO	Karlo Lulić
6	DF	MDA	Matteo Obleac
7	MF	CRO	Borna Knezović
8	MF	CAN	Antoine N'Diaye (on loan from Bologna)
9	FW	ITA	Francesco Grandolfo
10	FW	ITA	Cosimo Chiricò
11	FW	ITA	Vincenzo Ferrara
17	MF	ITA	Raffaele Maiello (Captain)
18	FW	ITA	Leonardo Pérez
21	MF	ITA	Niccolò Zanellato
22	GK	ITA	Niccolò Chiorra
23	MF	ITA	Gaetano Logoluso

No.	Pos.	Nation	Player
27	MF	ITA	Leandro Versienti
28	DF	ITA	Tiziano Lattante
29	DF	GHA	Bright Gyamfi
30	MF	ITA	Francesco Podrini
33	DF	ITA	Mario Mercadante
34	DF	ITA	Stefano Negro
37	FW	ITA	Cristian Cuzzarella
46	FW	ITA	Vito Leonetti
77	MF	ITA	Francesco Palumbo
90	FW	ITA	Cosimo Patierno
97	GK	ITA	Alessandro Farroni
—	DF	ITA	Giuseppe Albo
—	DF	ITA	Emmanuele Matino
—	FW	ITA	Diego Malagnino

=== Out on loan ===
Note: Flags indicate national team as defined under FIFA eligibility rules; some limited exceptions apply. Players may hold more than one non-FIFA nationality.

No. / Pos. / Nation / Player; — / GK / ITA / Marco Ferilli (at Siracusa until 30 June 2027)	No. / Pos. / Nation / Player; — / FW / ITA / Andrea Santarcangelo (at Caratese until 30 June 2027)

== Honours and records ==
- Coppa Italia Serie C1:
  - Champions – 1984–85
- Serie C2:
  - Champions – 1987–88
- Coppa Italia Dilettanti:
  - Champions – 2008–09, 2018–19

=== Youth Team honours ===
- Campionato nazionale Dante Berretti
  - Champions – 1996–1997

Points record for professional championships (With 2 points awarded for the win) in the 1987–88 Serie C2 Championship.

Casarano and Calcio Varese are the only clubs to have won at least one Coppa Italia Serie C and one Coppa Italia Dilettanti.
