= Martin Braun =

German football manager (born 1968)

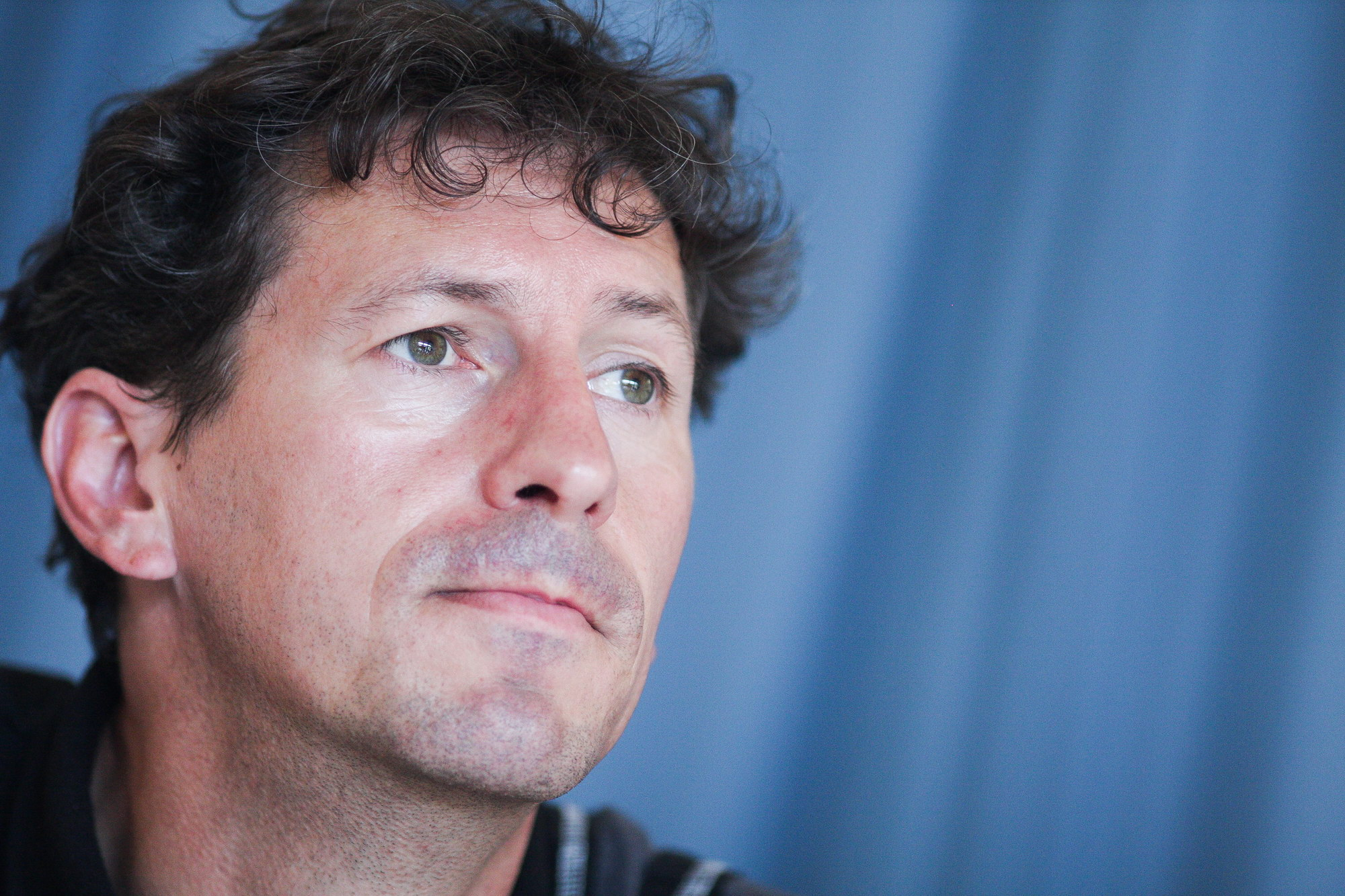
- Braun in 2011

Personal information
- Date of birth: 18 November 1968 (age 57)
- Place of birth: Löffingen, West Germany
- Height: 1.85 m (6 ft 1 in)
- Position: Midfielder

Team information
- Current team: FV Ravensburg (manager)

Senior career*
Years	Team	Apps	(Gls)
1990–1995	SC Freiburg	157	(24)
1995–1997	1. FC Köln	38	(2)
1997–1999	Rapid Wien	63	(1)
1999–2000	Karlsruher SC	23	(1)
2000–2003	VfR Aalen	68	(0)
Total		349	(28)

Managerial career
- 2010–2015: FC 08 Villingen
- 2020–2023: TSG Balingen
- 2023–: FV Ravensburg
- * Club domestic league appearances and goals

Martin Braun (born 18 November 1968) is a German professional football manager and former player who is the manager of Oberliga Baden-Württemberg club FV Ravensburg.

The midfielder had a long career in football, and retired in 2003. After his retirement from playing he worked as an agent for SC Freiburg. He had also played for 1. FC Köln, Rapid Wien, Karlsruher SC and, until the end of his career, VfR Aalen.

== Post-playing career ==
After his retirement in 2003, Braun worked as press officer at his former club SC Freiburg until December 2007.

In March 2008, Braun got the job as CEO at VfR Aalen. He left the club after just ten months.

In the summer 2010, Braun signed a contract with German club FC 08 Villingen as their new manager. He was sacked by the club on 22 April 2015.

In January 2020, Braun was appointed as the new manager of Regionalliga Südwest club TSG Balingen.
