= Francesco Grandolfo =

Italian footballer

Personal information
- Date of birth: 26 July 1992 (age 34)
- Place of birth: Castellana Grotte, Italy
- Height: 1.82 m (6 ft 0 in)
- Position: Striker

Team information
- Current team: Casarano
- Number: 9

Youth career
- Bari

Senior career*
Years	Team	Apps	(Gls)
2011–2014	Bari	9	(3)
2011–2012	→ Chievo (loan)	2	(0)
2013	→ Tritium (loan)	13	(1)
2013–2014	→ Savona (loan)	14	(1)
2014–2015	Correggese	37	(22)
2015–2016	Fidelis Andria	29	(6)
2016–2018	Bassano Virtus	45	(10)
2018–2019	Virtus Verona	35	(4)
2019–2020	Vis Pesaro	18	(2)
2020	Sambenedettese	7	(1)
2020–2021	Legnago	38	(8)
2021–2022	Monopoli	32	(8)
2022–2024	Arzignano	51	(10)
2024–2025	Monopoli	41	(10)
2025–2026	Trapani	21	(7)
2026–	Casarano	15	(4)
- * Club domestic league appearances and goals as of 1 May 2026

Francesco Grandolfo (born 26 July 1992) is an Italian professional footballer who plays as a forward for Serie C Group C club Casarano.

== Career ==
A Bari youth system trainee, he made his debut in Serie A on 7 May 2011 in an away fixture against Palermo. In his third appearance of the season, the last day of the season, he scored a hat-trick against Bologna in a match that finished 4–0 to Bari. With this feat, he became the first ever Bari player to score a hat-trick in an away game in Serie A for the club.

Later during the summer, he was loaned out to Chievo on deadline day. After mostly spending the whole season playing with the Primavera under-19 team, Grandolfo made his first team debut on 22 May 2011, in a game against Bologna when he came on as a substitute. He made only one other appearance that season and so finished the season with two appearances and zero goals. As a consequence, Chievo decided not to retain him after his loan expired and so he returned to Bari, who were now in Serie B.

In the first half of the 2012–13 Serie B season, Grandolfo made six appearances for Bari, but form evaded him and he was unable to score in any of those games. Due to lack of minutes at Bari, he went on loan to third division club Tritium where he made thirteen appearances and scored one goal, but once again, this spell proved largely unsuccessful.

He once again returned to Bari at the completion of his loan spell at Tritium but was once again sent out on loan, this time to another third division side, Savona, for the entire 2013–14 season. At Savona his performance did not improve either, as he played only a total fourteen games with a spare goal, and was released for free by Bari at the end of the season.

On 5 September 2014, it was announced Grandolfo had signed a contract with Serie D amateurs Correggese, with whom he had already training during the whole pre-season.

On 12 July 2015, Grandolfo signed a 2-years contract with the Lega Pro side Fidelis Andria.

In August 2016, Grandolfo signed for Serie C club Bassano.

He successively joined newly promoted Serie C club Virtus Verona for the 2018–19 season.

On 10 July 2019 he signed a one-year contract with second-year extension option with Vis Pesaro.

On 9 January 2020 he moved to another Serie C club Sambenedettese.

On 7 September 2020 he joined Legnago.

On 31 July 2021, Grandolfo joined to Monopoli.

On 14 July 2022, he moved to Arzignano.

On 1 February 2024, Grandolfo returned to Monopoli on a 1.5-year deal.
