= Leonardo Pérez =

Italian footballer

Personal information
- Date of birth: 27 September 1989 (age 37)
- Place of birth: Mesagne, Italy
- Height: 1.87 m (6 ft 2 in)
- Position: Striker

Team information
- Current team: Casarano
- Number: 18

Youth career
- –2007: Brindisi
- 2007–2009: Bari

Senior career*
Years	Team	Apps	(Gls)
2009–2010	Bari	0	(0)
2009–2010	→ Gubbio (loan)	31	(4)
2010–2013	Pisa	55	(11)
2011	→ Giulianova (loan)	10	(0)
2013–2015	Cittadella	29	(4)
2014–2015	→ Ascoli (loan)	27	(12)
2015–2018	Ascoli	56	(6)
2018–2019	Cosenza	25	(2)
2019	→ Piacenza (loan)	16	(0)
2019–2021	Virtus Francavilla	38	(13)
2021	Arezzo	12	(1)
2021–2023	Virtus Francavilla	32	(5)
2023	→ Messina (loan)	16	(0)
2023–	Casarano	79	(10)
- * Club domestic league appearances and goals as of 1 May 2026

Leonardo Pérez (born 27 September 1989) is an Italian professional footballer who plays as a striker for Serie C Group C club Casarano.

== Career ==
Perez began his career on youth side for Brindisi and was 2007 scouted by Bari. He played two years in the primavera team of Bari and he was loaned him later for the rest of the 2009–10 season to Lega Pro Seconda Divisione team A.S. Gubbio 1910

In August 2010 he joined Pisa in co-ownership deal for a peppercorn of €250. In June 2011 Bari gave up the remain 50% registration rights to Pisa.

Perez was signed by Serie B club Cittadella in July 2013 in another co-ownership deal. In 2014, he was signed by Ascoli on loan, with an option to purchase.

In 2015, his use of the Roman salute, a gesture adopted by Italian fascists in the 20th century, while playing for Ascoli created controversy.

Pérez wore No. 9 shirt for the Serie B newcomer in 2015–16 season.

On 31 January 2019, he joined Piacenza on loan.

On 20 August 2019, he signed with Virtus Francavilla.

On 14 January 2021, he moved to Arezzo.

He returned to Virtus Francavilla on 16 June 2021.

On 11 January 2023, Pérez signed with Messina on loan.

On 7 September 2023, Pérez signed with Casarano.
