= Jonas Brändle =

German footballer

Personal information
- Date of birth: 6 May 2000 (age 26)
- Place of birth: Germany
- Height: 1.74 m (5 ft 8 1/2 in)
- Position: Left-back

Team information
- Current team: TSG Balingen
- Number: 11

Youth career
- FC 99 Inzigkofen/Vilsingen/Engelswies
- FV Ravensburg
- –2015: SC Pfullendorf
- 2015–2019: 1. FC Heidenheim

Senior career*
| Years | Team | Apps | (Gls) |
| 2019–2021 | 1. FC Heidenheim | 1 | (0) |
| 2020–2021 | → Sonnenhof Großaspach (loan) | 29 | (0) |
| 2021–2022 | Sonnenhof Großaspach | 29 | (1) |
| 2022–2025 | FC 08 Villingen | 45 | (5) |
| 2025– | TSG Balingen | 22 | (2) |
- * Club domestic league appearances and goals as of 27 September 2026

Jonas Brändle (born 6 May 2000) is a German footballer who plays as a left-back for TSG Balingen.

== Career ==
In July 2018, Brändle signed a local player contract with 1. FC Heidenheim, lasting three years until 30 June 2021. He made his professional debut for Heidenheim in the 2. Bundesliga on 8 March 2019, coming on as a substitute in the 87th minute for Marc Schnatterer in the match against VfL Bochum, which finished as a 0–1 away loss. In August 2020, Brändle's contract with Heidenheim was extended until the summer of 2022 and joined Regionalliga Südwest side Sonnenhof Großaspach on a season-long loan.
