= Vincenzo Ferrara =

Italian footballer

Personal information
- Date of birth: 29 June 1993 (age 33)
- Place of birth: Caserta, Italy
- Height: 1.82 m (6 ft 0 in)
- Position: Winger

Team information
- Current team: Casarano
- Number: 11

Youth career
- Sassuolo

Senior career*
Years	Team	Apps	(Gls)
2011–2014	Sassuolo	1	(0)
2012–2013	→ Reggiana (loan)	11	(0)
2013–2014	→ Aprilia (loan)	20	(0)
2014–2015	Virtus Castelfranco	38	(10)
2015–2017	Este	68	(13)
2017–2018	GSD Ambrosiana	27	(9)
2018–2019	Virtus Verona	32	(3)
2019–2020	Arzignano	14	(1)
2020–2021	Fano	37	(4)
2021	Trento	8	(0)
2021–2022	Desenzano Calvina	20	(1)
2022–2024	Matera	54	(10)
2024–	Casarano	57	(9)
- * Club domestic league appearances and goals as of 1 May 2026

Vincenzo Ferrara (born 29 June 1993) is an Italian professional footballer who plays as a winger for Serie C Group C club Casarano.

== Club career ==
Born in Caserta, Ferrara started his career in Sassuolo youth system. He made his senior debut on 14 May 2011 as a late substitute against Padova for Serie B.

After his debut, he joined on loan to Reggiana and Aprilia, and in 2014 he left Sassuolo and joined Serie D club Virtus Castelfranco.

In the 2019–20 season, he played for Arzignano.

In 2020, he signed for Alma Juventus Fano.

On 13 July 2021, he joined Serie C club Trento. On 17 December 2021, his contract with Trento was terminated by mutual consent. On 20 December 2021, he signed with Serie D club Desenzano Calvina.
