= Adorian Himcinschi =

Romanian footballer (born 1971)

Personal information
- Full name: Adorian Aurel Himcinschi
- Date of birth: 31 January 1971 (age 55)
- Place of birth: Timișoara, Romania
- Height: 1.87 m (6 ft 2 in)
- Position: Central defender

Youth career
- Progresul Timișoara

Senior career*
Years	Team	Apps	(Gls)
1988–1991	Progresul Timișoara		
1991–1996	CFR Timișoara (Note: The statistics for the 1991–92 and 1992–93 Divizia B seasons are unavailable.)	103	(2)
1997–2000	Apulum Alba Iulia	92	(7)
2000	Soda Ocna Mureș		
2001–2002	Minaur Zlatna (Note: The statistics for the 2000–01 Divizia C season are unavailable.)	26	(1)
2002–2003	Apulum Alba Iulia	27	(0)
2003	Minaur Zlatna	2	(0)
2004	Apulum Alba Iulia	13	(0)
Total		267	(10)

Managerial career
- 2010: Unirea Alba Iulia
- 2014–2016: Performanța Ighiu
- 2017: Unirea Alba Iulia
- 2018–2019: Performanța Ighiu
- * Club domestic league appearances and goals

Adorian Aurel Himcinschi (born 31 January 1971) is a Romanian former footballer who played as a defender. After he ended his playing career he worked as a manager at teams from the Romanian lower leagues. His son, Fabian Himcinschi was also a footballer.

== Honours ==
=== Player ===
Minaur Zlatna

- Divizia C: 2000–01

Apulum Alba Iulia

- Divizia B: 2002–03
