= Ilya Zatenko =

Belarusian footballer

Personal information
- Date of birth: 14 January 1994 (age 32)
- Place of birth: Zhlobin, Gomel Oblast, Belarus
- Height: 1.79 m (5 ft 10 1/2 in)
- Position: Forward

Team information
- Current team: Leskhoz Gomel
- Number: 10

Youth career
- 2010–2011: Gomel

Senior career*
Years	Team	Apps	(Gls)
2011–2016	Gomel	1	(0)
2014	→ Gomelzheldortrans (loan)	15	(1)
2015	→ Zhlobin (loan)	5	(2)
2015–2016	→ Khimik Svetlogorsk (loan)	30	(5)
2017	Belshina Bobruisk	23	(5)
2018–2019	Sputnik Rechitsa	37	(8)
2020	Zhlobin	4	(1)
2021–	Leskhoz Gomel	11	(10)
- * Club domestic league appearances and goals as of 31 December 2022

Ilya Zatenko (Belarusian: Iлля Заценка; Russian: Илья Затенко; born 14 January 1994) is a Belarusian professional footballer. As of 2021, he plays for Leskhoz Gomel.
