= TSG Balingen =

German football club

- Full name: Turn- und Sportgemeinschaft Balingen von 1848 e.V.
- Nickname: TSG
- Founded: 1848
- Ground: Bizerba Arena
- Capacity: 8,500
- Chairman: Eugen Straubinger
- Head coach: Martin Braun
- League: Oberliga Baden-Württemberg (V)
- 2025–26: Regionalliga Südwest, 17th of 18 (relegated)
- Website: http://www.tsg-balingen.de/
Home colours	Away colours	colours

TSG Balingen is a German football club from the city of Balingen, Baden-Württemberg. With over 1,800 members, it is the largest sports club in the city and has departments for athletics, basketball, fencing, fistball, gymnastics, handball, judo, and karate, as well as various personal health oriented programs.

In 2002 the first handball team merged with TV Weilstetten to HBW Balingen-Weilstetten. The team now plays in Handball-Bundesliga.

== History ==
The origins of the club go back to the 19th century founding of a gymnastics club. The footballers first came to notice in the mid-90s with their advance to the Verbandsliga Württemberg (V) in 1995.

After twice finishing as vice-champions in the Verbandsliga and failing to win promotion to the Oberliga Baden-Württemberg (IV) in subsequent playoffs, TSG finally claimed the league title in 2008 and advanced to what has become a fifth tier competition following the introduction of the 3. Liga. They won the Oberliga Baden-Württemberg in 2018 to gain promotion to the Regionalliga Südwest.

== Honours ==
- Oberliga Baden-Württemberg
  - Champions: 2017–18
- Verbandsliga Württemberg
  - Champions: 2007–08
  - Runners-up: 2004–05, 2005–06
- Württemberg Cup
  - Winners: 2023

== Current squad ==
As of 8 September 2026

Note: Flags indicate national team as defined under FIFA eligibility rules; some limited exceptions apply. Players may hold more than one non-FIFA nationality.

No.	Pos.	Nation	Player
1	GK	GER	Louis Potye
2	DF	GER	Sascha Eisele
3	DF	GER	Dustin Fritz
4	DF	GER	Marvin Jäger
6	MF	GER	Bastian Maier
7	FW	GER	Silas Bader
8	MF	GER	Ferdinand Schmidt
10	MF	CRO	Ivo Čolić
11	MF	GER	Jonas Brändle
15	DF	GER	Adrian Müller
16	MF	GER	Kevin Founes
17	MF	GER	Maxim Schmalz
18	DF	GER	Florian Barth

No.	Pos.	Nation	Player
19	FW	GER	Noel Feher
21	DF	GER	David Haas
22	MF	GER	Samuel Schneider
23	MF	GER	Mika Stauss
24	FW	GER	Noah Neff
25	DF	GER	Matthias Schmitz (captain)
27	MF	AUT	Christian Derflinger
29	DF	GER	Jonas Fritschi
30	FW	GER	Henoch Grauer
31	GK	GER	Tom Gerlach
33	FW	GER	Simon Klostermann
34	MF	GER	Henrik Niggel
42	GK	GER	Luke Spranger

== Recent managers ==
Recent managers of the club:

Manager	Start	Finish
Ralf Volkwein	26 October 2015	21 October 2019
Bernd Bauer	21 October 2019	9 January 2020
Martin Braun	10 January 2020	Present

== Recent seasons ==
The recent season-by-season performance of the club:

Season	Division	Tier	Position
1999–2000	Verbandsliga Württemberg	V	7th
2000–01	Verbandsliga Württemberg	V	3rd
2001–02	Verbandsliga Württemberg	V	7th
2002–03	Verbandsliga Württemberg	V	12th
2003–04	Verbandsliga Württemberg	V	7th
2004–05	Verbandsliga Württemberg	V	2nd
2005–06	Verbandsliga Württemberg	V	2nd
2006–07	Verbandsliga Württemberg	V	5th
2007–08	Verbandsliga Württemberg	V	1st ↑
2008–09	Oberliga Baden-Württemberg	V	3rd
2009–10	Oberliga Baden-Württemberg	V	10th
2010–11	Oberliga Baden-Württemberg	V	10th
2011–12	Oberliga Baden-Württemberg	V	5th
2012–13	Oberliga Baden-Württemberg	V	10th
2013–14	Oberliga Baden-Württemberg	V	13th
2014–15	Oberliga Baden-Württemberg	V	3rd
2015–16	Oberliga Baden-Württemberg	V	8th
2016–17	Oberliga Baden-Württemberg	V	4th
2017–18	Oberliga Baden-Württemberg	V	1st ↑
2018–19	Regionalliga Südwest	IV	11th
2019–20	Regionalliga Südwest	IV	17th
2020–21	Regionalliga Südwest	IV	15th
2021–22	Regionalliga Südwest	IV	8th
2022–23	Regionalliga Südwest	IV	6th
2023–24	Regionalliga Südwest	IV	17th ↓
2024-25	Oberliga Baden-Württemberg	V	1st ↑
2025-26	Regionalliga Südwest	IV	17th ↓

- With the introduction of the Regionalligas in 1994 and the 3. Liga in 2008 as the new third tier, below the 2. Bundesliga, all leagues below dropped one tier.

↑ Promoted	↓ Relegated

== Stadium ==
TSG plays in the Bizerba Arena which has a capacity of 8,500, including 600 covered seats.
