= Mattia Maggio =

German-Italian footballer

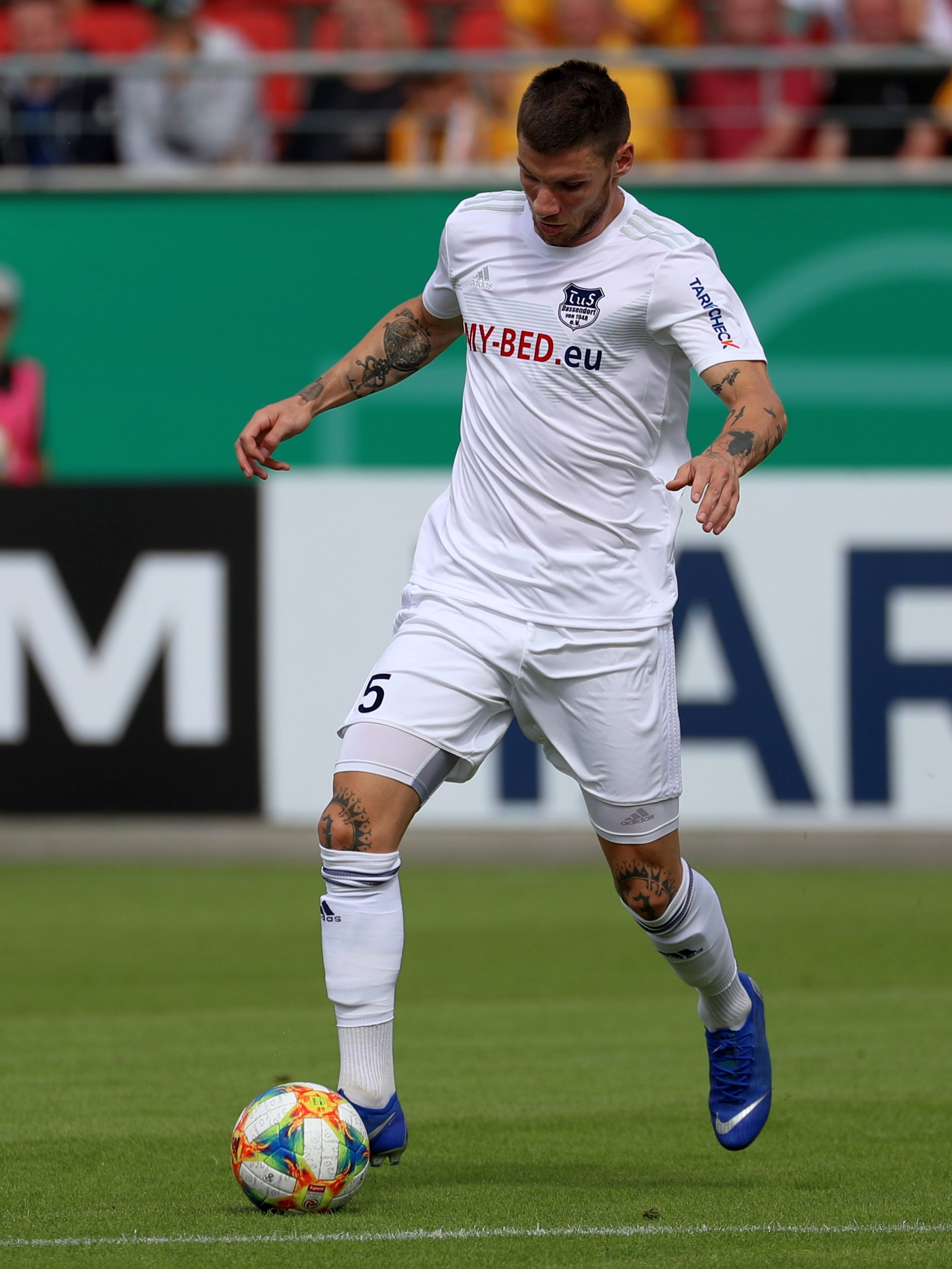
- Maggio in 2019

Personal information
- Date of birth: 22 February 1994 (age 32)
- Place of birth: Nürtingen, Germany
- Height: 1.86 m (6 ft 1 in)
- Position: Forward

Team information
- Current team: TuS Dassendorf
- Number: 5

Youth career
- 2002–2004: VfB Vaihingen
- 2004–2011: VfB Stuttgart
- 2011–2013: Novara
- 2013: Hamburger SV

Senior career*
Years	Team	Apps	(Gls)
2011–2013	Novara	1	(0)
2013–2014	Hamburger SV II	37	(9)
2013–2014	Hamburger SV	4	(0)
2014–2015	1899 Hoffenheim II	10	(1)
2016	Mantova	1	(0)
2016–2017	FC Nöttingen	24	(3)
2017–2018	ASV Geel	7	(2)
2019–	TuS Dassendorf	63	(35)

International career
2009–2010	Germany U16	3	(1)
2010–2011	Italy U17	13	(2)
- * Club domestic league appearances and goals as of 21:29, 2 February 2021 (UTC)

Mattia Maggio (born 22 February 1994) is a German-Italian former professional footballer who plays as a forward for TuS Dassendorf.

== Early life ==
The parents of Mattia Maggio come from the Salento in Apulia, and had once emigrated from their homeland and settled in Swabia in Germany. Maggio was born in Nürtingen; in the age of eight years he moved with his family to Vaihingen an der Enz. As he grew up bilingual, he speaks German and Italian fluently. Mattia Maggio discovered as a child his passion for football. This sport he practiced with his friends on the street and in the e-youth, he joined the VfB Vaihingen. At the age of ten years, he applied for a trial with VfB Stuttgart and in a three-month selection process, he beat out over 200 other competitors. Maggio joined now in the youth academy of the Bundesliga side. He played until 2011 for the Swabians before he went in the summer in the Italian homeland of his parents when he accepted an offer the youth of Novara Calcio. He justified the change with the opportunity to further develop especially as he got a little operating times with the Swabians. In Novara, he was also in the extended professional squad, which had risen in the summer in the Serie A. However, he was only allowed to play in January.

== Club career ==
=== Serie A debut ===
On 12 May 2012, Maggio celebrated his professional debut when he came off the bench in the 1-2 defeat in Serie A against AC Milan in the 84th minute for Simone Pesce.

=== Hamburger SV ===
Maggio returns in January 2013 to Germany and after a trial joined Hamburger SV. He signed a contract there in the reserve team, however, was initially used in the A-Youth (U-19). In four games, he scored three goals. On 15 May 2013 Maggio debuted in the reserve team in the league game operation and scored his first goal as he's 3–1 win against Victoria Hamburg scored the 2–0.

In the final phase of the 2013–14 season Maggio came to injury-related failures of many players on offense and good performance for his part in the professional squad. For example, Maggio scored in a 4–1 victory over SV Eichede three goals. He made his Bundesliga debut for the club on 4 April 2014 in a match against Bayer Leverkusen. Maggio substituted Jacques Zoua 77 minutes into a 2–1 home win. Hamburger SV finished after 34 matches on the 16th place in the table game and had the Barrage, where the "Rothosen" had requested a 0–0 and a 1–1 prevailed on away goals against Greuther Fürth and thus managed to avoid relegation. In the remaining games Maggio could not draw attention to himself and thus had to leave the club.

== International career ==
Steffen Freund was on Mattia Maggio attention when he played for VfB Stuttgart and because of Maggio played twice in the U-16 national team of Germany. Maggio felt but as Italians and looked, however, as an Italian and he identifies himself with Italy and he feels attracted to Italy. Because of this, he then decided to play for Italy, and he played 13 times for the U-17 National Team in Italy.

== Personal life ==
Following a 2010 accident, when a glass splinter entered his retina, he is left with only ten percent sight on the left eye.
