= Savaş Yılmaz =

Turkish footballer

Personal information
- Date of birth: 1 January 1990 (age 36)
- Place of birth: Sürmene, Trabzon, Turkey
- Height: 1.83 m (6 ft 0 in)
- Position: Defensive midfielder

Youth career
- 2000–2005: Zeytinburnuspor

Senior career*
Years	Team	Apps	(Gls)
2005–2007	Zeytinburnuspor	8	(0)
2007–2011	Kayserispor	33	(0)
2011–2012	Samsunspor	4	(0)
2012–2013	Boluspor	20	(0)
2013–2015	1461 Trabzon	59	(2)
2015–2017	Manisaspor	53	(4)
2017–2018	Adana Demirspor	27	(3)
2018–2019	Samsunspor	30	(1)
2019–2020	Nevşehir Belediyespor	14	(1)
2020–2021	Sarıyer	32	(1)
2021–2022	Sakaryaspor	7	(0)
2022–2023	Sarıyer	18	(0)
2023	Zonguldak Kömürspor	1	(0)
2023–2025	Muğlaspor		

International career^{‡}
2006	Turkey U16	4	(0)
2006–2007	Turkey U17	17	(0)
2007–2008	Turkey U18	13	(1)
2008	Turkey U19	4	(0)
2011	Turkey U21	4	(1)
- * Club domestic league appearances and goals as of 15 September 2023 ‡ National team caps and goals as of 6 September 2011

Savaş Yılmaz (born 1 January 1990) is a Turkish professional footballer who plays as a defensive midfielder. He is a youth international for Turkey, earning caps at U16, U17, U18, U19 and U21 level.
