= Fabian Eberle =

Liechtenstein footballer

Personal information
- Full name: Fabian Eberle
- Date of birth: 27 July 1992 (age 34)
- Place of birth: Liechtenstein
- Height: 1.84 m (6 ft 1/2 in)
- Position: Defender

Youth career
- Balzers

Senior career*
Years	Team	Apps	(Gls)
2010–2013	Balzers	47	(2)
2013–2015	Triesenberg		
2015–2017	Schaan		
2017–2023	Konolfingen	48	(4)
2023–2025	Schaan	0	(0)

International career^{‡}
2011–2014	Liechtenstein U-21	13	(1)
2011–2018	Liechtenstein	7	(0)
- * Club domestic league appearances and goals as of 6 June 2026 ‡ National team caps and goals as of 19 November 2018

Fabian Eberle (born 27 July 1992) is a retired Liechtensteiner footballer who last played for Schaan.

== International career ==
He was a member of the Liechtenstein national under-21 football team and had 13 caps and one goal. Eberle made his senior team debut on 11 November 2011 in a friendly against Hungary.
