= Wolfgang Kieber =

Liechtensteiner footballer

Personal information
- Date of birth: 22 July 1984 (age 42)
- Place of birth: Feldkirch, Austria
- Height: 1.76 m (5 ft 9 1/2 in)
- Position: Midfielder

Senior career*
Years	Team	Apps	(Gls)
2004–2010	FC Blau-Weiß Feldkirch	86	(10)
2010–2011	FC Balzers	8	(1)
2011–2013	FC Blau-Weiß Feldkirch	32	(5)
2013–2016	SC Tisis	67	(11)
2016–2020	SV Frastanz	51	(1)

International career
2005–2011	Liechtenstein	13	(0)
- * Club domestic league appearances and goals

Wolfgang Kieber (born 22 July 1984) is a retired footballer who played as a midfielder. Born in Austria, he represented the Liechtenstein national team.
