= Thomas Horsten =

Dutch footballer

Personal information
- Date of birth: 5 January 1994 (age 32)
- Place of birth: Veldhoven, Netherlands
- Height: 1.80 m (5 ft 11 in)
- Position: Midfielder

Team information
- Current team: GVV Unitas

Youth career
- –2002: UNA
- 2002–2013: PSV

Senior career*
Years	Team	Apps	(Gls)
2013–2014	PSV	0	(0)
2013–2014	→ Jong PSV	31	(1)
2014–2015	Cavese	2	(0)
2015–2018	FC Eindhoven	78	(0)
2018–2019	TEC	22	(2)
2019–2024	UNA	75	(4)
2024–	Unitas		

International career
2009-2010	Netherlands U16	9	(2)
2010	Netherlands U17	5	(2)
- * Club domestic league appearances and goals as of 15 December 2024

Thomas Horsten (born 5 January 1994) is a Dutch footballer who plays as a midfielder for GVV Unitas.

== Career ==
Horsten made his professional debut for Jong PSV, the second team of PSV Eindhoven, in the Eerste Divisie, the Dutch second tier, on 3 August 2013 against Sparta.

After a spell in Italy with Cavese, he played for FC Eindhoven, before moving to TEC in summer 2018. Ahead of the 2019–20 season, Horsten joined VV UNA. In 2024, he left them for Unitas.

Horsten also played 9 times for the Netherlands national under-16 football team and has played for the U15s as well.
