= Niklas Kieber =

Liechtensteiner footballer (born 1993)

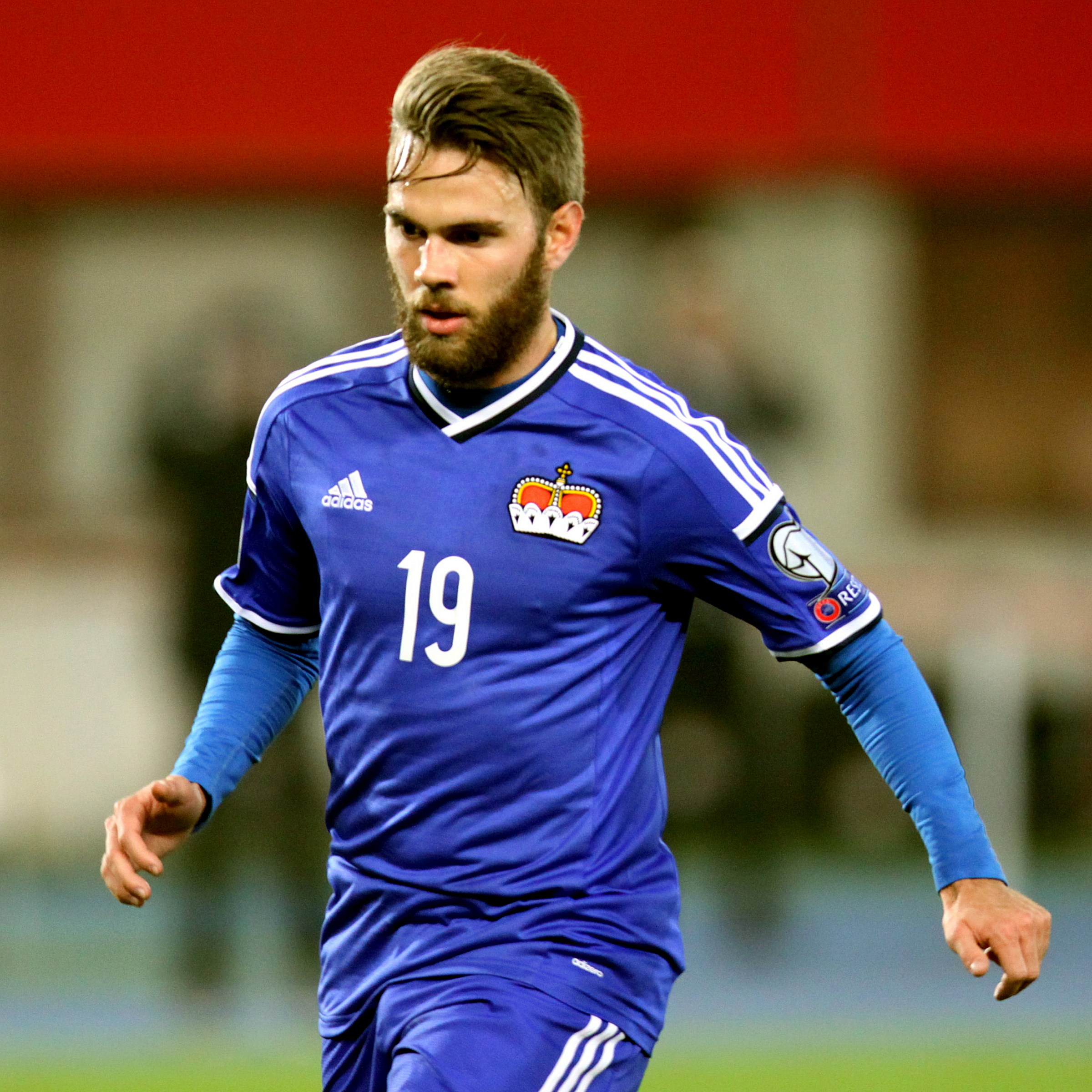

Personal information
- Full name: Niklas Kieber
- Date of birth: 4 March 1993 (age 33)
- Place of birth: Liechtenstein
- Height: 1.70 m (5 ft 7 in)
- Position: Forward

Team information
- Current team: FC Triesenberg

Youth career
- 2000–2009: FC Triesen

Senior career*
Years	Team	Apps	(Gls)
2009–2010	FC Triesen		
2010–2011	FC Vaduz	0	(0)
2011–2012	FC Balzers	18	(0)
2012–2014	FC St. Gallen II	7	(0)
2014–2018	USV Eschen/Mauren	79	(5)
2019–2020	FC Triesenberg	0	(0)

International career^{‡}
2011–2014	Liechtenstein U-21	17	(2)
2012–2018	Liechtenstein	11	(0)
- * Club domestic league appearances and goals as of 27 June 2022 ‡ National team caps and goals as of 13 October 2018

Niklas Kieber (born 4 March 1993) is a Liechtensteiner footballer who last played for FC Triesenberg.

== Career ==
Kieber began his career in 2000 with FC Triesen.

== International career ==
He was a member of the Liechtenstein national under-21 football team and had 17 caps and two goals. Kieber made his debut for the senior team as a late substitute against Lithuania in a 2014 FIFA World Cup qualifying match in October 2012.
