= Fabian Himcinschi =

Romanian footballer

Personal information
- Full name: Fabian Adrian Himcinschi
- Date of birth: 12 May 1994 (age 32)
- Place of birth: Alba Iulia, Romania
- Height: 1.90 m (6 ft 3 in)
- Position: Striker

Youth career
- Unirea Alba Iulia
- Empoli

Senior career*
Years	Team	Apps	(Gls)
2010–2011	Unirea Alba Iulia	12	(4)
2012–2014	Empoli Primavera	4	(2)
2013–2014	→ Poli Timișoara (loan)	4	(1)
2014	Caransebeș	16	(8)
2015	Râmnicu Vâlcea	8	(2)
2015–2016	Dinamo București	4	(0)
2015–2016	→ Dunărea Călăraşi (loan)	3	(1)
2016	→ Performanța Ighiu (loan)	?	(?)
2016	Performanța Ighiu	?	(?)
2017	CSMȘ Reșița	17	(3)
2018	Șoimii Lipova	?	(?)
2018–2019	CSU Alba Iulia	?	(?)
Total		68	(21)

International career^{‡}
2010–2011	Romania U-17	8	(9)
- * Club domestic league appearances and goals as of 8 August 2018 ‡ National team caps and goals as of 19 April 2015

Fabian Adrian Himcinschi (born 12 May 1994) is a Romanian former footballer who played as a striker. His father, Adorian Himcinschi was also a footballer.
