= Erkut Şentürk =

Turkish footballer

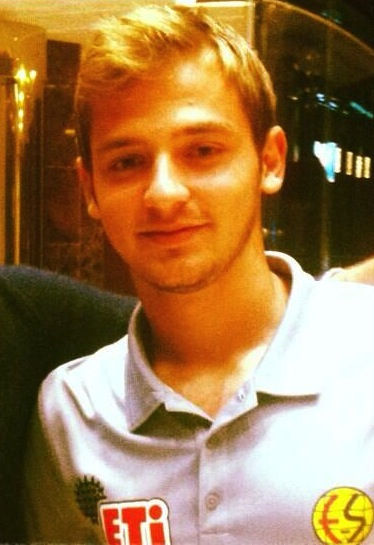

Personal information
- Full name: Mehmet Erkut Şentürk
- Date of birth: 6 May 1994 (age 32)
- Place of birth: Bakırköy, Turkey
- Height: 1.74 m (5 ft 9 in)
- Positions: Attacking midfielder; wing

Team information
- Current team: Amed
- Number: 20

Youth career
- 2006–2010: Beşiktaş

Senior career*
Years	Team	Apps	(Gls)
2010–2012	Beşiktaş	0	(0)
2012–2016	Eskişehirspor	19	(1)
2017	Fatih Karagümrük	4	(0)
2018–	Amed	24	(0)

International career^{‡}
2009	Turkey U15	5	(1)
2009–2010	Turkey U16	9	(0)
2010–2011	Turkey U17	10	(3)
2011–2012	Turkey U18	4	(0)
- * Club domestic league appearances and goals as of 26 October 2019 ‡ National team caps and goals as of 30 January 2013

Mehmet Erkut Şentürk (born 6 May 1994) is a Turkish footballer who plays as a midfielder for Amed. He made his Süper Lig debut against Orduspor on 28 January 2013.
