= Stadio Giuseppe Capozza =

Coordinates: 40.0146°N 18.1555°E

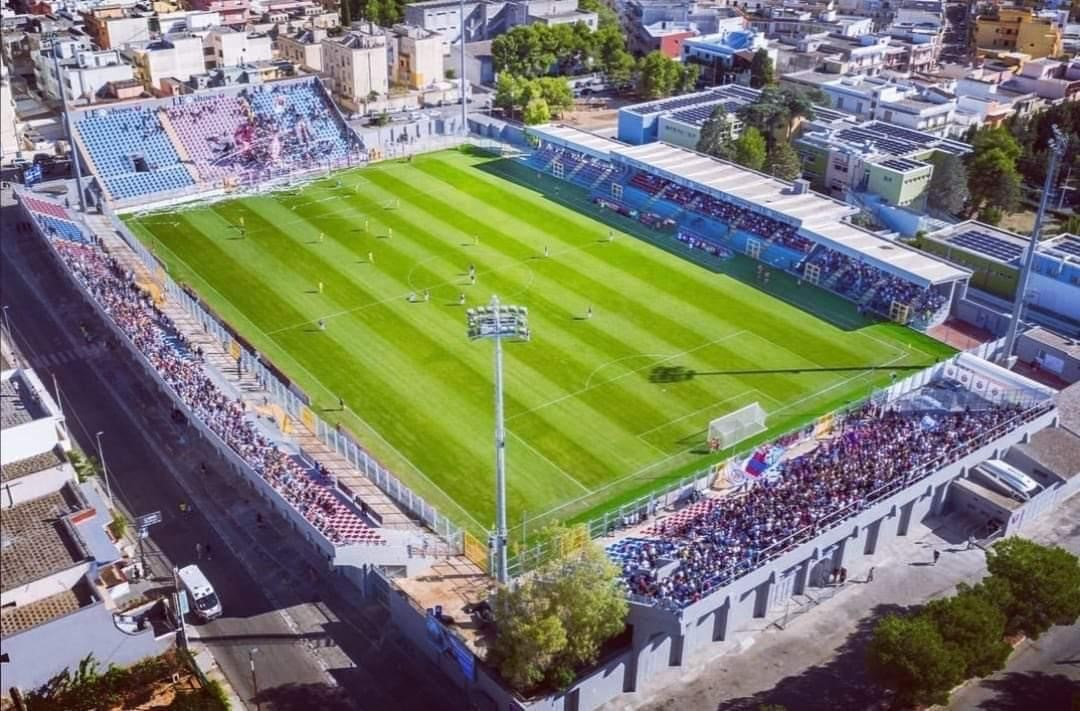
- STADIO GIUSEPPE CAPOZZA CASARANO
- Interactive map of Stadio Giuseppe Capozza
- Location: Casarano, Italy
- Capacity: 6,500

Construction
- Built: 1956
- Renovated: 1987 and 2007

Tenant
- Virtus Casarano

Stadio Giuseppe Capozza is an arena in Casarano, Italy. It is primarily used for football, and is the home to the Virtus Casarano of the Serie D. It opened in 1956 and holds 6,500 spectators.
