= Christian Derflinger =

Austrian footballer

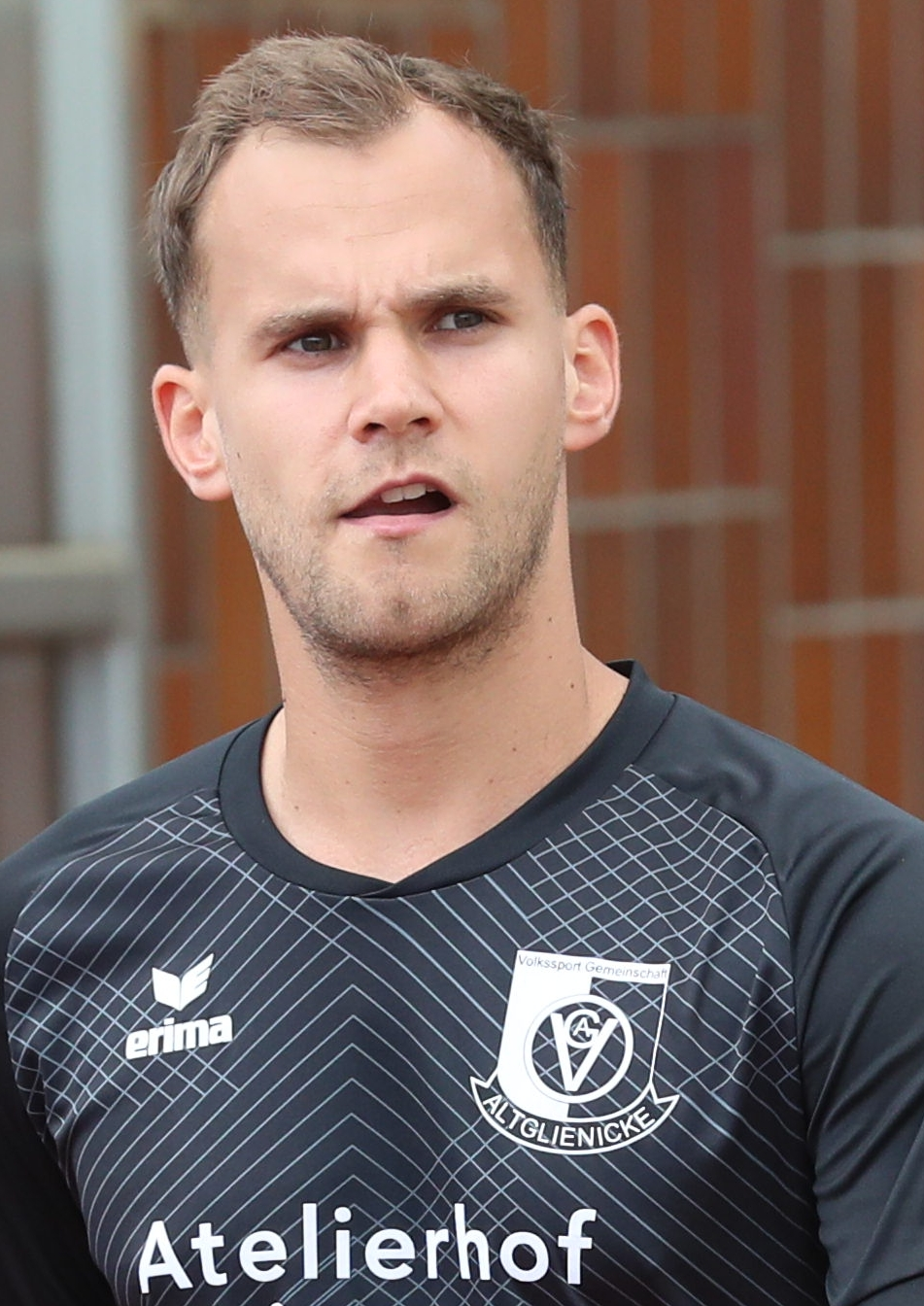

Personal information
- Date of birth: 2 February 1994 (age 32)
- Place of birth: Linz, Austria
- Height: 1.73 m (5 ft 8 in)
- Position: Left winger

Team information
- Current team: TSG Balingen
- Number: 27

Youth career
- 2003–2008: LASK Linz
- 2008–2012: Bayern Munich

Senior career*
Years	Team	Apps	(Gls)
2012–2014	Bayern Munich II	25	(3)
2014–2015	Hamburger SV II	27	(2)
2015–2016	SV Grödig	22	(3)
2016–2018	Greuther Fürth II	51	(4)
2016–2018	Greuther Fürth	2	(0)
2018–2019	Viktoria Köln	25	(7)
2019–2021	SV Rödinghausen	39	(3)
2021–2022	VSG Altglienicke	26	(10)
2022–2024	Kickers Offenbach	33	(4)
2024–2026	FC 08 Villingen	59	(14)
2026–	TSG Balingen	7	(5)

International career
2010–2011	Austria U17	7	(4)
2012	Austria U19	1	(1)
2015	Austria U21	2	(1)
- * Club domestic league appearances and goals as of 27 September 2026

Christian Derflinger (born 2 February 1994) is an Austrian footballer who plays for TSG Balingen in the German Oberliga Baden-Württemberg.
