= Casarano =

- Comune
- Comune di Casarano
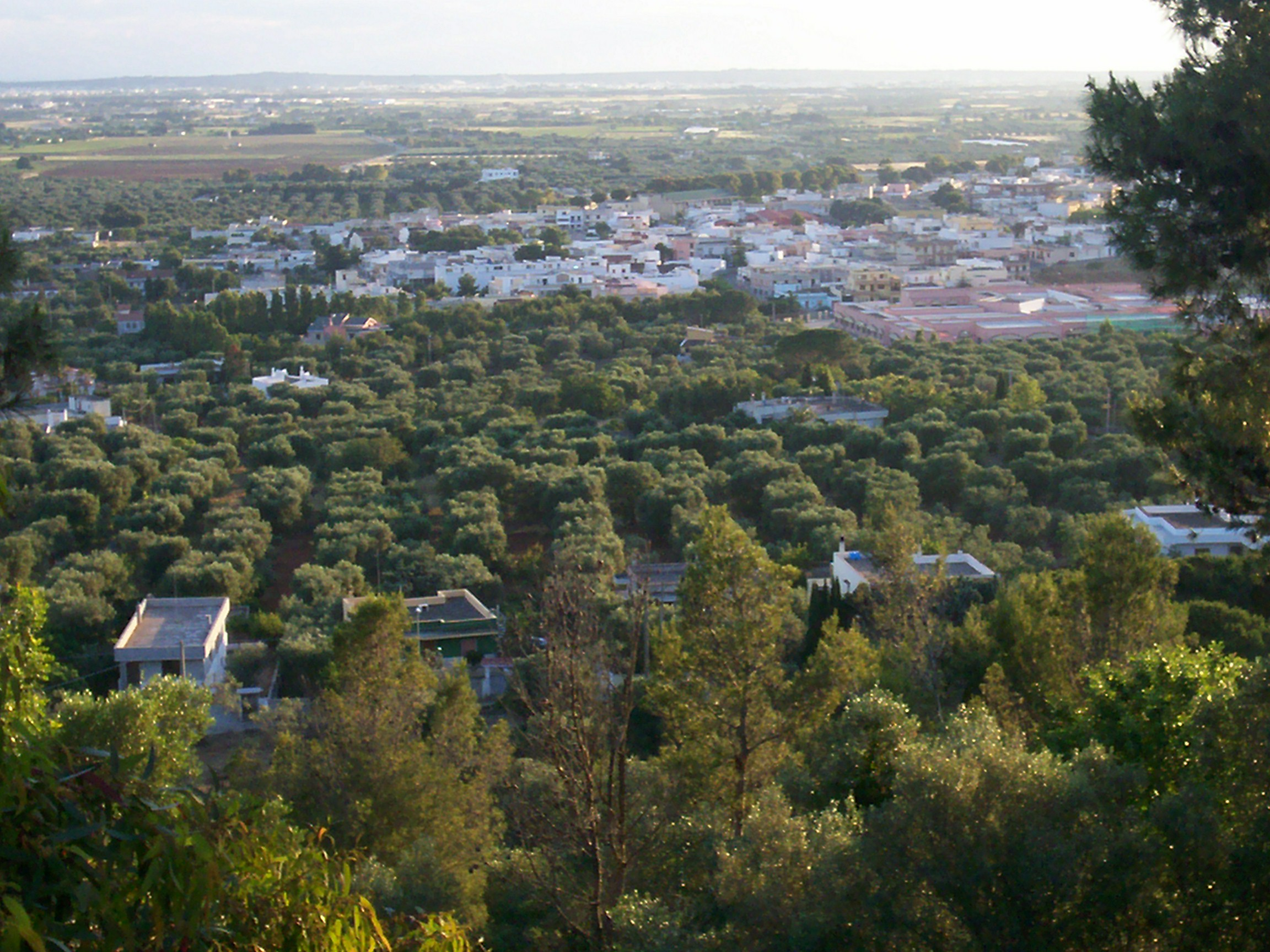
- Panorama of Casarano

- Location within Italy Location within Apulia
- Coordinates: 40°1′N 18°10′E
- Country: Italy
- Region: Apulia
- Province: Lecce (LE)

Government
  - Mayor: Ottavio De Nuzzo

Area
  - Total: 38 km^{2} (15 sq mi)
- Elevation: 109 m (358 ft)

Population (13 May 2017)
  - Total: 20,169
  - Density: 530/km^{2} (1,400/sq mi)
- Demonym: Casaranesi
- Time zone: UTC+1 (CET)
  - Summer (DST): UTC+2 (CEST)
- Postal code: 73042
- Dialing code: 0833
- ISTAT code: 075016
- Patron saint: San Giovanni Elemosiniere and Santa Maria della Campana
- Saint day: Monday after the third Sunday of May
- Website: Official website

Casarano (Salentino: Casaranu) is a town and sixth most populous comune in the Italian province of Lecce, in the Apulia region of South-East Italy. The town's economy is mostly agriculture-based, with olive oil being the main product. The Church of Santa Maria Della Croce is one of the oldest Christian sites in the world.

== Twin towns ==
- Charleroi, Belgium
