= 2013 UEFA European Under-21 Championship qualification Group 3 =

Football tournament qualification stage

The teams competing in Group 3 of the 2013 UEFA European Under-21 Championship qualifying competition were Andorra, Armenia, Czech Republic, Montenegro, and Wales.

== Standings ==
Pos	Team	Pld	W	D	L	GF	GA	GD	Pts	Qualification	(Czech Republic)	(Armenia)	(Montenegro)	(Wales)	(Andorra)
1	Czech Republic	8	6	2	0	24	3	+21	20	Play-offs	—	1–1	2–1	5–0	8–0
2	Armenia	8	4	3	1	11	5	+6	15		0–2	—	4–1	0–0	4–1
3	Montenegro	8	3	2	3	14	8	+6	11		0–0	0–0	—	3–1	4–0
4	Wales	8	3	1	4	7	10	−3	10		0–1	0–1	1–0	—	4–0
5	Andorra	8	0	0	8	2	32	−30	0		1–5	0–1	0–5	0–1	—

== Results and fixtures ==
29 March 2011
16:00

Andorra	0–1	Wales
	Report	Fajardo 21' (o.g.)

Estadi Comunal d'Andorra la Vella, Andorra la Vella
Referee: Sébastien Delferière (Belgium)

3 June 2011
16:00

Andorra	0–5	Montenegro
	Report	Vešović 56'; Nikolić 65'; Kajević 68', 90+1'; Mugoša 86'

Estadi Comunal d'Andorra la Vella, Andorra la Vella
Referee: Georgi Vadachkoria (Georgia)

7 June 2011
17:00

Armenia	4–1	Montenegro
Malakyan 3', 52'; H. Hovhannisyan 77'; Poghosyan 84'	Report	Nikolić 78'

Hanrapetakan Stadium, Yerevan
Referee: Gerhard Grobelnik (Austria)

10 August 2011
17:45

Czech Republic	8–0	Andorra
Kadlec 6', 40' (pen.), 72'; Wágner 14'; Nitrianský 47'; Darida 54'; Petr 89'; Hušbauer 90+3'	Report

Městský stadion, Mladá Boleslav
Referee: Vadims Direktorenko (Latvia)

3 September 2011
16:00

Andorra	0–1	Armenia
	Report	Poghosyan 85'

Estadi Comunal d'Andorra la Vella, Andorra la Vella
Referee: Sven Bindels (Luxembourg)

6 September 2011
17:00

Czech Republic	1–1	Armenia
Darida 68'	Report	Malakyan 55'

Městský fotbalový stadion, Uherské Hradiště
Referee: Anastasios Sidiropoulos (Greece)
6 September 2011
20:30

Montenegro	3–1	Wales
Golubović 65'; Mugoša 77'; Nikolić 88'	Report	Bradshaw 55'

Stadion Podgorica, Podgorica
Referee: Alan Mario Sant (Malta)

8 October 2011
19:00

Wales	1–0	Montenegro
Alfei 58' (pen.)	Report

The Racecourse Ground, Wrexham
Referee: Vladimir Vnuk (Slovakia)

11 October 2011
20:15

Wales	0–1	Czech Republic
	Report	Kadlec 5'

The Racecourse Ground, Wrexham
Referee: Nikolaj Hänni (Switzerland)

11 November 2011
13:00

Montenegro	4–0	Andorra
Alić 7'; Mugoša 9'; Nikolić 51'; Vukčević 70'	Report

Gradski stadion, Nikšić
Referee: Eiko Saar (Estonia)
11 November 2011
14:00

Armenia	0–2	Czech Republic
	Report	Chramosta 76', 90+2'

Republican Stadium, Yerevan
Referee: Dag Vidar Hafsås (Norway)

15 November 2011
14:00

Armenia	0–0	Wales
	Report

Republican Stadium, Yerevan
Referee: Igor Pristovnik (Croatia)

29 February 2012
17:00

Wales	4–0	Andorra
Bodin 22', 33'; Vieira 44' (o.g.); Doble 59'	Report

The Racecourse Ground, Wrexham
Referee: Vitaly Sevostyanik (Belarus)

1 June 2012
17:00

Czech Republic	2–1	Montenegro
Chramosta 34', 63'	Report	Radulović 75'

Chance Arena, Jablonec nad Nisou
Referee: Vladimir Kazmenko (Russia)

5 June 2012
17:30

Andorra	1–5	Czech Republic
San Nicolas 70'	Report	Chramosta 25', 39', 45', 69', 77'

Estadi Comunal d'Andorra la Vella, Andorra la Vella
Referee: Bardhyl Pashaj (Albania)

12 June 2012
18:00

Armenia	4–1	Andorra
H. Hovhannisyan 4'; Voskanyan 36'; Yedigaryan 46'; K. Hovhannisyan 89'	Report	Smith 33'

Republican Stadium, Yerevan
Referee: Andris Treimanis (Latvia)

15 August 2012
20:00

Wales	0–1	Armenia
	Report	Hambardzumyan 7' (pen.)

The Racecourse Ground, Wrexham
Referee: Kenn Hansen (Denmark)

7 September 2012
16:00

Montenegro	0–0	Czech Republic
	Report

Gradski stadion, Nikšić
Referee: Olivier Thual (France)

10 September 2012
17:30

Czech Republic	5–0	Wales
Novák 17'; Wágner 60'; Vaněk 68'; Tecl 73' (pen.), 79'	Report

Chance Arena, Jablonec nad Nisou
Referee: Ievgenii Aranovskyi (Ukraine)
10 September 2012
17:30

Montenegro	0–0	Armenia
	Report

Stadion Podgorica, Podgorica
Referee: Vadims Direktorenko (Latvia)

== Goalscorers ==
9 goals

- (Czech Republic) Jan Chramosta

4 goals

- (Czech Republic) Václav Kadlec
- (Montenegro) Stefan Nikolić

3 goals

- (Armenia) Edgar Malakyan
- (Montenegro) Stefan Mugoša

2 goals

- (Armenia) Hovhannes Hovhannisyan
- (Armenia) Valter Poghosyan
- (Czech Republic) Vladimír Darida
- (Czech Republic) Stanislav Tecl
- (Czech Republic) Tomáš Wágner
- (Montenegro) Asmir Kajević
- (Wales) Billy Bodin

1 goal

- (Andorra) Luigi San Nicolas
- (Andorra) Adam Smith
- (Armenia) Hovhannes Hambardzumyan
- (Armenia) Kamo Hovhannisyan
- (Armenia) Taron Voskanyan
- (Armenia) Artak Yedigaryan
- (Czech Republic) Josef Hušbauer
- (Czech Republic) Milan Nitrianský
- (Czech Republic) Filip Novák
- (Czech Republic) Jakub Petr
- (Czech Republic) Ondřej Vaněk
- (Montenegro) Ermin Alić
- (Montenegro) Radivoje Golubović
- (Montenegro) Miloš Radulović
- (Montenegro) Marko Vešović
- (Montenegro) Marko Vukčević
- (Wales) Daniel Alfei
- (Wales) Ryan Doble
- (Wales) Thomas Bradshaw

1 own goal

- (Andorra) Armand Fajardo (playing against Wales)
- (Andorra) Xavier Vieira (playing against Wales)
