= 2011–12 in Scottish football =

115th season of competitive football in Scotland

Football in Scotland
- Season: 2011–12

2011–12 in Scottish football

Premier League champions
- Celtic

First Division champions
- Ross County

Second Division champions
- Cowdenbeath

Third Division champions
- Alloa Athletic

Scottish Cup winners
- Heart of Midlothian

League Cup winners
- Kilmarnock

Challenge Cup winners
- Falkirk

Youth Cup winners
- Celtic

Teams in Europe
- Celtic, Dundee United, Heart of Midlothian, Rangers

Scotland national team
- Euro 2012 qualifying

The 2011–12 season was the 115th season of competitive football in Scotland.

== Overview ==
To be announced

== League competitions ==
=== Scottish Premier League ===
Pos	Team	Pld	W	D	L	GF	GA	GD	Pts	Qualification or relegation
1	Celtic (C)	38	30	3	5	84	21	+63	93	Qualification for the Champions League third qualifying round
2	Rangers (D, R)	38	26	5	7	77	28	+49	73	Refused SPL admission, accepted into the Third Division and disqualified from the Champions League third qualifying round (Note: Rangers were deducted 10 points for entering administration. As Rangers did not exit administration by 31 March, they were ineligible to compete in Europe in the 2012–13 season. Rangers were unable to agree a CVA with their creditors and the company entered proceedings to be liquidated. After a new company took over, Rangers were denied continued SPL membership and ended up in the 2012–13 Scottish Third Division in time for the start of the season.)
3	Motherwell	38	18	8	12	49	44	+5	62	Qualification for the Champions League third qualifying round
4	Dundee United	38	16	11	11	62	50	+12	59	Qualification for the Europa League third qualifying round
5	Heart of Midlothian	38	15	7	16	45	43	+2	52	Qualification for the Europa League play-off round (Note: Hearts qualified for the Europa League as 2011–12 Scottish Cup winners. Since they finished fifth in the league, the sixth-placed team, St Johnstone, also qualified for the Europa League.)
6	St Johnstone	38	14	8	16	43	50	−7	50	Qualification for the Europa League second qualifying round
7	Kilmarnock	38	11	14	13	44	61	−17	47	
8	St Mirren	38	9	16	13	39	51	−12	43	
9	Aberdeen	38	9	14	15	36	44	−8	41	
10	Inverness Caledonian Thistle	38	10	9	19	42	60	−18	39	
11	Hibernian	38	8	9	21	40	67	−27	33	
12	Dunfermline Athletic (R)	38	5	10	23	40	82	−42	25	Relegation to the First Division

Source: SPFL Archive
Rules for classification: 1) points; 2) goal difference; 3) number of goals scored.
(C) Champions; (D) Disqualified; (R) Relegated

=== Scottish First Division ===
Pos	Team	Pld	W	D	L	GF	GA	GD	Pts	Promotion, qualification or relegation
1	Ross County (C, P)	36	22	13	1	72	32	+40	79	Promotion to the Premier League
2	Dundee (P)	36	15	10	11	53	43	+10	55 (Note: Dundee were chosen to take the place of Rangers.)	Promotion to the Premier League
3	Falkirk	36	13	13	10	53	48	+5	52	
4	Hamilton Academical	36	14	7	15	55	56	−1	49	
5	Livingston	36	13	9	14	56	54	+2	48	
6	Partick Thistle	36	12	11	13	50	39	+11	47	
7	Raith Rovers	36	11	11	14	46	49	−3	44	
8	Greenock Morton	36	10	12	14	40	55	−15	42	
9	Ayr United (R)	36	9	11	16	44	67	−23	38	Qualification for the First Division play-offs
10	Queen of the South (R)	36	7	11	18	38	64	−26	32	Relegation to the Second Division

Source: SPFL Archive
Rules for classification: 1) points; 2) goal difference; 3) number of goals scored.
(C) Champions; (P) Promoted; (R) Relegated

=== Scottish Second Division ===
Pos	Team	Pld	W	D	L	GF	GA	GD	Pts	Promotion, qualification or relegation
1	Cowdenbeath (C, P)	36	20	11	5	68	29	+39	71	Promotion to the First Division
2	Arbroath	36	17	12	7	76	51	+25	63	Qualification for the First Division play-offs
3	Dumbarton (O, P)	36	17	7	12	61	61	0	58 (Note: Dumbarton won the First Division play-off final, and were promoted to the First Division.)	Qualification for the First Division play-offs
4	Airdrie United (P)	36	14	10	12	68	60	+8	52 (Note: Airdrie United lost the final of the First Division playoffs to Dumbarton. However following the demotion of Rangers to the third division prior to the beginning of the 2012-13 season, Dundee were promoted from the First Division to the SPL, and Airdrie United were promoted to the First Division to take their place. Stranraer were promoted from the Third to the Second Division to take the place of Airdrie United)	Qualification for the First Division play-offs
5	Stenhousemuir	36	15	6	15	54	49	+5	51	
6	East Fife	36	14	6	16	55	57	−2	48	
7	Forfar Athletic	36	11	9	16	59	72	−13	42	
8	Brechin City	36	10	11	15	47	62	−15	41	
9	Albion Rovers (O)	36	10	7	19	43	66	−23	37	Qualification for Second Division play-offs
10	Stirling Albion (R)	36	9	7	20	46	70	−24	34	Relegation to the Third Division

Source: SPFL Archive
Rules for classification: 1) points; 2) goal difference; 3) number of goals scored.
(C) Champions; (O) Play-off winners; (P) Promoted; (R) Relegated

=== Scottish Third Division ===
Pos	Team	Pld	W	D	L	GF	GA	GD	Pts	Promotion or qualification
1	Alloa Athletic (C, P)	36	23	8	5	70	39	+31	77	Promotion to the Second Division
2	Queen's Park	36	19	6	11	70	48	+22	63	Qualification for the Second Division Play-offs
3	Stranraer (P)	36	17	7	12	77	57	+20	58 (Note: Stranraer advanced to the final of the Second Division play-offs but were defeated by Albion Rovers, who retained their place in the Second Division. However, following the demotion of Rangers to the Third Division, Dundee were promoted from the First Division to the SPL, Airdrie United promoted from the Second to the First Division, and Stranraer were promoted from the Third to the Second Division.)	Qualification for the Second Division Play-offs
4	Elgin City	36	16	9	11	68	60	+8	57	Qualification for the Second Division Play-offs
5	Peterhead	36	15	6	15	51	53	−2	51	
6	Annan Athletic	36	13	10	13	53	53	0	49	
7	Berwick Rangers	36	12	12	12	61	58	+3	48	
8	Montrose	36	11	5	20	58	75	−17	38	
9	Clyde	36	8	11	17	35	50	−15	35	
10	East Stirlingshire	36	6	6	24	38	88	−50	24	

Source: SPFL Archive
Rules for classification: 1) points; 2) goal difference; 3) number of goals scored.
(C) Champions; (P) Promoted

=== Scottish Premier Under-19 League ===
Pos	Team	Pld	W	D	L	GF	GA	GD	Pts
1	Celtic (C)	22	18	3	1	66	18	+48	57
2	Heart of Midlothian	22	16	1	5	45	27	+18	49
3	Hibernian	22	14	2	6	49	30	+19	44
4	Aberdeen	22	11	6	5	42	23	+19	39
5	Rangers	22	11	4	7	42	28	+14	37
6	Motherwell	22	10	6	6	44	37	+7	36
7	Kilmarnock	22	8	0	14	40	51	−11	24
8	St Johnstone	22	7	3	12	33	45	−12	24
9	St Mirren	22	6	5	11	27	34	−7	23
10	Dunfermline Athletic (R)	22	6	1	15	22	47	−25	19
11	Dundee United	22	4	2	16	30	56	−26	14
12	Inverness Caledonian Thistle	22	3	3	16	23	67	−44	12

Updated to match(es) played on 4 May 2012. Source: Scotprem
Rules for classification: 1) points; 2) goal difference; 3) number of goals scored.
Team, which his senior will place 12th in Scottish Premier League at the end of this season, will be relegated from Scottish Premier Under-19 League and his place will be for youth team of new SPL club.
(C) Champions; (R) Relegated

== Honours ==
=== Cup honours ===
Competition	Winner	Score	Runner-up	Match report
2011–12 Scottish Cup	Heart of Midlothian	5 – 1	Hibernian	Report
2011–12 League Cup	Kilmarnock	1 – 0	Celtic	Report
2011–12 Challenge Cup	Falkirk	1 – 0	Hamilton Academical	Report
2011–12 Youth Cup	Celtic	8 – 0	Queen of the South	Report
2011–12 Junior Cup	Shotts Bon Accord	2 – 1	Auchinleck Talbot	Report

=== Non-league honours ===
==== Senior ====
Competition	Winner
2011–12 Highland League	Forres Mechanics
East of Scotland League	Stirling University
South of Scotland League	Dalbeattie Star

==== Junior ====
West Region

Division	Winner
2011-12 Premier Division	Irvine Meadow XI
Division One	Glenafton Athletic
Ayrshire League	Maybole
Central League Division One	Glasgow Perthshire
Central League Division Two	Carluke Rovers

East Region

Division	Winner
2011-12 Superleague	Bonnyrigg Rose Athletic
Premier League	Sauchie Juniors
North Division	Dundee Violet
Central Division	Jeanfield Swifts
South Division	Dalkeith Thistle

North Region

Division	Winner
2011-12 Superleague	Hermes
Division One	Inverness City
Division Two	Portgordon Victoria

=== Individual honours ===
==== PFA Scotland awards ====
Award	Winner	Team
Players' Player of the Year	Charlie Mulgrew	Celtic
Young Player of the Year	James Forrest	Celtic
Manager of the Year	Derek Adams	Ross County
First Division Player	Farid El Alagui	Falkirk
Second Division Player	Jon Robertson	Cowdenbeath
Third Division Player	Stevie May	Alloa Athletic on loan from St Johnstone

==== SFWA awards ====
Award	Winner	Team
Footballer of the Year	Charlie Mulgrew	Celtic
Young Player of the Year	James Forrest	Celtic
Manager of the Year	Neil Lennon	Celtic
International Player of the Year	James Morrison	West Bromwich Albion

== Scottish clubs in Europe ==
=== Summary ===
Club	Competitions	Started round	Final round	Coef.	Top Scorer
Rangers	UEFA Champions League	Third qualifying round	Third qualifying round	1.0	(United States) Carlos Bocanegra, 1 (Croatia) Nikica Jelavić, 1 (Spain) Juan Manuel Ortiz, 1
Rangers	UEFA Europa League	Play-off round	Play-off round	1.0	(United States) Carlos Bocanegra, 1 (Croatia) Nikica Jelavić, 1 (Spain) Juan Manuel Ortiz, 1
Celtic	UEFA Europa League	Play-off round	Group Stage	7.0	(England) Gary Hooper, 2 (Republic of Ireland) Anthony Stokes, 2
Heart of Midlothian	UEFA Europa League	Third qualifying round	Play-off round	2.0	(Scotland) Ryan Stevenson, 2
Dundee United	UEFA Europa League	Second qualifying round	Second qualifying round	1.0	(Republic of Ireland) Jon Daly, 1 (Scotland) David Goodwillie, 1 (Scotland) Keith Watson, 1
Total				11.0	
Average				2.750	

- Current UEFA coefficients: Ranking (No. 25)
- Celtic were reinstated taking Sion's place in Group I as the Swiss side fielded ineligible players during their tie. Celtic were awarded both of the matches as a 3–0 forfeit, resulting in a boost to their coefficient from 0.5 to 2.0.

=== Rangers ===
2011–12 UEFA Champions League

26 July 2011 Third qualifying round	Rangers (Scotland)	0 – 1	(Sweden) Malmö FF	Glasgow
19:45 BST (UTC+01)		BBC Sport	18' Larsson	Stadium: Ibrox Stadium; Attendance: 28,828; Referee: Antonio Mateu Lahoz (Spain)

3 August 2011 Third qualifying round	Malmö FF (Sweden)	1 – 1 (2 – 1 agg.)	(Scotland) Rangers	Malmö
18:00 BST (UTC+01)	Hamad 80'	BBC Sport	23' Jelavić	Stadium: Swedbank Stadion; Attendance: 19,084; Referee: Vladislav Bezborodov (Russia)

2011–12 UEFA Europa League

18 August 2011 Play-off round	NK Maribor (Slovenia)	2 – 1	(Scotland) Rangers	Ljudski vrt, Maribor
19:45 BST (UTC+01)	Ibraimi 52'; Velikonja 90+2'	BBC Sport	31' Ortiz	Attendance: 10,900; Referee: Manuel Gräfe (Germany)

25 August 2011 Play-off round	Rangers (Scotland)	1 – 1 (2 – 3 agg.)	(Slovenia) Maribor	Ibrox Stadium, Glasgow
19:30 BST (UTC+01)	Bocanegra 75'	BBC Sport	55' Volaš	Attendance: 32,223; Referee: Aleksandar Stavrev (Macedonia)

=== Celtic ===
2011–12 UEFA Europa League

Sion defeated Celtic in the initial two-legged tie by an aggregate score of 3–1. Celtic had played both games under protest to UEFA after Sion fielded five ineligible players over the two games. Sion were forced to forfeit both ties against Celtic after UEFA found them guilty of the charge, with UEFA awarding Celtic 3–0 wins in both legs.

18 August 2011 Play-off round	Celtic (Scotland)	3 – 0	(Switzerland) Sion	Glasgow
20:05 BST (UTC+01)		BBC Sport		Stadium: Celtic Park; Attendance: 51,975; Referee: Marijo Strahonja (Croatia)

25 August 2011 Play-off round	Sion (Switzerland)	0 – 3 (0 – 6 agg.)	(Scotland) Celtic	Sion
19:30 BST (UTC+01)		BBC Sport		Stadium: Stade de Tourbillon; Attendance: 10,145; Referee: David Fernández Borbalán (Spain)

15 September 2011 Group stage	Atlético Madrid (Spain)	2 – 0	(Scotland) Celtic	Madrid
20:05 BST (UTC+01)	Falcao 3'; Diego 68'	Report		Stadium: Vicente Calderón Stadium; Attendance: 24,868; Referee: Peter Rasmussen (Denmark)

29 September 2011 Group stage	Celtic (Scotland)	1 – 1	(Italy) Udinese	Glasgow
18:00 BST (UTC+01)	Ki 3' (pen.)	Report	88' (pen.) Abdi	Stadium: Celtic Park; Attendance: 28,476; Referee: Bülent Yıldırım (Turkey)

20 October 2011 Group stage	Rennes (France)	1 – 1	(Scotland) Celtic	Rennes
18:00 BST (UTC+01)	Cha 30' (o.g.)	Report	70' Ledley	Stadium: Stade de la Route de Lorient; Attendance: 21,825; Referee: Robert Malek (Poland)

3 November 2011 Group stage	Celtic (Scotland)	3 – 1	(France) Rennes	Glasgow
20:05 GMT (UTC)	Stokes 30', 43'; Hooper 82'	Report	2' Mangane	Stadium: Celtic Park; Attendance: 28,578; Referee: Bruno Paixão (Portugal)

30 November 2011 Group stage	Celtic (Scotland)	0 – 1	(Spain) Atlético Madrid	Glasgow
18:00 GMT (UTC)		Report	30' Turan	Stadium: Celtic Park; Attendance: 33,257; Referee: Eric Braamhaar (Netherlands)

15 December 2011 Group stage	Udinese (Italy)	1 – 1	(Scotland) Celtic	Udine
20:05 GMT (UTC)	45' Di Natale	Report	29' Hooper	Stadium: Stadio Friuli; Attendance: 15,000; Referee: Michael Koukoulakis (Greece)

=== Heart of Midlothian ===
2011–12 UEFA Europa League

28 July 2011 Third qualifying round	Paksi SE (Hungary)	1 – 1	(Scotland) Heart of Midlothian	Székesfehérvár
19:00 BST (UTC+01)	Sipeki 32'	BBC Sport	45+2' (pen.) Hamill	Stadium: Stadion Sóstói; Attendance: 3,500; Referee: Mattias Gestranius (Finland)

4 August 2011 Third qualifying round	Heart of Midlothian (Scotland)	4 – 1 (5 – 2 agg.)	(Hungary) Paksi SE	Edinburgh
19:45 BST (UTC+01)	Setevenson 34', 45+1'; Driver 50'; Skácel 76'	BBC Sport	89' Böde	Stadium: Tynecastle Stadium; Attendance: 12,811; Referee: Robert Malek (Poland)

18 August 2011 Play-off round	Heart of Midlothian (Scotland)	0 – 5	(England) Tottenham Hotspur	Edinburgh
19:45 BST (UTC+01)		BBC Sport	5' Van der Vaart; 13' Defoe; 28' Livermore; 63' Bale; 78' Lennon	Stadium: Tynecastle Stadium; Attendance: 16,279; Referee: Paolo Tagliavento (Italy)

25 August 2011 Play-off round	Tottenham Hotspur (England)	0 – 0 (5 – 0 agg.)	(Scotland) Heart of Midlothian	London
20:00 BST (UTC+01)		BBC Sport		Stadium: White Hart Lane; Attendance: 32,590; Referee: Anastassios Kakos (Greece)

=== Dundee United ===
2011–12 UEFA Europa League

14 July 2011 Second qualifying round	Śląsk Wrocław (Poland)	1 – 0	(Scotland) Dundee United	Wrocław
15:45 BST (UTC+01)	Voskamp 32'	BBC Sport		Stadium: Stadion Oporowska; Attendance: 8,300; Referee: Tom Harald Hagen (Norway)

21 July 2011 Second qualifying round	Dundee United (Scotland)	3 – 2 (3 – 3 agg.)	(Poland) Śląsk Wrocław	Dundee
19:45 BST (UTC+01)	Watson 2'; Goodwillie 5'; Daly 44' (pen.)	BBC Sport	14' Elsner; 74' Dudek	Stadium: Tannadice Park; Attendance: 11,306; Referee: Antonio Mateu Lahoz (Spain)

== National teams ==
=== Scotland national team ===
10 August 2011 Friendly	Scotland	2 – 1	Denmark	Hampden Park, Glasgow
19.45 BST (UTC+01)	Kvist 22' (o.g.); Snodgrass 43'	Scottish FA	30' Eriksen	Attendance: 17,582; Referee: Marco Borg (Malta)

3 September 2011 Qualifying group I	Scotland	2 – 2	Czech Republic	Hampden Park, Glasgow
15.00 BST (UTC+01)	K. Miller 44'; D. Fletcher 83'	BBC Sport	78' Plašil; 90' (pen.) Kadlec	Attendance: 51,457; Referee: Kevin Blom (Netherlands)

6 September 2011 Qualifying group I	Scotland	1 – 0	Lithuania	Hampden Park, Glasgow
20.00 BST (UTC+01)	Naismith 50'	BBC Sport		Attendance: 34,071; Referee: Kristinn Jakobsson (Iceland)

8 October 2011 Qualifying group I	Liechtenstein	0 – 1	Scotland	Rheinpark Stadion, Vaduz
18:30		BBC Sport	32' Mackail-Smith	Attendance: 5,636; Referee: Tom Harald Hagen (Norway)

11 October 2011 Qualifying group I	Spain	3 – 1	Scotland	Estadio José Rico Pérez, Alicante
19:45	Silva 6', 44'; Villa 54'	BBC Sport	66' (pen.) Goodwillie	Attendance: 24,896; Referee: Stefan Johannesson (Sweden)

11 November 2011 Friendly	Cyprus	1 – 2	Scotland	Antonis Papadopoulos Stadium, Larnaca
18:00	Christofi 59'	BBC Sport	23' K. Miller; 56' Mackie	Attendance: 2,000; Referee: Meir Levi (Israel)

29 February 2012 Friendly	Slovenia	1 – 1	Scotland	Bonifika Stadium, Koper
19:45 GMT	Kirm 32'		39' Berra	Referee: Aleksandar Stavrev (Macedonia)

27 May 2012 Friendly	United States	5 – 1	Scotland	EverBank Field, Jacksonville
01:00 BST	Donovan 4', 60', 65'; Bradley 11'; Jones 70'		15' (o.g.) Cameron	Referee: Elmer Bonilla (El Salvador)

=== Scotland Under-21 team ===
10 August 2011 Friendly	Scotland	3 – 0	Norway	St Mirren Park, Paisley
16.00 BST (UTC+01)	Cairney 17'; Jack 76'; Armstrong 80'	Scottish FA		Attendance: 1,654

5 September 2011 Qualifying group 10	Scotland	0 – 0	Bulgaria	St Mirren Park, Paisley
19.30 BST (UTC+01)		Scottish FA		Attendance: 2,769; Referee: Kristo Tohver Estonia

6 October 2011 Qualifying group 10	Luxembourg	1 – 5	Scotland	Stade Josy Barthel, Luxembourg
18:30	Almeida 82'	Scottish FA	29' MacDonald; 34', 43', 64' Rhodes; 88' Hanlon	Attendance: 320; Referee: Clayton Pisani (Malta)

10 October 2011 Qualifying group 10	Scotland	2 – 2	Austria	St Mirren Park, Paisley
19:30	Rhodes 37', 64'	BBC Sport	15' Weimann; 42' Alar	Attendance: 3,058; Referee: Ante Vučemilović-Šimunović Jr. (Croatia)

14 November 2011 Qualifying group 10	Netherlands	1 – 2	Scotland	Stadion de Goffert, Nijmegen
17:30	Maher 12'	BBC Sport	2' Rhodes; 55' Wotherspoon	Attendance: 8,000; Referee: Vladimir Kazmenko (Russia)

29 February 2012 Qualifying group 10	Scotland	0 – 0	Netherlands	St Mirren Park, Paisley
17:30		UEFA		Attendance: 6,607; Referee: Clément Turpin (France)

25 April 2012 Friendly	Scotland	1 – 4	Italy	Easter Road, Edinburgh
19.00 BST	Mackay-Steven 32'	Scottish FA	7' Florenzi; 55' Verratti; 75' Insigne; 89' Longo	Attendance: 4,665; Referee: Michael Oliver (England)

31 May 2012 Qualifying group 10	Bulgaria	2 – 2	Scotland	Lovech Stadium, Lovech
19:30	Milanov 33'; Kostadinov 90+3'	UEFA	69', 90' Rhodes	Referee: Artur Soares Dias (Portugal)

== Women's football ==
=== League and Cup honours ===
Division	Winner
2011 Scottish Women's Premier League	Glasgow City
SWFL First Division	Aberdeen
SWFL Second Division North	Buchan
SWFL Second Division West	Kilwinning Sports Club
SWFL Second Division East	Forfar Farmington Ladies

Competition	Winner	Score	Runner-up	Match report
2011 Scottish Women's Cup	Glasgow City	3 – 0	Hibernian	Report
2011 Scottish Women's Premier League Cup	Hibernian	5 – 2	Spartans	Report
Scottish Women's Football League Cup	Aberdeen	2 – 1	Toryglen	

=== Individual honours ===
==== SWF awards ====
Award	Winner	Team
Players' Player of the Year	Shannon Lynn	Hibernian
International Player of the Year	Megan Sneddon	Celtic
Manager of the Year	Eddie Wolecki-Black	Glasgow City
Premier Division Player of the Year	Emma Lyons	Falkirk
First Division Player	Caroline Weir	Hibernian 2000
Second Division Player	Sam McManus	Kilwinning Sports Club

=== Scotland women's national team ===
21 August 2011 Friendly	Scotland	5 – 0	Switzerland	Falkirk Stadium, Falkirk
13:00 BST (UTC+01)	Jane Ross 14', 22'; Julie Fleeting 20'; Kim Little 30' (pen.); Jen Beattie 72'	Scottish FA		Attendance: 531; Referee: Morag Pirie (Scotland)

23 August 2011 Friendly	Scotland	1 – 0	Belgium	Falkirk Stadium, Falkirk
19:00 BST (UTC+01)	Julie Fleeting 3'	Scottish FA		Referee: Lorraine Clark (Scotland)

18 September 2011 Friendly	Finland	1 – 0	Scotland	Sonera Stadium, Helsinki
17:00	Linda Sällström 65'	Scottish FA

21 September 2011 Friendly	Scotland	7 – 2	Finland	Tynecastle Stadium, Edinburgh
19:30	Hayley Lauder 2'; Jen Beattie 30', 42'; Jane Ross 38', 50'; Rachel Corsie 47'; Katri Nokso-Koivisto 76' (o.g.)	Scottish FA	16' (o.g.) Rhonda Jones; 75' Marianna Tolvanen

12 October 2011 Qualifying group 4	Israel	1 – 6	Scotland	Ness Ziona Stadium, Ness Ziona
10:00	Moran Lavi 35'	Scottish FA	5' Jane Ross; 9' Jen Beattie; 48', 57' Kim Little; 69' Hayley Lauder; 72' (o.g.) Michal Ravitz	Referee: Ausra Kance (Lithuania)

27 October 2011 Qualifying group 4	Scotland	2 – 2	Wales	Tynecastle Stadium, Edinburgh
19:00	Jane Ross 18'; Jen Beattie 43'	Scottish FA	3' Amie Lea; 25' Helen Lander	Referee: Tanja Schett (Austria)

5 February 2012 Friendly	Northern Ireland	1 – 5	Scotland	Solitude, Belfast
14:00	Rachel Furness 48'	Scottish FA	14', 83', 87', 89' Jen Beattie; 75' Lisa Evans

28 February 2012 Cyprus Cup Group B	Canada	5 – 1	Scotland	GSZ Stadium, Larnaca
17:30	Kelly Parker 6'; Sophie Schmidt 36', 51'; Christine Sinclair 59'; Melissa Tancredi 64'	She Kicks	13' Jane Ross

1 March 2012 Cyprus Cup Group B	Scotland	2 – 1	Netherlands	GSP Stadium, Nicosia
13:30	Mandy van den Berg 26' (o.g.); Hayley Lauder 59'		24' Sherida Spitse

4 March 2012 Cyprus Cup Group B	Italy	2 – 1	Scotland	GSZ Stadium, Larnaca
14:30	Ania Guagni 43'; Melania Gabbiadini 69'	Scottish FA	67' Leanne Ross

6 March 2012 9th/10th place play-off	Scotland	2 – 0	South Africa	Paralimni Stadium, Paralimni
12:00	Kim Little 8', 25' (pen.)

31 March 2012 Qualifying group 4	France	2 – 0	Scotland	Stade Jules Deschaseaux, Le Havre
19:50	Ifeoma Dieke 64' (o.g.); Wendie Renard 70'	UEFA		Referee: Jana Adámková (Czech Republic)

5 April 2012 Qualifying group 4	Scotland	2 – 1	Republic of Ireland	Tynecastle Stadium, Edinburgh
19:00	Rhonda Jones 86'; Christie Murray 87'	Scottish FA	4' Denise O'Sullivan	Attendance: 1,703; Referee: Katalin Kulcsár (Hungary)

9 May 2012 Friendly	Poland	1 – 3	Scotland	Stadion Kazimierza Deyny, Starogard Gdański
17:00	Agnieszka Winczo 55'	Scottish FA	13' Lisa Evans; 19' Jane Ross; 67' (o.g.) Jolanta Siwińska

26 May 2012 Friendly	Scotland	1 – 4	Sweden	Stark's Park, Kirkcaldy
15:00	Kim Little 45' (pen.)	Scottish FA	13', 25' Lotta Schelin; 52', 67' Sofia Jakobsson	Attendance: 1,184; Referee: Morag Pirie (Scotland)

=== Glasgow City ===
2011–12 UEFA Women's Champions League

11 August 2011 Qualifying round	Glasgow City (Scotland)	4 – 0	(Serbia) ŽFK Spartak-Jafa	Subotica City Stadium, Subotica
16:30 BST (UTC+01)	Christie Murray 7', 28'; Katharina Lindner 23', 90+3'	Report		Attendance: 1,000; Referee: Kateryna Monzul (Ukraine)

13 August 2011 Qualifying round	Glasgow City (Scotland)	8 – 0	(Malta) Mosta	Subotica City Stadium, Subotica
14:00 BST (UTC+01)	Jane Ross 15', 47'; Emma Mitchell 33'; Danica Dalziel 38'; Leanne Ross 42' (pen.); Emma Woolley 51'; Lisa Evans 60'; Rachel Corsie 84'	Report		Referee: Sofia Karagiorgi (Cyprus)

16 August 2011 Qualifying round	KÍ Klaksvík (Faroe Islands)	0 – 5	(Scotland) Glasgow City	Bačka Stadium, Subotica
16:00 BST (UTC+01)		Report	4', 8' Katharina Lindner; 13' Leanne Ross; 41' Joanne Love; 64' Eilish McSorley	Referee: Kateryna Monzul (Ukraine)

29 September 2011 Round of 32	Glasgow City (Scotland)	1 – 1	(Iceland) Valur	Petershill Park, Glasgow
19:45	Lisa Evans 16'	UEFA	59' Laufey Ólafsdóttir	Attendance: 738; Referee: Sandra Braz Bastos (Portugal)

6 October 2011 Round of 32	Valur (Iceland)	0 – 3	(Scotland) Glasgow City	Hlíðarendi, Reykjavík
17:00		UEFA	10' (o.g.) Hallbera Gísladóttir; 60', 62' Lisa Evans	Referee: Gyöngyi Krisztina Gaál (Hungary)

2 November 2011 Round of 16	1. FFC Turbine Potsdam (Germany)	10 – 0	(Scotland) Glasgow City	Karl Liebknecht Stadion, Potsdam
17:00 (CET)	Genoveva Añonma 2', 47'; Bianca Schmidt 15'; Anja Mittag 25', 72', 75'; Yūki Nagasato 51', 55'; Chantal de Ridder 78'; Amy McDonald 81' (o.g.)	UEFA		Attendance: 1,750; Referee: Esther Staubli (Switzerland)

10 November 2011 Round of 16	Glasgow City (Scotland)	0 – 7	(Germany) 1. FFC Turbine Potsdam	Petershill Park, Glasgow
18:05 (GMT)		Report	5', 41' Chantal de Ridder; 10', 62' Anja Mittag; 20' Kristin Demann; 74' Stefanie Draws; 89' Isabel Kerschowski	Referee: Cristina Dorcioman (Romania)

== Deaths ==
- 1 July: Willie Fernie, 82, Celtic and Scotland forward; Kilmarnock manager.
- 31 July: Willie Corbett, 88, Celtic, Dunfermline and Morton defender.
- 16 August: Frank Munro, 63, Dundee United, Aberdeen, Celtic and Scotland defender.
- 27 August: John Parke, 74, Hibs defender.
- 28 August: Bernie Gallacher, 44, Aston Villa defender.
- 7 September: Derek Grierson, 79, Queen's Park, Rangers and Falkirk forward.
- 20 November: David Cargill, 75, Arbroath winger.
- 6 December: Lawrie Tierney, 52, Hearts and Hibs midfielder.
- 9 January: Bill Dickie, 82, Motherwell director; Scottish Football Association president.
- 14 February: Tom McAnearney, 79, Sheffield Wednesday player.
- 28 April: Tom Spence, 50, Stirling Albion defender; Albion Rovers manager.
- 4 June: Bobby Black, 85, East Fife and Queen of the South winger.
- 22 June: Jackie Neilson, 83, St Mirren wing half.
