= 2013 UEFA European Under-21 Championship qualification Group 9 =

Football tournament qualification stage

The teams competing in Group 9 of the 2013 UEFA European Under-21 Championship qualifying competition were France, Kazakhstan, Latvia, Romania, and Slovakia.

== Standings ==
Pos	Team	Pld	W	D	L	GF	GA	GD	Pts	Qualification	(France)	(Slovakia)	(Romania)	(Kazakhstan)	(Latvia)
1	France	8	7	0	1	19	2	+17	21	Play-offs	—	2–0	3–0	2–0	3–0
2	Slovakia	8	5	0	3	17	7	+10	15	Play-offs	2–1	—	0–2	6–0	2–0
3	Romania	8	4	2	2	11	6	+5	14		0–2	2–0	—	0–0	2–0
4	Kazakhstan	8	0	4	4	2	14	−12	4		0–3	0–1	1–1	—	0–0
5	Latvia	8	0	2	6	1	21	−20	2		0–3	0–6	0–4	1–1	—

== Results and fixtures ==
3 June 2011
17:00

Romania	0–0	Kazakhstan
	Report

Stadionul Trans-Sil, Târgu Mureş
Referee: Sergejus Slyva (Lithuania)
3 June 2011
18:00

Slovakia	2–0	Latvia
Vavrík 9'; Štetina 90+4'	Report

Štadión FC ViOn, Zlaté Moravce
Attendance: 1426
Referee: Damir Batinić (Croatia)

2 September 2011
15:00

Kazakhstan	1–1	Romania
Beisebekov 74'	Report	Grozav 30'

Almaty Central Stadium, Almaty
Referee: Sergiy Dankovskyy (Ukraine)
2 September 2011
16:45

Latvia	0–3	France
	Report	Joseph-Monrose 33'; Mangala 63'; Niang 86'

Skonto Stadium, Riga
Attendance: 935
Referee: Szymon Marciniak (Poland)

6 September 2011
15:00

Kazakhstan	0–1	Slovakia
	Report	Šimonek 75'

Almaty Central Stadium, Almaty
Referee: Aleksei Eskov (Russia)
6 September 2011
18:00

Romania	2–0	Latvia
Stanciu 39'; Țucudean 52'	Report

Stadionul Gaz Metan, Mediaș
Attendance: 3000
Referee: Alain Bieri (Switzerland)

7 October 2011
16:45

France	2–0	Kazakhstan
Guilavogui 26', 55'	Report

Stade Gabriel Montpied, Clermont-Ferrand
Referee: Kenn Hansen (Denmark)

11 October 2011
14:00

Latvia	0–6	Slovakia
	Report	Kolmokov 1'; Greguš 42'; Čonka 49'; Vavrík 51', 85'; Šimonek 67'

Zemgale Olympic Center, Jelgava
Attendance: 327
Referee: Ognjen Valjić (Bosnia and Herzegovina)
11 October 2011
18:00

Romania	0–2	France
	Report	Rivière 16', 43'

Stadionul Ceahlăul, Piatra Neamţ
Referee: Aleksei Eskov (Russia)

10 November 2011
20:45

France	3–0	Romania
Cabella 37'; Lacazette 72'; Corchia 80'	Report

Stade de la Beaujoire, Nantes
Referee: Roman Hrubeš (Czech Republic)

14 November 2011
20:45

France	2–0	Slovakia
Mangala 33'; Varane 63'	Report

Jean-Bouin Stadium, Angers
Referee: Artur Soares Dias (Portugal)

1 June 2012
19:30

Slovakia	0–2	Romania
	Report	Enache 71', 79'

Mestsky Zemplin, Michalovce
Referee: Antti Munukka (Finland)
2 June 2012
20:50

France	3–0	Latvia
Pajot 34' (pen.); Griezmann 56'; Joseph-Monrose 77'	Report

Stade Louis Dugauguez, Sedan
Attendance: 7115
Referee: Suren Baliyan (Armenia)

5 June 2012
17:00

Romania	2–0	Slovakia
Răduț 66' (pen.); Filip 89'	Report

Stadionul Mogoşoaia, Mogoşoaia
Referee: Jakob Kehlet (Denmark)
8 June 2012
16:45

Kazakhstan	0–3	France
	Report	Cabella 14'; Griezmann 62'; Lacazette 85'

Astana Arena, Astana
Referee: Oliver Drachta (Austria)

12 June 2012
15:00

Kazakhstan	0–0	Latvia
	Report

Astana Arena, Astana
Attendance: 6500
Referee: Elmir Pilav (Bosnia and Herzegovina)

6 September 2012
16:00

Latvia	1–1	Kazakhstan
Rakels 75'	Report	Kuantayev 57'

Zemgale Olympic Center, Jelgava
Attendance: 600
Referee: Bardhyl Pashaj (Albania)
7 September 2012
18:45

Slovakia	2–1	France
Žilák 21'; Oršula 67'	Report	Varane 4'

NTC Senec, Senec
Referee: Steven McLean (Scotland)

10 September 2012
18:00

Latvia	0–4	Romania
	Report	Alexe 11'; Matei 52'; Răduț 72', 81'

Skonto Stadium, Riga
Attendance: 250
Referee: Alexandre Boucaut (Belgium)
10 September 2012
18:00

Slovakia	6–0	Kazakhstan
Mak 13' (pen.), 45+2'; Štetina 35'; Oršula 68'; Kolčák 88'; Lalkovič 90'	Report

NTC Senec, Senec
Referee: Nerijus Dunauskas (Lithuania)

== Goalscorers ==
3 goals

- (Romania) Mihai Răduț
- (Slovakia) Juraj Vavrík

2 goals

- (France) Rémy Cabella
- (France) Josuha Guilavogui
- (France) Antoine Griezmann
- (France) Steeven Joseph-Monrose
- (France) Alexandre Lacazette
- (France) Eliaquim Mangala
- (France) Emmanuel Rivière
- (France) Raphaël Varane
- (Romania) Gabriel Enache
- (Slovakia) Róbert Mak
- (Slovakia) Filip Oršula
- (Slovakia) Arnold Šimonek
- (Slovakia) Lukáš Štetina

1 goal

- (France) Sébastien Corchia
- (France) M'Baye Niang
- (France) Vincent Pajot
- (Kazakhstan) Abzal Beisebekov
- (Kazakhstan) Ermek Kuantayev
- (Latvia) Deniss Rakels
- (Romania) Marius Alexe
- (Romania) Lucian Filip
- (Romania) Gheorghe Grozav
- (Romania) Cosmin Matei
- (Romania) Nicolae Stanciu
- (Romania) George Țucudean
- (Slovakia) Matúš Čonka
- (Slovakia) Ján Greguš
- (Slovakia) Kristián Kolčák
- (Slovakia) Marián Kolmokov
- (Slovakia) Milan Lalkovič
- (Slovakia) Adam Žilák
