= 2013 UEFA European Under-21 Championship qualification Group 5 =

Football tournament qualification stage

The teams competing in Group 5 of the 2013 UEFA European Under-21 Championship qualifying competition were Croatia, Estonia, Georgia, Spain, and Switzerland.

== Standings ==
Pos	Team	Pld	W	D	L	GF	GA	GD	Pts	Qualification	(Spain)	(Switzerland)	(Georgia (country))	(Croatia)	(Estonia)
1	Spain	8	7	1	0	27	2	+25	22	Play-offs	—	3–0	2–0	6–0	6–0
2	Switzerland	8	5	2	1	15	4	+11	17	Play-offs	0–0	—	5–0	4–0	3–0
3	Georgia	8	3	1	4	8	18	−10	10		2–7	0–1	—	1–1	2–1
4	Croatia	8	2	1	5	7	16	−9	7		0–2	1–2	0–1	—	4–0
5	Estonia	8	0	1	7	2	19	−17	1		0–1	0–0	1–2	0–1	—

== Results and fixtures ==
3 June 2011
16:00

Croatia	0–1	Georgia
	Report	Tarkhnishvili 5'

Stadion Hrvatski vitezovi, Dugopolje
Referee: Ilias Spathas (Greece)

1 September 2011
18:00

Estonia	0–0	Switzerland
	Report

Lilleküla Stadium, Tallinn
Attendance: 155
Referee: Anar Salmanov (Azerbaijan)
1 September 2011
18:30

Georgia	2–7	Spain
Martínez 52' (o.g.); Kvekveskiri 87'	Report	Isco 3', 21'; Rodrigo 11', 29', 30'; Canales 39'; Bartra 61'

Givi Kiladze Stadium, Kutaisi
Referee: Stuart Attwell (England)

5 September 2011
19:30

Switzerland	4–0	Croatia
Zuber 8'; Toko 62'; Kasami 79'; Seferovic 81'	Report

Stade Tourbillon, Sion
Referee: Halis Özkahya (Turkey)
5 September 2011
20:45

Spain	2–0	Georgia
Canales 17' (pen.), 79'	Report

Estadio Anxo Carro, Lugo
Referee: István Kovács (Romania)

6 October 2011
20:30

Croatia	0–2	Spain
	Report	Koke 18'; Rodrigo 57'

Stadion Gradski vrt, Osijek
Referee: Steven McLean (Scotland)
7 October 2011
19:00

Georgia	0–1	Switzerland
	Report	Affolter 56'

Mikheil Meskhi Stadium, Tbilisi
Referee: Alexander Kostadinov (Bulgaria)

10 October 2011
15:00

Estonia	0–1	Croatia
	Report	Vukušić 89' (pen.)

Tamme Stadium, Tartu
Referee: Ioannis Anastasiou (Cyprus)

10 November 2011
19:00

Switzerland	5–0	Georgia
Zuber 8', 33', 42'; Ben Khalifa 13'; Koch 64'	Report

Cornaredo Stadium, Lugano
Referee: Sergey Tsinkevich (Belarus)
10 November 2011
20:45

Spain	6–0	Estonia
Rodrigo 3', 7', 45'; Isco 59'; Vázquez 90'; Sarabia 90+3'	Report

Estadio Municipal Álvarez Claro, Melilla
Referee: Anastasios Sidiropoulos (Greece)

14 November 2011
17:00

Croatia	4–0	Estonia
Čop 14'; Vukušić 42', 81'; Ademi 75'	Report

Stadion Aldo Drosina, Pula
Referee: Oleksandr Derdo (Ukraine)
14 November 2011
20:00

Spain	3–0	Switzerland
Muniain 8'; Thiago 26' (pen.); Bartra 45+1'	Report

Estadio Nuevo Arcángel, Córdoba
Referee: Paolo Valeri (Italy)

31 May 2012
18:00

Estonia	0–1	Spain
	Report	Isco 40'

Lilleküla Stadium, Tallinn
Attendance: 205
Referee: Dawid Piasecki (Poland)
2 June 2012
16:30

Croatia	1–2	Switzerland
Glavica 73'	Report	Seferovic 15'; Drmić 90+2'

Gradski stadion, Koprivnica
Referee: Martin Strömbergsson (Sweden)

5 June 2012
16:30

Estonia	1–2	Georgia
Reintam 81'	Report	Okriashvili 12'; Kenia 26'

Lilleküla Stadium, Tallinn
Attendance: 65
Referee: Tolga Özkalfa (Turkey)

15 August 2012
18:00

Georgia	1–1	Croatia
Skhirtladze 20'	Report	Kramarić 37'

Mikheil Meskhi Stadium, Tbilisi
Referee: Anatoliy Abdula (Ukraine)

6 September 2012
17:00

Georgia	2–1	Estonia
Dzalamidze 28'; Parunashvili 83'	Report	Taar 35'

Mikheil Meskhi Stadium, Tbilisi
Referee: Aleksandr Gauzer (Kazakhstan)
6 September 2012
19:30

Switzerland	0–0	Spain
	Report

Stade Tourbillon, Sion
Referee: Artur Soares (Portugal)

10 September 2012
20:15

Spain	6–0	Croatia
Sarabia 3'; Deulofeu 10'; Vázquez 17', 81'; Isco 34'; Montoya 38'	Report

Estadio José Rico Pérez, Alicante
Referee: Serdar Gözübüyük (Netherlands)
10 September 2012
20:15

Switzerland	3–0	Estonia
Schär 15'; Zuber 51' (pen.); Seferovic 88'	Report

Arena Thun, Thun
Referee: Mitja Žganec (Slovenia)

== Goalscorers ==
7 goals

- (Spain) Rodrigo

5 goals

- (Spain) Isco
- (Switzerland) Steven Zuber

3 goals

- (Croatia) Ante Vukušić
- (Spain) Sergio Canales
- (Spain) Álvaro Vázquez
- (Switzerland) Haris Seferovic

2 goals

- (Spain) Marc Bartra
- (Spain) Pablo Sarabia

1 goal

- (Croatia) Arijan Ademi
- (Croatia) Duje Čop
- (Croatia) Dejan Glavica
- (Croatia) Andrej Kramarić
- (Georgia (country)) Nika Dzalamidze
- (Georgia (country)) Levan Kenia
- (Georgia (country)) Nika Kvekveskiri
- (Georgia (country)) Tornike Okriashvili
- (Georgia (country)) Lasha Parunashvili
- (Georgia (country)) Davit Skhirtladze
- (Georgia (country)) Tornike Tarkhnishvili
- (Estonia) Mikk Reintam
- (Estonia) Albert Taar
- (Spain) Thiago
- (Spain) Gerard Deulofeu
- (Spain) Koke
- (Spain) Iker Muniain
- (Spain) Martín Montoya
- (Switzerland) François Affolter
- (Switzerland) Nassim Ben Khalifa
- (Switzerland) Josip Drmić
- (Switzerland) Pajtim Kasami
- (Switzerland) Raphael Koch
- (Switzerland) Fabian Schär
- (Switzerland) Nzuzi Toko

1 own goal

- (Spain) Iñigo Martínez (playing against Georgia)
