= Miloš Radulović =

Miloš Radulović may refer to:

- Miloš Radulović (footballer)
- Miloš Radulović (politician)
