= 2013 UEFA European Under-21 Championship qualification Group 10 =

Football tournament qualification stage

The teams competing in Group 10 of the 2013 UEFA European Under-21 Championship qualifying competition were Austria, Bulgaria, Luxembourg, Netherlands, and Scotland.

== Standings ==
Pos	Team	Pld	W	D	L	GF	GA	GD	Pts	Qualification	(Netherlands)	(Scotland)	(Bulgaria)	(Austria)	(Luxembourg)
1	Netherlands	8	6	1	1	21	3	+18	19	Play-offs	—	1–2	5–0	4–1	4–0
2	Scotland	8	3	4	1	16	9	+7	13		0–0	—	0–0	2–2	3–0
3	Bulgaria	8	3	3	2	11	12	−1	12		0–1	2–2	—	1–1	3–2
4	Austria	8	3	2	3	15	14	+1	11		0–1	3–2	0–2	—	4–1
5	Luxembourg	8	0	0	8	6	31	−25	0		0–5	1–5	1–3	1–4	—

== Results and fixtures ==
1 September 2011
18:30

Luxembourg	1–4	Austria
Philipps 23'	Report	Holzhauser 41'; Weimann 45+1', 90'; Alar 51'

Stade de la Frontière, Esch-sur-Alzette
Referee: Aleksander Gauzer (Kazakhstan)
1 September 2011
19:40

Bulgaria	0–1	Netherlands
	Report	Zeefuik 78'

Lovech Stadium, Lovech
Referee: Ruddy Buquet (France)

5 September 2011
20:30

Scotland	0–0	Bulgaria
	Report

St Mirren Park, Paisley
Referee: Kristo Tohver (Estonia)
6 September 2011
18:30

Netherlands	4–0	Luxembourg
Zeefuik 8', 57'; Fer 79' (pen.); Van Haaren 84'	Report

De Adelaarshorst, Deventer
Referee: Marios Panayi (Cyprus)

6 October 2011
19:00

Austria	0–1	Netherlands
	Report	Barazite 7'

Tivoli-Neu, Innsbruck
Referee: Ken Henry Johnsen (Norway)
6 October 2011
19:30

Luxembourg	1–5	Scotland
Almeida 82'	Report	MacDonald 29'; Rhodes 34', 43', 64'; Hanlon 88'

Stade Josy Barthel, Luxembourg
Referee: Clayton Pisani (Malta)

10 October 2011
20:30

Scotland	2–2	Austria
Rhodes 37', 64'	Report	Weimann 15'; Alar 42'

St Mirren Park, Paisley
Referee: Ante Vučemilović-Šimunović Jr. (Croatia)
11 October 2011
18:00

Bulgaria	3–2	Luxembourg
Tsvetanov 22'; T. Kostadinov 39' (pen.); Milanov 55'	Report	Jans 38'; Martino 90+5'

Lovech Stadium, Lovech
Referee: Levan Kvaratskhelia (Georgia)

10 November 2011
18:00

Austria	0–2	Bulgaria
	Report	Tsvetanov 1'; Kolev 9'

Stadion Wiener Neustadt, Wiener Neustadt
Referee: Ievgenii Aranovskyi (Ukraine)

14 November 2011
18:30

Netherlands	1–2	Scotland
Maher 12'	Report	Rhodes 2'; Wotherspoon 55'

Stadion de Goffert, Nijmegen
Referee: Vladimir Kazmenko (Russia)
15 November 2011
16:00

Bulgaria	1–1	Austria
Tonev 12'	Report	Dibon 78'

Lovech Stadium, Lovech
Referee: Tolga Özkalfa (Turkey)

29 February 2012
18:30

Scotland	0–0	Netherlands
	Report

St Mirren Park, Paisley
Referee: Clément Turpin (France)

31 May 2011
18:30

Bulgaria	2–2	Scotland
Milanov 33'; G. Kostadinov 90+3'	Report	Rhodes 69', 90'

Lovech Stadium, Lovech
Referee: Artur Soares Dias (Portugal)
1 June 2012
18:30

Luxembourg	0–5	Netherlands
	Report	Clasie 1'; Zeefuik 3' (pen.), 63', 82'; Fer 37' (pen.)

Stade Am Deich, Ettelbruck
Referee: Vladimir Vnuk (Slovakia)

5 June 2012
18:30

Austria	4–1	Luxembourg
Holzhauser 16' (pen.); Kainz 68'; Drazan 87'; Alar 90+1'	Report	Turpel 89'

Franz Fekete Stadium, Kapfenberg
Referee: Nikola Dabanović (Montenegro)
5 June 2012
19:00

Netherlands	5–0	Bulgaria
Fer 34' (pen.); Wijnaldum 66' van Ginkel 81'; Zeefuik 85'; Bacuna 90+3' (pen.)	Report

De Geusselt, Maastricht
Referee: Raymond Crangle (Northern Ireland)

6 September 2012
20:45

Scotland	3–0	Luxembourg
Armstrong 63'; Griffiths 68'; Watt 83' (pen.)	Report

St Mirren Park, Paisley
Referee: Thorvaldur Árnason (Iceland)
7 September 2012
18:00

Netherlands	4–1	Austria
Nuytinck 8'; Zeefuik 28'; Wijnaldum 38' ten Voorde 66'	Report	Sabitzer 56'

Koning Willem II Stadion, Tilburg
Referee: Nikolaj Hänni (Switzerland)

10 September 2012
18:30

Austria	3–2	Scotland
Gregoritsch 8'; Weimann 76'; Holzhauser 90+1'	Report	Watt 54'; Russell 75'

Stadion Schnabelholz, Altach
Referee: Mattias Gestranius (Finland)
10 September 2012
18:30

Luxembourg	1–3	Bulgaria
Almeida 2'	Report	Chochev 12'; Kirilov 48', 69'

Stade Am Deich, Ettelbruck
Referee: Michael Tykgaard (Denmark)

== Goalscorers ==
8 goals

- (Netherlands) Género Zeefuik
- (Scotland) Jordan Rhodes

4 goals

- (Austria) Andreas Weimann

3 goals

- (Austria) Deni Alar
- (Austria) Raphael Holzhauser
- (Netherlands) Leroy Fer

2 goals

- (Bulgaria) Radoslav Kirilov
- (Bulgaria) Georgi Milanov
- (Bulgaria) Momchil Tsvetanov
- (Luxembourg) Goncalo Almeida
- (Netherlands) Georginio Wijnaldum
- (Scotland) Tony Watt

1 goal

- (Austria) Christopher Dibon
- (Austria) Christopher Drazan
- (Austria) Michael Gregoritsch
- (Austria) Tobias Kainz
- (Austria) Marcel Sabitzer
- (Bulgaria) Rosen Kolev
- (Bulgaria) Georgi Kostadinov
- (Bulgaria) Tomislav Kostadinov
- (Bulgaria) Aleksandar Tonev
- (Luxembourg) Laurent Jans
- (Luxembourg) Massimo Martino
- (Luxembourg) Chris Philipps
- (Luxembourg) David Turpel
- (Netherlands) Leandro Bacuna
- (Netherlands) Nacer Barazite
- (Netherlands) Jordy Clasie
- (Netherlands) Adam Maher
- (Netherlands) Bram Nuytinck
- (Netherlands) Rick ten Voorde
- (Netherlands) Marco van Ginkel
- (Netherlands) Ricky van Haaren
- (Scotland) Stuart Armstrong
- (Scotland) Leigh Griffiths
- (Scotland) Paul Hanlon
- (Scotland) Alex MacDonald
- (Scotland) Johnny Russell
- (Scotland) David Wotherspoon
