= 2013 UEFA European Under-21 Championship qualification Group 8 =

Football tournament qualification stage

The teams competing in Group 8 of the 2013 UEFA European Under-21 Championship qualifying competition were Azerbaijan, Belgium, England, Iceland, and Norway.

== Standings ==
| Pos | Team | Pld | W | D | L | GF | GA | GD | Pts | Qualification | (England) | (Norway) | (Belgium) | (Azerbaijan) | (Iceland) |
|---|---|---|---|---|---|---|---|---|---|---|---|---|---|---|---|
| 1 | England | 8 | 7 | 0 | 1 | 24 | 3 | +21 | 21 | Play-offs | — | 1–0 | 4–0 | 6–0 | 5–0 |
| 2 | Norway | 8 | 5 | 1 | 2 | 13 | 7 | +6 | 16 | Play-offs | 1–2 | — | 2–2 | 1–0 | 2–1 |
| 3 | Belgium | 8 | 3 | 2 | 3 | 17 | 15 | +2 | 11 | | 2–1 | 1–3 | — | 4–1 | 5–0 |
| 4 | Azerbaijan | 8 | 2 | 1 | 5 | 6 | 18 | −12 | 7 | | 0–2 | 0–2 | 2–2 | — | 1–0 |
| 5 | Iceland | 8 | 1 | 0 | 7 | 4 | 21 | −17 | 3 | | 0–3 | 0–2 | 2–1 | 1–2 | — |

== Results and fixtures ==
1 September 2011
19:00

| Iceland | 2–1 | Belgium |
|---|---|---|
| Sigurðarson 25', 87' | Report | Benteke 42' |

Hlíðarendi, Reykjavík
Referee: Miroslav Zelinka (Czech Republic)
1 September 2011
20:30

| England | 6–0 | Azerbaijan |
|---|---|---|
| Dawson 5', 89'; Lansbury 21', 73'; Henderson 45'; Waghorn 79' | Report |

Vicarage Road, Watford
Attendance: 7,738
Referee: Domagoj Vučkov (Croatia)

6 September 2011
18:00

| Belgium | 4–1 | Azerbaijan |
|---|---|---|
| Bruno 2'; Mertens 35'; Meunier 81'; Benteke 83' | Report | Imamverdiyev 24' |

Olympisch Stadion, Antwerp
Referee: Ivan Kružliak (Slovakia)
6 September 2011
18:15

| Iceland | 0–2 | Norway |
|---|---|---|
| | Report | King 31'; Rogne 87' |

Kópavogsvöllur, Kópavogur
Referee: Jakob Kehlet (Denmark)

6 October 2011
15:00

| Azerbaijan | 0–2 | Norway |
|---|---|---|
| | Report | Henriksen 21'; Børven 90+2' |

Dalga Arena, Baku
Referee: Arnold Hunter (Northern Ireland)
6 October 2011
20:45

| Iceland | 0–3 | England |
|---|---|---|
| | Report | Oxlade-Chamberlain 12', 15', 49' |

Laugardalsvöllur, Reykjavík
Attendance: 1,500
Referee: Clément Turpin (France)

10 October 2011
15:00

| Azerbaijan | 2–2 | Belgium |
|---|---|---|
| Imamverdiyev 22'; Özkara 31' | Report | De Pauw 40'; De Jonghe 76' |

Dalga Arena, Baku
Referee: Marius Avram (Romania)
10 October 2011
19:00

| Norway | 1–2 | England |
|---|---|---|
| Berisha 24' | Report | Dawson 3'; Henderson 7' |

Marienlyst Stadion, Drammen
Attendance: 3,223
Referee: Halis Özkahya (Turkey)

10 November 2011
19:00

| Norway | 2–2 | Belgium |
|---|---|---|
| Pedersen 57'; De Lanlay 70' | Report | Bruno 2'; Badibanga 60' |

Viking Stadion, Stavanger
Referee: Ilias Spathas (Greece)
10 November 2011
20:30

| England | 5–0 | Iceland |
|---|---|---|
| Sordell 40'; Kelly 58'; Dawson 86'; Gardner 90', 90+2' | Report |

Colchester Community Stadium, Colchester
Attendance: 10,051
Referee: Pavle Radovanović (Montenegro)

14 November 2011
20:45

| Belgium | 2–1 | England |
|---|---|---|
| Naessens 72'; El Kaddouri 90+1' | Report | Kelly 14' |

Stade Charles Tondreau, Mons
Attendance: 3,000
Referee: Harald Lechner (Austria)

29 February 2012
15:00

| Azerbaijan | 1–0 | Iceland |
|---|---|---|
| Gökdemir 41' | Report |

Dalga Arena, Baku
Referee: Emir Alečković (Bosnia and Herzegovina)
29 February 2012
19:00

| England | 4–0 | Belgium |
|---|---|---|
| Lansbury 9', 53'; Caulker 36'; Oxlade-Chamberlain 90+4' (pen.) | Report |

Riverside Stadium, Middlesbrough
Attendance: 22,647
Referee: Liran Liany (Israel)

1 June 2012
18:00

| Norway | 1–0 | Azerbaijan |
|---|---|---|
| Pedersen 29' | Report |

Marienlyst Stadion, Drammen
Referee: Dimitar Meckarovski (Macedonia)

5 June 2012
21:15

| Iceland | 1–2 | Azerbaijan |
|---|---|---|
| Sigurðarson 20' | Report | Abdullayev 77'; Imamverdiyev 90+1' |

KR-völlur, Reykjavík
Referee: Petur Reinert (Faroe Islands)

12 June 2012
18:00

| Norway | 2–1 | Iceland |
|---|---|---|
| Eikrem 15'; Våge Nilsen 86' | Report | Sigurjónsson 26' |

Marienlyst Stadion, Drammen
Referee: Ievgenii Aranovskyi (Ukraine)

6 September 2012
17:00

| Azerbaijan | 0–2 | England |
|---|---|---|
| | Report | Caulker 28'; Shelvey 83' |

Dalga Arena, Baku
Attendance: 214
Referee: Athanassios Giachos (Greece)
6 September 2012
19:30

| Belgium | 1–3 | Norway |
|---|---|---|
| Batshuayi 70' | Report | Singh 12' (pen.); Berget 60'; Bakenga 90+2' |

Freethiel Stadion, Beveren
Referee: Vitali Meshkov (Russia)

10 September 2012
20:00

| England | 1–0 | Norway |
|---|---|---|
| Wickham 43' | Report |

Proact Stadium, Chesterfield
Attendance: 9,947
Referee: Slavko Vinčić (Slovenia)
10 September 2012
20:00

| Belgium | 5–0 | Iceland |
|---|---|---|
| Vetokele 25', 89'; Van Tricht 69'; Batshuayi 74', 90+4' | Report |

Freethiel Stadion, Beveren
Referee: Padraig Sutton (Republic of Ireland)

== Goalscorers ==
4 goals

- (England) Craig Dawson
- (England) Henri Lansbury
- (England) Alex Oxlade-Chamberlain

3 goals

- (Azerbaijan) Javid Imamverdiyev
- (Belgium) Michy Batshuayi
- (Iceland) Björn Bergmann Sigurðarson

2 goals

- (Belgium) Christian Benteke
- (Belgium) Gianni Bruno
- (Belgium) Igor Vetokele
- (England) Steven Caulker
- (England) Gary Gardner
- (England) Jordan Henderson
- (England) Martin Kelly
- (Norway) Marcus Pedersen

1 goal

- (Azerbaijan) Araz Abdullayev
- (Azerbaijan) Ali Gökdemir
- (Azerbaijan) Cihan Özkara
- (Belgium) Ziguy Badibanga
- (Belgium) Jimmy de Jonghe
- (Belgium) Nill De Pauw
- (Belgium) Omar El Kaddouri
- (Belgium) Gregory Mertens
- (Belgium) Thomas Meunier
- (Belgium) Jens Naessens
- (Belgium) Wannes Van Tricht
- (England) Jonjo Shelvey
- (England) Marvin Sordell
- (England) Martyn Waghorn
- (England) Connor Wickham
- (Iceland) Rúnar Már Sigurjónsson
- (Norway) Mushaga Bakenga
- (Norway) Jo Inge Berget
- (Norway) Valon Berisha
- (Norway) Torgeir Børven
- (Norway) Magnus Eikrem
- (Norway) Markus Henriksen
- (Norway) Yann-Erik de Lanlay
- (Norway) Joshua King
- (Norway) Thomas Rogne
- (Norway) Harmeet Singh
- (Norway) Joakim Våge Nilsen
