= 2013 UEFA European Under-21 Championship qualification Group 6 =

Football tournament qualification stage

The teams competing in Group 6 of the 2013 UEFA European Under-21 Championship qualifying competition were Albania, Moldova, Poland, Portugal, and Russia.

== Standings ==
Pos	Team	Pld	W	D	L	GF	GA	GD	Pts	Qualification	(Russia)	(Portugal)	(Poland)	(Moldova)	(Albania)
1	Russia	8	5	2	1	17	5	+12	17	Play-offs	—	2–1	4–1	2–2	0–0
2	Portugal	8	4	3	1	15	6	+9	15		1–0	—	1–1	5–0	3–1
3	Poland	8	3	2	3	13	13	0	11		0–2	0–0	—	0–1	4–3
4	Moldova	8	2	1	5	10	24	−14	7		0–6	0–2	2–4	—	2–1
5	Albania	8	1	2	5	11	18	−7	5		0–1	2–2	0–3	4–3	—

== Results and fixtures ==
1 September 2011
18:00

Moldova	0–2	Portugal
	Report	Pereira 55'; Fonte 90'

Malaya Sportivnaya Arena, Tiraspol
Referee: Slavko Vinčić (Slovenia)
2 September 2011
17:00

Albania	0–3	Poland
	Report	Teodorczyk 51', 80'; Borysiuk 90+2'

Skënderbeu Stadium, Korçë
Referee: Martin Strömbergsson (Sweden)

6 September 2011
18:00

Albania	4–3	Moldova
Sadiku 59', 80'; Brahimi 75'; Telushi 79'	Report	Ioniţă 54', 61' (pen.); Ginsari 89'

Skënderbeu Stadium, Korçë
Referee: Bobby Madden (Scotland)
6 September 2011
18:00

Poland	0–2	Russia
	Report	Kokorin 13'; Cheryshev 70'

Kielce City Stadium, Kielce
Referee: Marius Avram (Romania)

6 October 2011
22:00

Portugal	1–1	Poland
Mendes 9'	Report	Kucharczyk 36'

Estádio Municipal de Rio Maior, Rio Maior
Referee: Olivier Thual (France)
7 October 2011
15:00

Moldova	0–6	Russia
	Report	Kokorin 20', 28', 78'; Sosnin 33'; Shatov 56', 88'

Malaya Sportivnaya Arena, Tiraspol
Referee: Martin Strömbergsson (Sweden)

11 October 2011
15:30

Poland	4–3	Albania
Krychowiak 34' (pen.); Klich 54'; Sobiech 64'; Woźniak 90+2'	Report	Sadiku 55', 90'; Bala 81'

Bronisław Malinowski Stadium, Grudziądz
Referee: Padraig Sutton (Republic of Ireland)
11 October 2011
17:00

Russia	2–1	Portugal
Kokorin 51'; Smolov 54'	Report	Eduardo 30'

Arena Khimki, Khimki
Referee: Stuart Attwell (England)

10 November 2011
16:00

Albania	0–1	Russia
	Report	Smolov 74' (pen.)

Niko Dovana Stadium, Durrës
Referee: Mattias Gestranius (Finland)
10 November 2011
22:00

Portugal	5–0	Moldova
Oliveira 6', 29'; Fonte 23'; Saná 25'; Camará 70'	Report

Estádio Municipal de Rio Maior, Rio Maior
Referee: Alan Mario Sant (Malta)

14 November 2011
18:00

Poland	0–1	Moldova
	Report	Andronic 71'

Stadion Amica, Wronki
Referee: Jovan Kaluđerović (Montenegro)
14 November 2011
19:00

Albania	2–2	Portugal
Sadiku 55', 77'	Report	Josué 20'; Eduardo 62'

Niko Dovana Stadium, Durrës
Referee: Ivan Kružliak (Slovakia)

1 June 2012
19:00

Moldova	2–4	Poland
Gînsari 54'; Haceaturov 60' (pen.)	Report	Krychowiak 3', 15' (pen.); Kupisz 33'; Klich 68'

Malaya Sportivnaya Arena, Tiraspol
Referee: Sandor Szabo (Hungary)
1 June 2012
22:00

Portugal	1–0	Russia
Martins 74'	Report

Estádio Cidade de Barcelos, Barcelos
Referee: Paolo Mazzoleni (Italy)

6 June 2012
22:00

Portugal	3–1	Albania
Agra 2'; Fonte 8', 54'	Report	Bala 14'

Municipal, Marinha Grande
Referee: Stavros Tritsonis (Greece)

12 June 2012
15:30

Russia	0–0	Albania
	Report

Arena Khimki, Khimki
Referee: Ioannis Anastasiou (Cyprus)

6 September 2012
16:00

Russia	4–1	Poland
Bibilov 22'; Cheryshev 74', 90+3'; Smolov 88'	Report	Sobiech 7'

Central Stadium, Yekaterinburg
Referee: Halis Özkahya (Turkey)
6 September 2012
18:00

Moldova	2–1	Albania
Haceaturov 8'; Leuca 87'	Report	Prençi 90+2'

Malaya Sportivnaya Arena, Tiraspol
Referee: Chris Reisch (Luxembourg)

10 September 2012
17:30

Russia	2–2	Moldova
Grigoryev 74'; Smolov 81'	Report	Cheptine 43'; Jardan 90+2'

Central Stadium, Yekaterinburg
Referee: Damir Batinić (Croatia)
10 September 2012
17:30

Poland	0–0	Portugal
	Report

Stadion GOSiR, Gdynia
Referee: Michael Oliver (England)

== Goalscorers ==
6 goals

- (Albania) Armando Sadiku

5 goals

- (Russia) Aleksandr Kokorin

4 goals

- (Portugal) Rui Fonte
- (Russia) Fyodor Smolov

3 goals

- (Poland) Grzegorz Krychowiak
- (Russia) Denis Cheryshev

2 goals

- (Albania) Bekim Bala
- (Moldova) Artyom Khachaturov
- (Moldova) Artur Ioniţă
- (Moldova) Radu Gînsari
- (Poland) Łukasz Teodorczyk
- (Poland) Mateusz Klich
- (Poland) Artur Sobiech
- (Portugal) Wilson Eduardo
- (Portugal) Nélson Oliveira
- (Russia) Oleg Shatov

1 goal

- (Albania) Mërgim Brahimi
- (Albania) Elvis Prençi
- (Albania) Bruno Telushi
- (Moldova) Gheorghe Andronic
- (Moldova) Anatolii Cheptine
- (Moldova) Ion Jardan
- (Moldova) Petru Leuca
- (Poland) Ariel Borysiuk
- (Poland) Tomasz Kupisz
- (Poland) Michał Kucharczyk
- (Poland) Arkadiusz Woźniak
- (Portugal) Salvador Agra
- (Portugal) Abel Camará
- (Portugal) André Martins
- (Portugal) Pedro Filipe Mendes
- (Portugal) João Duarte Pereira
- (Portugal) Josué Pesqueira
- (Portugal) Saná
- (Russia) Shota Bibilov
- (Russia) Maksim Grigoryev
- (Russia) Anton Sosnin
