= Fabian Schär =

Swiss footballer (born 1991)

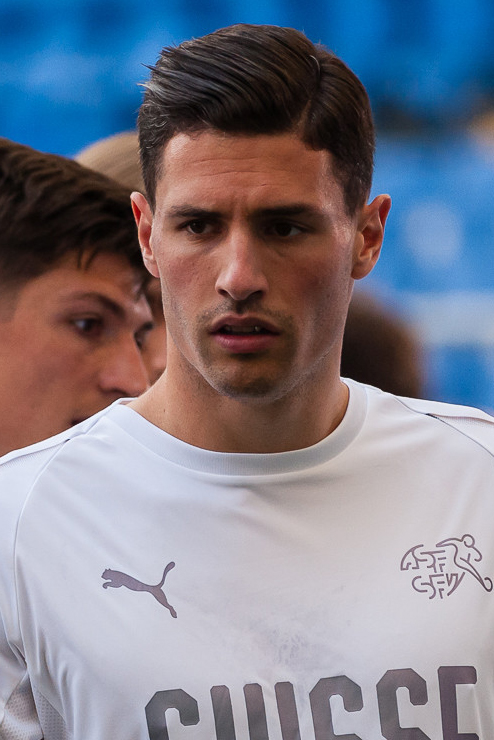
- Schär training with Switzerland at the 2018 FIFA World Cup

Personal information
- Full name: Fabian Lukas Schär
- Date of birth: 20 December 1991 (age 34)
- Place of birth: Wil, Switzerland
- Height: 1.86 m (6 ft 1 in)
- Position: Centre-back

Team information
- Current team: Newcastle United
- Number: 5

Youth career
- 1999–2009: FC Wil

Senior career*
Years	Team	Apps	(Gls)
2009–2012	FC Wil	52	(9)
2012–2015	Basel	73	(9)
2015–2017	TSG Hoffenheim	30	(1)
2017–2018	Deportivo A Coruña	25	(2)
2018–	Newcastle United	211	(18)

International career
2010–2011	Switzerland U20	3	(0)
2012	Switzerland U21	5	(1)
2012	Switzerland Olympic	2	(0)
2013–2024	Switzerland	86	(8)
- * Club domestic league appearances and goals as of 23:10, 7 January 2026 (UTC)

Fabian Lukas Schär (Swiss Standard German: [faˈbi̯aːn ˈʃɛːr]; born 20 December 1991) is a Swiss professional footballer who plays as a centre-back for Premier League club Newcastle United. He is known for his powerful free kicks, long shots and long passes.

Beginning his career at his hometown club of Wil, Schär transferred to Basel in 2012, winning the Swiss Super League in all three of his seasons there before his move to TSG Hoffenheim. He then joined Deportivo La Coruña, and joined English side Newcastle United in 2018.

After playing at the 2012 Olympics, Schär made his senior debut for Switzerland in 2013. He represented the nation at the FIFA World Cup in 2014, 2018 and 2022, as well as the UEFA European Championship in 2016, 2020 and 2024.

== Club career ==
=== Wil ===
Born in Wil, in the Canton of St. Gallen, Schär began his playing career at hometown club Wil and rose through the youth ranks, soon playing regularly for Wil's reserve team. He eventually made his league debut on 29 November 2009, against FC Stade Nyonnais, coming on as a late substitute. He scored his first Swiss Challenge League goal in an away win against Yverdon-Sport on 30 October 2010.

=== Basel ===
On 4 July 2012, Schär transferred to Basel on a three-year contract with the option of a fourth. He made his Swiss Super League debut on 29 September in a 1–1 away draw against Lausanne-Sport. He scored his first goal for his new club on 7 October in the St. Jakob-Park during the 3–2 home win against Servette, heading an equaliser following a corner from Fabian Frei.

At the end of the Swiss Super League season 2012–13 Schär won the Championship title and was Swiss Cup runner up with Basel. In the 2012–13 UEFA Europa League, Basel advanced as far as the semi-finals, there being matched against the reigning UEFA Champions League holders Chelsea, but they were knocked out losing both matches and being beaten 2–5 on aggregate.

At the end of the 2013–14 Super League season Schär won his second league championship with Basel. They also reached the final of the 2013–14 Swiss Cup, but were beaten 2–0 by Zürich after extra time. During the 2013–14 Champions League season Basel reached the group stage and finished the group in third position. Thus they qualified for Europa League knockout phase and here they advanced as far as the quarter-finals.

The 2014–15 season was a very successful one for Basel and Schär. Basel won the championship for the sixth time in a row that season. In the 2014–15 Swiss Cup they reached the final, but for the third season in a row, they finished as runners-up, losing 0–3 to Sion in the final. Basel entered the Champions League in the group stage and reached the knockout stages, with a 1–1 away draw against Liverpool enough to take them through. Basel later lost to Porto in the Round of 16.

=== Hoffenheim ===
On 4 June 2015, Schär signed for Hoffenheim. On 16 April 2016, he scored his only goal at the club from a header in a 2–1 victory over Hertha BSC.

=== Deportivo La Coruña ===
On 21 July 2017, Schär signed a four-year deal with Deportivo de La Coruña. He made his La Liga debut on 20 August, starting in a 3–0 home loss against Real Madrid. He scored two goals in the 2017–18 season, which ended in relegation for the Galician team.

=== Newcastle United ===
On 26 July 2018, following Deportivo de La Coruña's relegation from La Liga, Schär signed a three-year deal with Newcastle United after the club had activated his £3 million buy out clause in his contract.

He made his debut for the club on 26 August 2018, in a 2–1 defeat to Chelsea. Schär scored his first goals for Newcastle against Cardiff City on 19 January 2019, netting twice in a 3–0 victory at St James' Park. He scored his third Newcastle goal against Burnley in a 2–0 win, opening the scoring with a 30-yard strike that would win Premier League and Match of the Day's February Goal of the Month competition. His fourth goal came in the final game of the season, and eventual 4–0 win over Fulham.

On 4 October 2023, Schär scored his first Champions League goal for Newcastle United against Paris Saint-Germain in a 4–1 home victory during the 2023–24 season group stage.

On 8 January 2024, Schär extended his contract with Newcastle until the summer of 2025. On 13 April, Schär netted his 50th career goal during United's 4–0 victory over Tottenham Hotspur.

On 16 March 2025, Schär played the full 90 minutes for Newcastle in their victory in the 2025 EFL Cup final, making him part of the first Newcastle side to win a domestic trophy in 70 years. Schär scored the side's only goal in their 1–0 victory over AFC Wimbledon in the third round and the third in a 3–1 victory over Brentford in the quarter-final on the road to the final.

On 2 June 2026, the club announced Schär had signed a one-year contract extension until the end of the 2026–27 season.

== International career ==
=== Youth ===
Schär was a Switzerland youth international having played at under-20 and under-21 level. Schär made his international debut for the Swiss U-20 team in a game against Poland U-20 on 17 November 2011. He played his first game for the Swiss U-21 on 29 February 2012, in the 2–1 defeat against the Austrian U-21. He scored his first goal for the Swiss U-21 during his fourth appearance for them on 10 September 2012, in a match against Estonia U-21 This was the final game in the qualification to the 2013 UEFA European Under-21 Football Championship. Switzerland finished in second position and entered the play-offs. In the first leg of the qualification play-offs on 12 October 2012, against the German U-21 team Schär was shown the red card after he fouled Sebastian Polter as last man. Despite the goal from the penalty spot the game ended in a 1–1 draw.

He was selected to represent Switzerland in the men's football tournament at the 2012 Summer Olympics as part of the Swiss under-23 team. He played over 90 minutes in the first two games of the tournament, but the team were knocked out, finishing in fourth position of their Group.

=== Senior ===
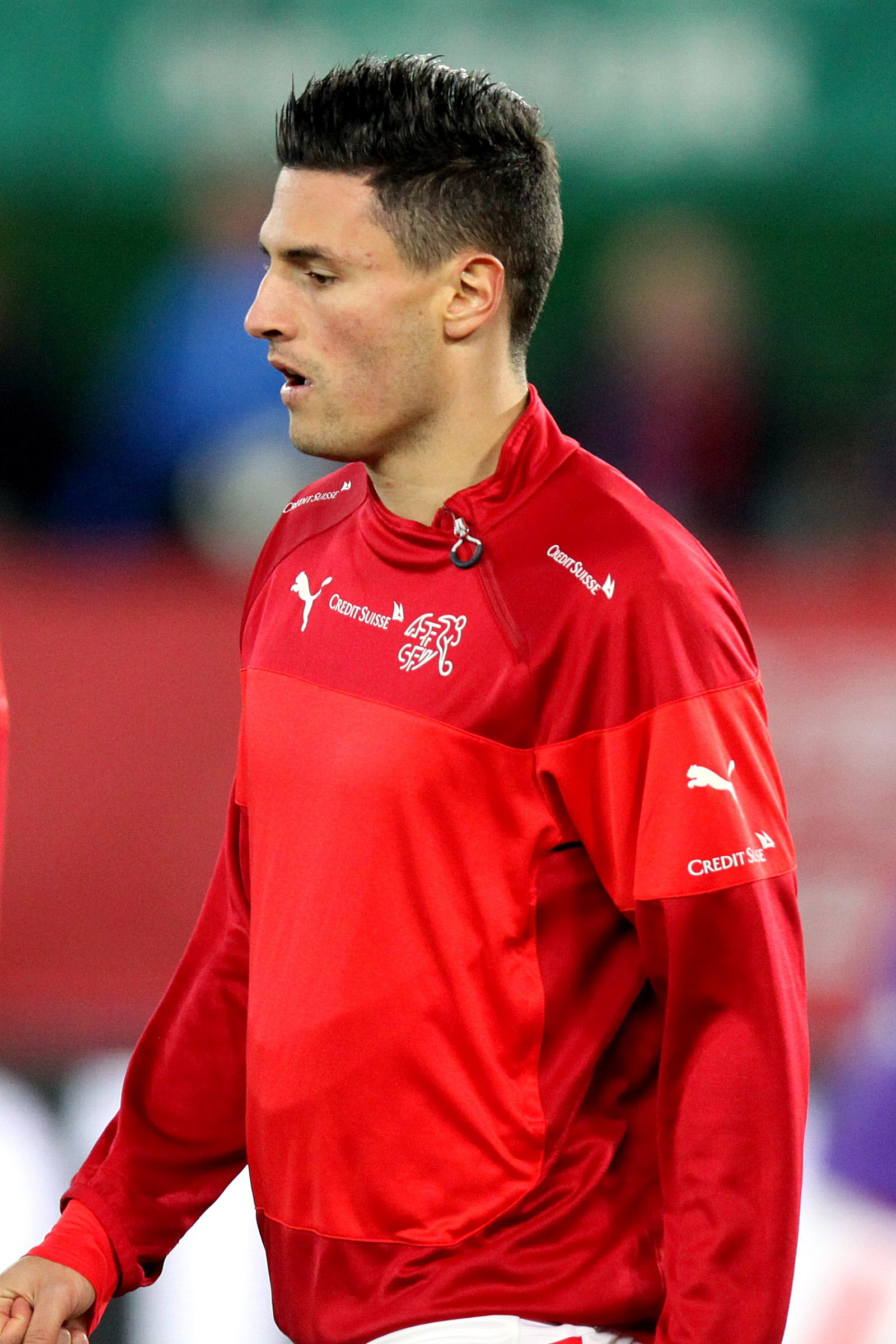
Schär with Switzerland in 2015

On 8 August 2013, Schär was called up to the Swiss senior team for the first time and made his debut as a half-time substitute for Philippe Senderos in a friendly match against Brazil at Basel's St. Jakob-Park on 14 August 2013.

On 6 September 2013, Schär made both his first competitive appearance and full debut for Switzerland in a 2014 FIFA World Cup qualifier against Iceland. He scored in the 27th minute to give the Nati a 2–1 lead in a match that ended in a 4–4 draw. Four days later, on 10 September, Schär scored both goals in a 2–0 away win over Norway. He started a third consecutive match in the away qualifier against Albania on 11 October, as the Swiss won 2–1 to ensure qualification for the tournament finals in Brazil.

On 13 May 2014, Schär was named in Switzerland's squad for the 2014 FIFA World Cup. He made his tournament debut as a starter in the team's third match, replacing the injured Steve von Bergen and helping Switzerland to a clean sheet in a 3–0 defeat of Honduras. He played the full 120 minutes of Switzerland's round of 16 fixture against Argentina as the Nati defence was able to keep the match goalless until the 28th minute of extra time, when Ángel Di María scored the only goal.

During UEFA Euro 2016 qualifying, Schär scored twice and provided four assists as the team finished second in Group E to reach the tournament finals in France. In the team's first game of UEFA Euro 2016, he scored the only goal of a 1–0 win against Albania in Lens. He was an ever-present in central defence for the Swiss during the tournament, helping to shut out host nation France in the final Group A match, earning the team a 0–0 draw which qualified them for the knockout stage. In the round of 16 match against Poland, Schär played the full 120 minutes and was one of four Swiss players to score in the penalty shootout. However, Granit Xhaka's miss resulted in the team losing 5–4 and being eliminated from the tournament.

He was included in the 23-man squad for the 2018 FIFA World Cup and played in all three Group E matches as the Swiss reached the knockout stage with an unbeaten record against Brazil, Serbia and Costa Rica. Due to receiving two yellow cards in the group stage, Schär was suspended for the round of 16 match against Sweden, which the Nati lost 1–0.

In June 2019, he played in both the semi-final against Portugal and the third-place play-off against England of the 2019 UEFA Nations League Finals. In the latter match, he scored the team's fifth kick of the penalty shootout, in an eventual 6–5 loss.

In 2021, Schär was a member of the Switzerland squad for UEFA Euro 2020. He started and played the full 90 minutes of the opening match against Wales, before playing the opening 58 minutes of the 3–0 loss to Italy in the second match. He appeared as a substitute against both France in the round of 16 and Spain in the quarter-final. Both matches were decided on penalty shootouts, with Schär scoring against France but having his shot saved by Unai Simón against Spain as the Nati were eliminated with a 4–2 shootout loss.

In November 2022, he was selected in the Switzerland squad for the 2022 FIFA World Cup in Qatar. After being an unused substitute in the team's first two Group G matches, Schär replaced the ill Nico Elvedi for the third match against Serbia, which Switzerland won 3–2 to qualify for the knockout stage. He retained his place in the team for the round of 16 match, which Switzerland lost 6–1 to Portugal.

On 7 June 2024, Schär was named in Switzerland's squad for UEFA Euro 2024. He played the full match in the team's opening Group A fixture on 15 June, as the Nati defeated Hungary 3–1 in Cologne.

On 26 August 2024, Schär announced his retirement from international football.

== Personal life ==
Schär has a girlfriend, Alexandra Munger. In 2023 he completed a degree in Sports Management.

== Career statistics ==
=== Club ===
As of match played 7 January 2026

Appearances and goals by club, season and competition
Club	Season	League			National cup (Note: Includes Swiss Cup, DFB-Pokal, Copa del Rey, FA Cup)		League cup (Note: Includes EFL Cup)		Europe		Total	
Club	Season	Division	Apps	Goals	Apps	Goals	Apps	Goals	Apps	Goals	Apps	Goals
FC Wil	2009–10	Swiss Challenge League	2	0	0	0	—		—		2	0
FC Wil	2010–11	Swiss Challenge League	24	4	1	0	—		—		25	4
FC Wil	2011–12	Swiss Challenge League	26	5	3	0	—		—		29	5
FC Wil	Total		52	9	4	0	—		—		56	9
Basel	2012–13	Swiss Super League	21	4	3	0	—		14 (Note: One appearance in UEFA Champions League, thirteen appearances and four goals in UEFA Europa League)	4	38	8
Basel	2013–14	Swiss Super League	22	4	1	0	—		12 (Note: Ten appearances and two goals in UEFA Champions League, two appearances in UEFA Europa League)	2	35	6
Basel	2014–15	Swiss Super League	30	1	4	0	—		7 (Note: Appearances in UEFA Champions League)	0	41	1
Basel	Total		73	9	8	0	—		33	6	114	15
TSG Hoffenheim	2015–16	Bundesliga	24	1	1	0	—		—		25	1
TSG Hoffenheim	2016–17	Bundesliga	6	0	1	0	—		—		7	0
TSG Hoffenheim	Total		30	1	2	0	—		—		32	1
Deportivo La Coruña	2017–18	La Liga	25	2	2	0	—		—		27	2
Newcastle United	2018–19	Premier League	24	4	3	0	1	0	—		28	4
Newcastle United	2019–20	Premier League	22	2	4	0	1	0	—		27	2
Newcastle United	2020–21	Premier League	18	1	0	0	1	0	—		19	1
Newcastle United	2021–22	Premier League	25	2	1	0	0	0	—		26	2
Newcastle United	2022–23	Premier League	36	1	0	0	5	0	—		41	1
Newcastle United	2023–24	Premier League	36	4	4	0	1	0	6	1	47	5
Newcastle United	2024–25	Premier League	34	4	3	0	5	2	—		42	6
Newcastle United	2025–26	Premier League	16	0	0	0	2	1	3	0	21	1
Newcastle United	Total		211	18	15	0	16	3	9	1	251	22
Career total			391	39	31	0	16	3	42	7	480	49

=== International ===
Appearances and goals by national team and year
National team	Year	Apps	Goals
Switzerland	2013	5	3
Switzerland	2014	5	1
Switzerland	2015	7	1
Switzerland	2016	11	2
Switzerland	2017	7	0
Switzerland	2018	12	0
Switzerland	2019	7	1
Switzerland	2020	4	0
Switzerland	2021	11	0
Switzerland	2022	6	0
Switzerland	2023	3	0
Switzerland	2024	8	0
Total		86	8

Switzerland score listed first, score column indicates score after each Schär goal.

International goals by date, venue, cap, opponent, score, result and competition
No.	Date	Venue	Cap	Opponent	Score	Result	Competition
1	6 September 2013	Stade de Suisse, Bern, Switzerland	2	Iceland	2–1	4–4	2014 FIFA World Cup qualification
2	10 September 2013	Ullevaal Stadion, Oslo, Norway	3	Norway	1–0	2–0	2014 FIFA World Cup qualification
3	10 September 2013	Ullevaal Stadion, Oslo, Norway	3	Norway	2–0	2–0	2014 FIFA World Cup qualification
4	15 November 2014	AFG Arena, St. Gallen, Switzerland	9	Lithuania	2–0	4–0	UEFA Euro 2016 qualification
5	27 March 2015	Swissporarena, Lucerne, Switzerland	11	Estonia	1–0	3–0	UEFA Euro 2016 qualification
6	11 June 2016	Stade Bollaert-Delelis, Lens, France	21	Albania	1–0	1–0	UEFA Euro 2016
7	10 October 2016	Estadi Nacional, Andorra la Vella, Andorra	27	Andorra	1–0	2–1	2018 FIFA World Cup qualification
8	5 September 2019	Aviva Stadium, Dublin, Ireland	51	Republic of Ireland	1–0	1–1	UEFA Euro 2020 qualification

== Honours ==
Basel

- Swiss Super League: 2012–13, 2013–14, 2014–15

Newcastle United

- EFL Cup: 2024–25; runner-up: 2022–23

Individual

- Swiss Super League Team of the Year: 2013–14, 2014–15
- Premier League Goal of the Month: February 2019
- North East FWA Player of the Year: 2019
