= Arnold Šimonek =

Slovak footballer

Personal information
- Full name: Arnold Šimonek
- Date of birth: 19 September 1990 (age 36)
- Place of birth: Nové Zámky, Czechoslovakia
- Height: 1.92 m (6 ft 3 1/2 in)
- Position: Centre forward

Team information
- Current team: ŠK Tvrdošovce
- Number: 19

Youth career
- 1996–1999: Dubník
- 1999–2004: Nové Zámky
- 2004–2008: Nitra

Senior career*
Years	Team	Apps	(Gls)
2007–2012	Nitra	82	(6)
2010	→ Vysočina Jihlava (loan)	19	(3)
2013–2014	Vysočina Jihlava	18	(3)
2013–2014	→ Manisaspor (loan)	15	(2)
2014	Myjava	6	(0)
2015	Veľký Lapáš	28	(21)
2016	Poprad	2	(1)
2016–2017	Veľký Lapáš		
2017–2018	ŠK Tvrdošovce		
2019–	ŠK Tvrdošovce		

International career
- Slovakia U-17
2008–2009	Slovakia U-19	4	(0)
2011–2012	Slovakia U-21	13	(5)
- * Club domestic league appearances and goals as of 11 February 2016

Arnold Šimonek (born 19 September 1990) is a Slovak football striker who plays for OFK 1948 Veľký Lapáš.

== International career ==
Šimonek represented Slovakia at youth international level, including the under-21 team. He took part in the 2013 UEFA European Under-21 Championship qualification, in which Slovakia finished second in Group 9 with 15 points, behind France with 21 points. He scored in a 1–0 away win against Kazakhstan on 6 September 2011, and in a 6–0 away win against Latvia on 11 October 2011. Slovakia failed to qualify for the final tournament after losing 2–0 both at home and away to the Netherlands in the play-offs.
