= Adam Žilák =

Slovak footballer (born 1991)

Personal information
- Full name: Adam Žilák
- Date of birth: 7 December 1991 (age 34)
- Place of birth: Martin, Czech and Slovak FR
- Height: 1.84 m (6 ft 0 in)
- Position: Winger

Team information
- Current team: Tatran Oravské Veselé
- Number: 13

Youth career
- Žilina

Senior career*
Years	Team	Apps	(Gls)
2009–2015	Žilina	16	(0)
2011–2012	→ Zlaté Moravce (loan)	25	(2)
2015	Podbrezová	7	(0)
2015–2016	Borčice	7	(0)
2016	MŠK Fomat Martin	7	(0)
2017–2020	Tatran Oravské Veselé	23	(3)

International career
2009–2010	Slovakia U19	6	(0)
2011–2012	Slovakia U21	7	(2)
- * Club domestic league appearances and goals

Adam Žilák (born 7 December 1991) is a Slovak politician and former footballer.

== Football career ==
On 16 July 2009, Žilák made his first team debut against Dacia Chişinău at the 2009–10 UEFA Europa League at age 17. He played for his national under-21 team in the 2013 UEFA European Under-21 Championship qualification Group 9, scoring against France in a 2–1 win on 7 September 2012.

He played in the 3. Liga for TJ Tatran Oravské Veselé towards the end of his footballing career.

== Political career ==
Žilák first ran for elected office in 2018. He became the deputy mayor of Martin in January 2023.

== Honours ==
Žilina

Slovak First Football League Winners: 2009-10

Slovak Super Cup: 2010-11
