= Ermin Alić =

Montenegrin footballer

Personal information
- Full name: Ermin Alić
- Date of birth: 23 February 1992 (age 34)
- Place of birth: Bijelo Polje, SFR Yugoslavia
- Height: 1.89 m (6 ft 2 1/2 in)
- Position: Centre-back

Team information
- Current team: FK Podgorica

Senior career*
Years	Team	Apps	(Gls)
2010–2011	Jedinstvo Bijelo Polje	2	(0)
2011–2013	Rudar Pljevlja	50	(1)
2013–2015	Villarreal B	22	(0)
2015	Spartak Subotica	1	(0)
2016–2017	Rudar Pljevlja	41	(0)
2018	Dečić	7	(0)
2018–2019	Triglav Kranj	14	(0)
2019	Olimpija Ljubljana	0	(0)
2020	OFK Titograd	25	(1)
2022	Drava Ptuj	6	(0)
2022–2024	Jedinstvo	14	(0)
2024–2025	Jezero	28	(0)
2025–	FK Podgorica	1	(1)

International career
2011	Montenegro U19	1	(0)
2011–2014	Montenegro U21	8	(1)
- * Club domestic league appearances and goals as of 1 June 2025

Ermin Alić (born 23 February 1992) is a Montenegrin professional footballer who plays as a defender for FK Podgorica.

== Club career ==
Born in Bijelo Polje, Alić started his career in local club Jedinstvo, but later moved in Rudar Pljevlja, where he collected 50 First League appearances and scored one goal in two seasons. In summer 2013 he signed with Villarreal B, where he spent next two seasons. He made a three-year deal with Spartak Subotica in summer 2015, but he released after first half of 2015–16 season, after only one official appearance for Spartak. In the winter break off-season 2015–16, Alić returned to Rudar Pljevlja.

== International career ==
Alić was a member of the under-19 national selection, and used to be a captain of the under-21 squad.

In May 2016 he was part of Montenegro "B" team.
