= 2013 UEFA European Under-21 Championship qualification =

Football qualifying tournament

The 2013 UEFA European Under-21 Championship qualification was a series of parallel association football competitions held over 2011 and 2012 to decide the qualifiers for 2013 UEFA European Under-21 Championship, to be held in Israel. The draw for the qualifying rounds was held on 3 February 2011 in Nyon, with matches played between March 2011 and September 2012.

There were ten groups. Two of these groups had six teams; the remaining eight groups consisted of five teams. Group competition was a double round robin: each team hosted a game with every other team in its group. At the conclusion of qualifying, the team at the top of each group and four best second-placed teams qualified for the two-legged play-offs scheduled in October 2012, with the winner of each play-off tie qualifying for the finals.

== Seeds ==
A total of fifty-two participating teams were divided in five draw pots based on the UEFA Under-21 coefficient ranking. Pots A through D contained ten teams, while pot E twelve teams.

| Pot A | Pot B | Pot C | Pot D | Pot E |
|---|---|---|---|---|
| England; Spain; Netherlands; Italy; Sweden; Czech Republic; Russia; Serbia; Germany; Romania | Switzerland; Wales; Belarus; France; Ukraine; Turkey; Austria; Portugal; Denmark; Belgium | Croatia; Hungary; Scotland; Greece; Iceland; Slovakia; Moldova; Finland; Armenia; Northern Ireland | Poland; Montenegro; Georgia; Latvia; Norway; Slovenia; Republic of Ireland; Bulgaria; Bosnia and Herzegovina; Macedonia | Albania; Faroe Islands; Cyprus; Lithuania; Kazakhstan; Estonia; Azerbaijan; Andorra; San Marino; Luxembourg; Malta; Liechtenstein |

The UEFA executive committee has decided on its meeting on 27 January 2011 to have Bosnia and Herzegovina and Ukraine seeded in groups of six to avoid any group of five to potentially be reduced to four or three teams as a result of hypothetical suspension.

Before the draw UEFA confirmed that, for political reasons, Armenia would not be drawn against Azerbaijan (due to the dispute concerning territory of Nagorno-Karabakh) and Georgia would not be drawn against Russia (due to the dispute regarding the territory of South Ossetia) in the qualifiers for 2013 UEFA European Under–21 Football Championship.

== Tiebreakers ==
If two or more teams are equal on points on completion of the group matches, the following criteria are applied to determine the rankings.

1. Higher number of points obtained in the group matches played among the teams in question
2. Superior goal difference from the group matches played among the teams in question
3. Higher number of goals scored in the group matches played among the teams in question
4. Higher number of goals scored away from home in the group matches played among the teams in question
5. If, after applying criteria 1) to 4) to several teams, two or more teams still have an equal ranking, the criteria 1) to 4) will be reapplied to determine the ranking of these teams. If this procedure does not lead to a decision, criteria 6) and 7) will apply
6. Results of all group matches:
  1. Superior goal difference
  2. Higher number of goals scored
  3. Higher number of goals scored away from home
7. Position in the UEFA Under-21 coefficient ranking used for the group stage draw

== Qualifying group stage ==
=== Group 1 ===
| Pos | Team | Pld | W | D | L | GF | GA | GD | Pts | Qualification | (Germany) | (Bosnia and Herzegovina) | (Greece) | (Belarus) | (Cyprus) | (San Marino) |
|---|---|---|---|---|---|---|---|---|---|---|---|---|---|---|---|---|
| 1 | Germany | 10 | 9 | 1 | 0 | 39 | 9 | +30 | 28 | Play-offs | — | 3–0 | 1–0 | 3–0 | 4–1 | 7–0 |
| 2 | Bosnia and Herzegovina | 10 | 6 | 2 | 2 | 25 | 12 | +13 | 20 | | 4–4 | — | 4–0 | 3–0 | 5–1 | 3–1 |
| 3 | Greece | 10 | 4 | 1 | 5 | 14 | 15 | −1 | 13 | | 4–5 | 0–1 | — | 2–3 | 1–0 | 2–0 |
| 4 | Belarus | 10 | 4 | 1 | 5 | 11 | 17 | −6 | 13 | | 0–1 | 1–1 | 1–3 | — | 0–3 | 1–0 |
| 5 | Cyprus | 10 | 4 | 0 | 6 | 16 | 20 | −4 | 12 | | 0–3 | 2–1 | 0–2 | 1–3 | — | 6–0 |
| 6 | San Marino | 10 | 0 | 1 | 9 | 2 | 34 | −32 | 1 | | 0–8 | 0–3 | 0–0 | 0–2 | 1–2 | — |

=== Group 2 ===
| Pos | Team | Pld | W | D | L | GF | GA | GD | Pts | Qualification | (Sweden) | (Slovenia) | (Ukraine) | (Finland) | (Lithuania) | (Malta) |
|---|---|---|---|---|---|---|---|---|---|---|---|---|---|---|---|---|
| 1 | Sweden | 10 | 7 | 1 | 2 | 18 | 10 | +8 | 22 | Play-offs | — | 1–1 | 2–1 | 3–0 | 4–0 | 4–0 |
| 2 | Slovenia | 10 | 6 | 2 | 2 | 15 | 8 | +7 | 20 | | 2–1 | — | 2–0 | 1–1 | 2–0 | 2–1 |
| 3 | Ukraine | 10 | 5 | 2 | 3 | 21 | 10 | +11 | 17 | | 6–0 | 2–0 | — | 1–1 | 2–0 | 5–1 |
| 4 | Finland | 10 | 3 | 3 | 4 | 12 | 14 | −2 | 12 | | 0–1 | 1–0 | 1–2 | — | 3–4 | 0–0 |
| 5 | Lithuania | 10 | 3 | 0 | 7 | 9 | 18 | −9 | 9 | | 0–1 | 0–1 | 1–0 | 1–3 | — | 1–2 |
| 6 | Malta | 10 | 1 | 2 | 7 | 8 | 23 | −15 | 5 | | 0–1 | 1–4 | 2–2 | 1–2 | 0–2 | — |

=== Group 3 ===
| Pos | Team | Pld | W | D | L | GF | GA | GD | Pts | Qualification | (Czech Republic) | (Armenia) | (Montenegro) | (Wales) | (Andorra) |
|---|---|---|---|---|---|---|---|---|---|---|---|---|---|---|---|
| 1 | Czech Republic | 8 | 6 | 2 | 0 | 24 | 3 | +21 | 20 | Play-offs | — | 1–1 | 2–1 | 5–0 | 8–0 |
| 2 | Armenia | 8 | 4 | 3 | 1 | 11 | 5 | +6 | 15 | | 0–2 | — | 4–1 | 0–0 | 4–1 |
| 3 | Montenegro | 8 | 3 | 2 | 3 | 14 | 8 | +6 | 11 | | 0–0 | 0–0 | — | 3–1 | 4–0 |
| 4 | Wales | 8 | 3 | 1 | 4 | 7 | 10 | −3 | 10 | | 0–1 | 0–1 | 1–0 | — | 4–0 |
| 5 | Andorra | 8 | 0 | 0 | 8 | 2 | 32 | −30 | 0 | | 1–5 | 0–1 | 0–5 | 0–1 | — |

=== Group 4 ===
| Pos | Team | Pld | W | D | L | GF | GA | GD | Pts | Qualification | (Serbia) | (Denmark) | (North Macedonia) | (Northern Ireland) | (Faroe Islands) |
|---|---|---|---|---|---|---|---|---|---|---|---|---|---|---|---|
| 1 | Serbia | 8 | 5 | 3 | 0 | 17 | 4 | +13 | 18 | Play-offs | — | 0–0 | 5–1 | 1–0 | 5–1 |
| 2 | Denmark | 8 | 4 | 4 | 0 | 19 | 8 | +11 | 16 | Play-offs | 1–1 | — | 6–5 | 3–0 | 4–0 |
| 3 | Macedonia | 8 | 3 | 3 | 2 | 14 | 15 | −1 | 12 | | 1–1 | 1–1 | — | 1–0 | 1–0 |
| 4 | Northern Ireland | 8 | 1 | 1 | 6 | 5 | 13 | −8 | 4 | | 0–2 | 0–3 | 1–3 | — | 4–0 |
| 5 | Faroe Islands | 8 | 0 | 3 | 5 | 3 | 18 | −15 | 3 | | 0–2 | 1–1 | 1–1 | 0–0 | — |

=== Group 5 ===
| Pos | Team | Pld | W | D | L | GF | GA | GD | Pts | Qualification | (Spain) | (Switzerland) | (Georgia (country)) | (Croatia) | (Estonia) |
|---|---|---|---|---|---|---|---|---|---|---|---|---|---|---|---|
| 1 | Spain | 8 | 7 | 1 | 0 | 27 | 2 | +25 | 22 | Play-offs | — | 3–0 | 2–0 | 6–0 | 6–0 |
| 2 | Switzerland | 8 | 5 | 2 | 1 | 15 | 4 | +11 | 17 | Play-offs | 0–0 | — | 5–0 | 4–0 | 3–0 |
| 3 | Georgia | 8 | 3 | 1 | 4 | 8 | 18 | −10 | 10 | | 2–7 | 0–1 | — | 1–1 | 2–1 |
| 4 | Croatia | 8 | 2 | 1 | 5 | 7 | 16 | −9 | 7 | | 0–2 | 1–2 | 0–1 | — | 4–0 |
| 5 | Estonia | 8 | 0 | 1 | 7 | 2 | 19 | −17 | 1 | | 0–1 | 0–0 | 1–2 | 0–1 | — |

=== Group 6 ===
| Pos | Team | Pld | W | D | L | GF | GA | GD | Pts | Qualification | (Russia) | (Portugal) | (Poland) | (Moldova) | (Albania) |
|---|---|---|---|---|---|---|---|---|---|---|---|---|---|---|---|
| 1 | Russia | 8 | 5 | 2 | 1 | 17 | 5 | +12 | 17 | Play-offs | — | 2–1 | 4–1 | 2–2 | 0–0 |
| 2 | Portugal | 8 | 4 | 3 | 1 | 15 | 6 | +9 | 15 | | 1–0 | — | 1–1 | 5–0 | 3–1 |
| 3 | Poland | 8 | 3 | 2 | 3 | 13 | 13 | 0 | 11 | | 0–2 | 0–0 | — | 0–1 | 4–3 |
| 4 | Moldova | 8 | 2 | 1 | 5 | 10 | 24 | −14 | 7 | | 0–6 | 0–2 | 2–4 | — | 2–1 |
| 5 | Albania | 8 | 1 | 2 | 5 | 11 | 18 | −7 | 5 | | 0–1 | 2–2 | 0–3 | 4–3 | — |

=== Group 7 ===
| Pos | Team | Pld | W | D | L | GF | GA | GD | Pts | Qualification | (Italy) | (Turkey) | (Republic of Ireland) | (Hungary) | (Liechtenstein) |
|---|---|---|---|---|---|---|---|---|---|---|---|---|---|---|---|
| 1 | Italy | 8 | 6 | 1 | 1 | 27 | 8 | +19 | 19 | Play-offs | — | 2–0 | 2–4 | 2–0 | 7–0 |
| 2 | Turkey | 8 | 5 | 0 | 3 | 13 | 7 | +6 | 15 | | 0–2 | — | 1–0 | 2–1 | 6–1 |
| 3 | Republic of Ireland | 8 | 4 | 1 | 3 | 15 | 10 | +5 | 13 | | 2–2 | 0–1 | — | 2–1 | 2–0 |
| 4 | Hungary | 8 | 4 | 0 | 4 | 11 | 10 | +1 | 12 | | 0–3 | 1–0 | 2–1 | — | 2–0 |
| 5 | Liechtenstein | 8 | 0 | 0 | 8 | 4 | 35 | −31 | 0 | | 2–7 | 0–3 | 1–4 | 0–4 | — |

=== Group 8 ===
| Pos | Team | Pld | W | D | L | GF | GA | GD | Pts | Qualification | (England) | (Norway) | (Belgium) | (Azerbaijan) | (Iceland) |
|---|---|---|---|---|---|---|---|---|---|---|---|---|---|---|---|
| 1 | England | 8 | 7 | 0 | 1 | 24 | 3 | +21 | 21 | Play-offs | — | 1–0 | 4–0 | 6–0 | 5–0 |
| 2 | Norway | 8 | 5 | 1 | 2 | 13 | 7 | +6 | 16 | Play-offs | 1–2 | — | 2–2 | 1–0 | 2–1 |
| 3 | Belgium | 8 | 3 | 2 | 3 | 17 | 15 | +2 | 11 | | 2–1 | 1–3 | — | 4–1 | 5–0 |
| 4 | Azerbaijan | 8 | 2 | 1 | 5 | 6 | 18 | −12 | 7 | | 0–2 | 0–2 | 2–2 | — | 1–0 |
| 5 | Iceland | 8 | 1 | 0 | 7 | 4 | 21 | −17 | 3 | | 0–3 | 0–2 | 2–1 | 1–2 | — |

=== Group 9 ===
| Pos | Team | Pld | W | D | L | GF | GA | GD | Pts | Qualification | (France) | (Slovakia) | (Romania) | (Kazakhstan) | (Latvia) |
|---|---|---|---|---|---|---|---|---|---|---|---|---|---|---|---|
| 1 | France | 8 | 7 | 0 | 1 | 19 | 2 | +17 | 21 | Play-offs | — | 2–0 | 3–0 | 2–0 | 3–0 |
| 2 | Slovakia | 8 | 5 | 0 | 3 | 17 | 7 | +10 | 15 | Play-offs | 2–1 | — | 0–2 | 6–0 | 2–0 |
| 3 | Romania | 8 | 4 | 2 | 2 | 11 | 6 | +5 | 14 | | 0–2 | 2–0 | — | 0–0 | 2–0 |
| 4 | Kazakhstan | 8 | 0 | 4 | 4 | 2 | 14 | −12 | 4 | | 0–3 | 0–1 | 1–1 | — | 0–0 |
| 5 | Latvia | 8 | 0 | 2 | 6 | 1 | 21 | −20 | 2 | | 0–3 | 0–6 | 0–4 | 1–1 | — |

=== Group 10 ===
| Pos | Team | Pld | W | D | L | GF | GA | GD | Pts | Qualification | (Netherlands) | (Scotland) | (Bulgaria) | (Austria) | (Luxembourg) |
|---|---|---|---|---|---|---|---|---|---|---|---|---|---|---|---|
| 1 | Netherlands | 8 | 6 | 1 | 1 | 21 | 3 | +18 | 19 | Play-offs | — | 1–2 | 5–0 | 4–1 | 4–0 |
| 2 | Scotland | 8 | 3 | 4 | 1 | 16 | 9 | +7 | 13 | | 0–0 | — | 0–0 | 2–2 | 3–0 |
| 3 | Bulgaria | 8 | 3 | 3 | 2 | 11 | 12 | −1 | 12 | | 0–1 | 2–2 | — | 1–1 | 3–2 |
| 4 | Austria | 8 | 3 | 2 | 3 | 15 | 14 | +1 | 11 | | 0–1 | 3–2 | 0–2 | — | 4–1 |
| 5 | Luxembourg | 8 | 0 | 0 | 8 | 6 | 31 | −25 | 0 | | 0–5 | 1–5 | 1–3 | 1–4 | — |

=== Ranking of second-placed teams ===
Because some groups contain six teams and some five, matches against the sixth-placed team in each group are not included in this ranking. As a result, eight matches played by each team will count for the purposes of the second-placed table.

==== Tiebreakers ====
The following criteria were applied to determine the rankings.

1. Higher number of points obtained in these matches
2. Superior goal difference from these matches
3. Higher number of goals scored in these matches
4. Higher number of away goals scored in these matches
5. Position in the UEFA Under-21 coefficient ranking used for the group stage draw

| Pos | Grp | Team | Pld | W | D | L | GF | GA | GD | AG | Pts | Qualification |
|---|---|---|---|---|---|---|---|---|---|---|---|---|
| 1 | 5 | Switzerland | 8 | 5 | 2 | 1 | 15 | 4 | +11 | 3 | 17 | Play-offs |
| 2 | 4 | Denmark | 8 | 4 | 4 | 0 | 19 | 8 | +11 | 5 | 16 | Play-offs |
| 3 | 8 | Norway | 8 | 5 | 1 | 2 | 13 | 7 | +6 | 7 | 16 | Play-offs |
| 4 | 9 | Slovakia | 8 | 5 | 0 | 3 | 17 | 7 | +10 | 7 | 15 | Play-offs |
| 5 | 6 | Portugal | 8 | 4 | 3 | 1 | 15 | 6 | +9 | 5 | 15 | |
| 6 | 7 | Turkey | 8 | 5 | 0 | 3 | 13 | 7 | +6 | 4 | 15 | |
| 7 | 3 | Armenia | 8 | 4 | 3 | 1 | 11 | 5 | +6 | 3 | 15 | |
| 8 | 1 | Bosnia and Herzegovina | 8 | 4 | 2 | 2 | 19 | 11 | +8 | 3 | 14 | |
| 9 | 2 | Slovenia | 8 | 4 | 2 | 2 | 9 | 6 | +3 | 2 | 14 | |
| 10 | 10 | Scotland | 8 | 3 | 4 | 1 | 16 | 9 | +7 | 11 | 13 | |

== Play-offs ==
The play-offs for the tournament finals were held between 11 and 16 October 2012. The seven winners qualified for the final tournament in Israel.

=== Seedings ===
The draw for the play-offs was held on 14 September 2012 in Nyon to determine the seven pairings as well as the order of the home and away ties. The seven group winners with the highest competition coefficients have been seeded and those teams were drawn against the unseeded teams. Nations from the same group could not be drawn against each other.

Each nation's coefficient was generated by calculating:

- 40% of the average ranking points per game earned in the 2013 UEFA European Under-21 Championship qualifying group stage.
- 40% of the average ranking points per game earned in the 2011 UEFA European Under-21 Championship qualifying stage and final tournament.
- 20% of the average ranking points per game earned in the 2009 UEFA European Under-21 Championship qualifying stage and final tournament.

The seedings are as follows:

| Pot A (seeded) | | Pot B (unseeded) | |
| Team | Coeff | Team | Coeff |
|---|---|---|---|
| Spain | 40,391 | Switzerland | 34,034 |
| Czech Republic | 36,189 | Sweden | 32,482 |
| England | 35,601 | Russia | 31,772 |
| Netherlands | 34,400 | Serbia | 30,470 |
| Germany | 34,063 | Denmark | 29,841 |
| Italy | 33,508 | Slovakia | 27,802 |
| France | 32,517 | Norway | 24,564 |

=== Matches ===
| Team 1 | Agg. | Team 2 | 1st leg | 2nd leg |
|---|---|---|---|---|
| Spain | 8–1 | Denmark | 5–0 | 3–1 |
| Italy | 4–2 | Sweden | 1–0 | 3–2 |
| Czech Republic | 2–4 | Russia | 0–2 | 2–2 |
| Slovakia | 0–4 | Netherlands | 0–2 | 0–2 |
| Germany | 4–2 | Switzerland | 1–1 | 3–1 |
| England | 2–0 | Serbia | 1–0 | 1–0 |
| France | 4–5 | Norway | 1–0 | 3–5 |

== Top goalscorers ==
The top scorers in the 2013 UEFA European Under-21 Championship qualification were as follows. Players in italics have also played in the play-offs.

| Rank | Name | Goals | Apps | Minutes played |
|---|---|---|---|---|
| 1 | (Spain) Rodrigo | 11 | 9 | 651' |
| 2 | (Czech Republic) Jan Chramosta | 9 | 5 | 294' |
| 3 | (Netherlands) Género Zeefuik | 8 | 7 | 362' |
| 3 | (Scotland) Jordan Rhodes | 8 | 6 | 491' |
| 3 | (Germany) Peniel Mlapa | 8 | 11 | 665' |
| 6 | (Russia) Fyodor Smolov | 7 | 9 | 584' |
| 7 | (Bosnia and Herzegovina) Milan Đurić | 6 | 4 | 251' |
| 7 | (Italy) Manolo Gabbiadini | 6 | 7 | 424' |
| 7 | (Sweden) Mikael Ishak | 6 | 7 | 513' |
| 7 | (Albania) Armando Sadiku | 6 | 7 | 523' |
| 7 | (Spain) Isco | 6 | 10 | 781' |
| 7 | (Bosnia and Herzegovina) Nemanja Bilbija | 6 | 10 | 842' |
