= Juraj Vavrík =

Slovak footballer

Personal information
- Full name: Juraj Vavrík
- Date of birth: 2 September 1991 (age 35)
- Place of birth: Ilava, Czechoslovakia
- Height: 1.84 m (6 ft 0 in)
- Position: Midfielder

Youth career
- Dubnica

Senior career*
Years	Team	Apps	(Gls)
2008–2011	Dubnica	73	(3)
2011–2016	Ružomberok	49	(4)

International career^{‡}
2009–2010	Slovakia U19	10	(1)
2010–2011	Slovakia U21	12	(4)
- * Club domestic league appearances and goals as of 19 February 2017 ‡ National team caps and goals as of 2 June 2012

Juraj Vavrík (born 2 September 1991) is a Slovak footballer who currently plays as a midfielder.

== Club career ==
In August 2011, he joined Slovak club MFK Ružomberok on a four-year contract.
