= Massimo Martino =

Luxembourgish footballer

Personal information
- Full name: Massimo Martino
- Date of birth: 18 September 1990 (age 36)
- Place of birth: Luxembourg
- Height: 1.80 m (5 ft 11 in)
- Position: Centre back

Youth career
- –2006: Racing FC Union Luxembourg

Senior career*
Years	Team	Apps	(Gls)
2007–2009	Racing FC Union Luxembourg	22	(0)
2009	Jeunesse Esch	0	(0)
2009–2010	Wuppertaler SV	1	(0)
2010–2012	FC RM Hamm Benfica	43	(1)
2012–2015	F91 Dudelange	29	(1)
2014–2015	→ CS Grevenmacher (loan)	21	(2)
2015–2016	CS Fola Esch	10	(0)
2017–2021	UN Käerjéng 97	35	(2)

International career^{‡}
2008–2013	Luxembourg	17	(0)
2009–2012	Luxembourg U-21	9	(1)
- * Club domestic league appearances and goals as of 27 June 2023 ‡ National team caps and goals as of 3 June 2016

Massimo Martino (born 18 September 1990) is a former Luxembourgish football player who last played for UN Käerjéng 97.

== Career ==
Martino began his career with Racing FC Union Luxembourg and signed in January 2009 for Jeunesse Esch, after just a half-year left Esch to sign for Wuppertaler SV on 20 July 2009.

== International career ==
Martino made his debut for Luxembourg in a friendly match against Cape Verde on 27 May 2008. He made a second appearance against Belgium, Luxembourg drew both matches 1–1.
