= Albert Taar =

Estonian footballer

Personal information
- Date of birth: 15 January 1990 (age 36)
- Place of birth: Sillamäe, then part of Estonian SSR, Soviet Union
- Height: 1.82 m (6 ft 0 in)
- Position: Midfielder

Team information
- Current team: Maardu Linnameeskond
- Number: 8

Youth career
- JK Sillamäe Kalev

Senior career*
Years	Team	Apps	(Gls)
2006–2008	Sillamäe Kalev	62	(6)
2008	Kohtla-Järve JK Alko	6	(1)
2009	Viljandi JK Tulevik	33	(2)
2009	Viljandi JK Tulevik II	4	(1)
2010	Flora	3	(0)
2010	Flora II	18	(1)
2010	Sillamäe Kalev	9	(0)
2011–2013	Levadia	55	(9)
2011–2013	Levadia II	19	(2)
2013	Narva Trans	33	(7)
2014	Wisła Płock	7	(0)
2014	FCI Tallinn	10	(2)
2018–2024	FC Tallinn	162	(47)
2025–	Maardu Linnameeskond	34	(10)

International career
2008–2009	Estonia U19	20	(1)
2009–2012	Estonia U21	19	(1)
2010–2013	Estonia U23	4	(0)
- * Club domestic league appearances and goals as of 24 July 2026

Albert Taar (born 15 January 1990) is an Estonian professional footballer who plays as a midfielder for Esiliiga B club Maardu Linnameeskond. He was the highest goalscorer for JK Narva Trans in 2013. In December 2014, he was given a four-year ban for participating in betting activities while playing football, a violation of the Estonian Football Association's rules.

== Club career ==
Taar briefly played for Wisła Płock during the 2013–14 season. In 2018, after serving his ban, he began playing for Estonian 6th tier club FC Tallinn.
