= 2012 Scottish Youth Cup final =

- Event: 2011–12 Scottish Youth Cup
Celtic	Queen of the South
8	0
- Date: 23 April 2012
- Venue: Hampden Park, Glasgow
- Man of the Match: Dylan McGeouch
- Referee: Brian Colvin
- Attendance: 3,707

The 2012 Scottish Youth Cup final was the final match of the 2011–12 Scottish Youth Cup, the 28th season of the Scottish Youth Cup. It was played by the U19 sides of Celtic and Queen of the South.

== Route to the Final ==
=== Celtic ===
Round	Opposition	Score
Third Round	Kilmarnock	5–0
Fourth Round	Dunfermline Athletic	5–0
Quarter-final	Aberdeen	4–1
Semi-final	St Mirren	4–1

Celtic entered the competition in the Third Round where they came up against fellow SPL club Kilmarnock. Two early goals from Paul George and Callum McGregor set the tone for the match with a double from captain Jackson Irvine and a late strike from John Herron completing the scoring. Celtic then beat Dunfermline by the same scoreline in the fourth round of the cup. This time goals from Irvine, Atajic, Chalmers, Twardzik and Watt ensured their progression into the Quarter-Final stage where they came up against Aberdeen. Two goals from Filip Twardzik, as well as solitary goals from striker Tony Watt and John Heron saw off the challenge from the Dons'. In the semi-final, Celtic came from behind to book their place in their third consecutive Youth Cup Final. Two goals from Tony Watt and single strikes from John Heron and Filip Twardzik saw Celtic record a 4–1 victory over the Paisley outfit. This victory came at a cost, as top scorer Tony Watt was sent off after picking up two yellow cards, and thus missed the Youth Cup Final.

=== Queen of the South ===
Round	Opposition	Score
South Group	St Cuthbert Wanderers	7–1
Third Round	Berwick Rangers	3–2
Fourth Round	Greenock Morton	3–2
Quarter-final	Ayr United	2–1
Semi-final	Dundee United	5–4

Queen of the South made it to the final of the Youth Cup for the second time in their youth team's history. They overcame a South Group game first, beating St Cuthbert Wanderers 7–1 in their first game of the competition. Queen's were then drawn away to Berwick Rangers, and despite going a goal down came back to win 3–2 and book a place in the Quarter Finals against Greenock Morton. Again, drawn away at Cappielow they beat their opposition by the same scoreline, with the aide of extra time. They booked their place in the semi-finals of the youth cup seeing off rivals Ayr United 2–1 at Palmerston Park. After their initial semi-final against Dundee United was called off, it was re-arranged a week before the final itself in a game which had everything. Dundee United took the lead when Ryan Gauld latched onto a through ball before clinically slotting past the on-coming Queen's goalkeeper. Patrick Slattery equalised scoring direct from a corner, however Gauld regained United's lead with a brilliant curling finish from the edge of the box. Just after half-time Lewis Todd drew Queen's level with a fine drive from the edge of the box, before a double from Robert Thompson saw United take a 4–2 lead. However, two goals in the last ten minutes meant that the game would go into extra-time. First, Slattery grabbed his second of the game, before captain Scott Hooper converted a penalty with five minutes to go. Striker Gavin Reilly scored the winning goal, tapping in a cut-back from winger Dean Smith to send Queen's to their first final since 1986.

== Match details ==
23 April 2012
19:30

Celtic	8–0	Queen of the South
Twardzik 1'; Irvine 27'; McGeouch 42', 68'; McGregor 43' (pen.), 73', 85' (pen.); Herron 67'	Report Report

Hampden Park, Glasgow
Attendance: 3,707
Referee: Brian Colvin

Celtic	Queen of the South

GK	1	(Scotland) Robbie Thomson
RB	2	(England) Darnell Fisher
LB	3	(Scotland) Joseph Chalmers
MF	4	(Australia) Jackson Irvine	(c)
DF	5	(Scotland) Curtis Jones
DF	6	(Scotland) Marcus Fraser
MF	7	(Scotland) John Herron
MF	8	(Scotland) Callum McGregor
FW	9	(Scotland) Liam Gormley		(substituted off) 69'
FW	10	(Scotland) Dylan McGeouch		(substituted off) 73'
FW	11	(Czech Republic) Filip Twardzik		(substituted off) 37'
Substitutes:
GK	13	(Italy) Leonardo Fasan
DF	12	(England) Louis Kydd
MF	14	(Scotland) Michael Miller
FW	15	(England) James Alabi		(substituted on) 37'
FW	16	(Bosnia and Herzegovina) Bahrudin Atajic		(substituted on) 73'
Manager:
(Scotland) John Kennedy

GK	1	(England) Jim Atkinson
RB	2	(Scotland) Dean Crozier
CB	3	(Scotland) Craig Neill
CB	4	(Scotland) Sean Wilkinson
LB	5	(Scotland) Scott Hooper (c)	(substituted off) 75'
CM	6	(Scotland) Patrick Slattery
CM	7	(Scotland) Shaun Handling	(substituted off) 75'
LM	8	(Scotland) Lewis Todd
RM	9	(Scotland) Liam Park	(substituted off) 60'
FW	10	(Scotland) Gavin Reilly
FW	11	(Scotland) Dean Smith
Substitutes:
GK	12	(Scotland) Euan Drysdale
DF	14	(Scotland) Joe Young
MF	15	(Scotland) Ross Gray	(substituted on) 75'
MF	16	(Scotland) Josh Simpson	(substituted on) 75'
FW	17	(Scotland) Robert Vallance	(substituted on) 60'
Manager:
(England) Stuart Rome

Match officials

- Assistant referees: Gavin Harris and David McGeachie
- Fourth official: Colin Steven

Match rules

- 90 minutes
- 30 minutes of extra-time if necessary
- Penalty shoot-out if scores still level
- Five named substitutes
- Maximum of three substitutions
