= Luigi San Nicolás =

Andorran footballer

Personal information
- Full name: Luigi San Nicolás Schellens
- Date of birth: 28 June 1992 (age 34)
- Place of birth: Escaldes-Engordany, Andorra
- Height: 1.75 m (5 ft 9 in)
- Position: Striker

Team information
- Current team: Atlètic d'Escaldes
- Number: 7

Senior career*
Years	Team	Apps	(Gls)
2008–2011	FC Andorra	15	(0)
2011–2012	CE Principat		
2012–2013	FC Santa Coloma	18	(3)
2013–2014	FC Andorra	5	(0)
2014–2015	FC Ordino	22	(2)
2015–2017	FC Lusitanos	30	(9)
2017–2020	UE Engordany	62	(18)
2020–	Atlètic d'Escaldes		

International career^{‡}
2018–	Andorra	5	(0)
- * Club domestic league appearances and goals as of 15:32, 6 April 2021 (UTC) ‡ National team caps and goals as of 15:32, 6 April 2021 (UTC)

Luigi San Nicolás Schellens (born 28 June 1992) is an Andorran international footballer who plays for Atlètic d'Escaldes as a striker

== Career ==
Born in Escaldes-Engordany, San Nicolás has played club football for FC Andorra, CE Principat, FC Santa Coloma, FC Ordino, FC Lusitanos, UE Engordany and Atlètic d'Escaldes.

He made his international debut for Andorra in 2018.
