= David Cargill (footballer) =

Scottish footballer

Personal information
- Full name: David Anderson Cargill
- Date of birth: 21 July 1936
- Place of birth: Arbroath, Scotland
- Date of death: 20 November 2011 (aged 75)
- Place of death: Arbroath, Scotland
- Position: Winger

Senior career*
Years	Team	Apps	(Gls)
1953–1956	Burnley	5	(0)
1956–1958	Sheffield Wednesday	10	(0)
1958–1961	Derby County	56	(8)
1961	Lincoln City	9	(0)
1961–1965	Arbroath	85	(12)
- * Club domestic league appearances and goals

David Anderson Cargill (21 July 1936 – 20 November 2011) was a Scottish former professional footballer, who played as a left winger.
