= Miloš Radulović (footballer) =

Montenegrin footballer

Miloš M. Radulović
Personal information
- Full name: Miloš Radulović
- Date of birth: 23 February 1990 (age 36)
- Place of birth: Titograd, SFR Yugoslavia
- Height: 1.80 m (5 ft 11 in)
- Position: Right-back

Team information
- Current team: Internacional

Senior career*
Years	Team	Apps	(Gls)
2009–2014	Zeta	96	(1)
2010	→ Bratstvo Cijevna (loan)	2	(0)
2014	Mornar Bar	13	(1)
2015	Napredak Kruševac	9	(0)
2015	Mladost Podgorica	10	(0)
2016	Sutjeska	14	(0)
2016–2017	Zeta	10	(0)
2018	Sutjeska	8	(0)
2019	Grbalj	6	(0)
2019–2023	Kom		
2023–	Internacional	42	(1)

International career
2013	Montenegro U21	3	(0)
- * Club domestic league appearances and goals as of 18 June 2026

Miloš Radulović (Serbian Cyrillic: Милош Радуловић; born 23 February 1990) is a Montenegrin footballer who plays as a defender for FK Internacional.

He played with FK Napredak Kruševac in the 2014–15 Serbian SuperLiga, before moving to FK Mladost Podgorica.
