= 2013 UEFA European Under-21 Championship qualification play-offs =

The 2013 UEFA European Under-21 Championship qualification play-off ties were played over two legs, with the first legs scheduled on 11 and 12 October 2012 and the second legs on 15 and 16 October 2012. The seven winners qualified for the final tournament in Israel. Qualifying play-offs were the second stage of 2013 UEFA European Under-21 Championship qualification.

== Seedings ==
The draw for the play-offs was held on 14 September 2012 in Nyon to determine the seven pairings as well as the order of the home and away ties. The seven group winners with the highest competition coefficients have been seeded and those teams were drawn against the unseeded teams. Nations from the same group could not be drawn against each other.

Each nation's coefficient was generated by calculating:

- 40% of the average ranking points per game earned in the 2013 UEFA European Under-21 Championship qualifying group stage.
- 40% of the average ranking points per game earned in the 2011 UEFA European Under-21 Championship qualifying stage and final tournament.
- 20% of the average ranking points per game earned in the 2009 UEFA European Under-21 Championship qualifying stage and final tournament.

The seedings were as follows:

Pot A (seeded)		Pot B (unseeded)	
Team	Coeff	Team	Coeff
Spain	40,391	Switzerland	34,034
Czech Republic	36,189	Sweden	32,482
England	35,601	Russia	31,772
Netherlands	34,400	Serbia	30,470
Germany	34,063	Denmark	29,841
Italy	33,508	Slovakia	27,802
France	32,517	Norway	24,564

== Matches ==
Team 1	Agg.	Team 2	1st leg	2nd leg
Spain	8–1	Denmark	5–0	3–1
Italy	4–2	Sweden	1–0	3–2
Czech Republic	2–4	Russia	0–2	2–2
Slovakia	0–4	Netherlands	0–2	0–2
Germany	4–2	Switzerland	1–1	3–1
England	2–0	Serbia	1–0	1–0
France	4–5	Norway	1–0	3–5

=== First leg ===
11 October 2012
19:00

Slovakia	0–2	Netherlands
	Report	Van Ginkel 55', 82'

National Training Centre, Senec
Attendance: 3,260
Referee: Antony Gautier (France)

11 October 2012
20:45

Spain	5–0	Denmark
Rodrigo 16', 18', 21', 66'; Isco 79' (pen.)	Report

Estadio El Plantío, Burgos
Attendance: 12,161
Referee: Bobby Madden (Scotland)

12 October 2012
16:00

Czech Republic	0–2	Russia
	Report	Smolov 33', 74' (pen.)

Chance Arena, Jablonec nad Nisou
Attendance: 2,116
Referee: Ovidiu Haţegan (Romania)

12 October 2012
18:00

Germany	1–1	Switzerland
Rudy 82' (pen.)	Report	Drmić 87'

BayArena, Leverkusen
Attendance: 7,382
Referee: Antonio Mateu Lahoz (Spain)

12 October 2012
18:45

France	1–0	Norway
Varane 22'	Report

Stade Océane, Le Havre
Attendance: 6,720
Referee: Kristo Tohver (Estonia)

12 October 2012
19:00

England	1–0	Serbia
Dawson 65' (pen.)	Report

Carrow Road, Norwich
Attendance: 17,266
Referee: Deniz Aytekin (Germany)

12 October 2012
21:00

Italy	1–0	Sweden
Immobile 17'	Report

Stadio Adriatico, Pescara
Attendance: 11,102
Referee: Artur Soares Dias (Portugal)

=== Second leg ===
15 October 2012
19:00

Netherlands	2–0	Slovakia
Wijnaldum 56'; De Jong 68' (pen.)	Report

Sparta Stadion Het Kasteel, Rotterdam
Attendance: 8,850
Referee: Kenn Hansen (Denmark)

Netherlands won 4–0 on aggregate.

16 October 2012
14:30

Russia	2–2	Czech Republic
Smolov 6' (pen.); Kirillov 83'	Report	Wágner 12', 64'

Central Stadium, Yekaterinburg
Attendance: 20,000
Referee: Antti Munukka (Finland)

Russia won 4–2 on aggregate.

16 October 2012
17:30

Switzerland	1–3	Germany
Drmić 75'	Report	Holtby 8'; Sobiech 20'; Polter 45'

Swissporarena, Lucerne
Attendance: 10,277
Referee: Matej Jug (Slovenia)

Germany won 4–2 on aggregate.

16 October 2012
18:00

Sweden	2–3	Italy
Ishak 72'; Hiljemark 77'	Report	Insigne 68'; Florenzi 71'; Immobile 86'

Guldfågeln Arena, Kalmar
Attendance: 6,453
Referee: Michael Oliver (England)

Italy won 4–2 on aggregate.

16 October 2012
18:00

Serbia	0–1	England
	Report	Wickham 90+4'

Stadion Mladost, Kruševac
Attendance: 9,500
Referee: Hüseyin Göçek (Turkey)

England won 2–0 on aggregate.

16 October 2012
18:00

Norway	5–3	France
Singh 13' (pen.); Nielsen 19'; Rogne 27'; Konradsen 57'; Berget 66'	Report	Guilavogui 28'; Lacazette 84'; Griezmann 87'

Marienlyst Stadion, Drammen
Attendance: 2,150
Referee: Paolo Valeri (Italy)

Norway won 5–4 on aggregate.

16 October 2012
18:30

Denmark	1–3	Spain
Christiansen 90+1'	Report	Muniain 24'; Vázquez 62', 90+2'

Aalborg Stadion, Aalborg
Attendance: 5,282
Referee: Szymon Marciniak (Poland)

Spain won 8–1 on aggregate.
