= Roger Carré =

French footballer (1921–1996)

Personal information
- Full name: Roger Thomas Ghislain Carré
- Date of birth: 14 January 1921
- Place of birth: Roubaix, Nord, France
- Date of death: 2 November 1996 (aged 75)
- Place of death: Croix, Nord, France
- Height: 1.78 m (5 ft 10 in)
- Position: Midfielder

Senior career*
Years	Team	Apps	(Gls)
1943–1944	RC Roubaix		
1944–1950	Lille OSC		
1950–1954	RC Lens		

International career
1947–1949	France	2	(0)
- * Club domestic league appearances and goals

Roger Thomas Ghislain Carré (14 January 1921 – 2 November 1996) was a French footballer who played as a midfielder for Lille OSC and the French national team in the late 1940s. He was a member of the great Lille team of the late 1940s, which won the 1945–46 French Division 1 as well as back-to-back Coupe de France titles in 1947 and 1948, and finished as league runner-up four times in a row between 1948 and 1951.

== Playing career ==
=== Club career ===
Born on 14 January 1921 in Roubaix, Nord, Carré began his football career at his hometown club RC Roubaix in 1943, aged 22, where he quickly stood out from the rest, so in the following season, he was signed by Lille OSC, where he remained for six years, from 1944 until 1950.

Together with Jean Baratte, Marceau Somerlinck, and Roger Vandooren, Carré was a member of the great Lille team of the late 1940s, which won the 1945–46 French Division 1, the first edition after the end of the Second World War, as well as back-to-back Coupe de France titles in 1947 and 1948, starting in both finals, beating Strasbourg 2–0 in the former and Lens 3–2 in the latter. He also started in the 1949 final, where he assisted one of his side's consolation goals in an eventual 5–2 loss to his future club RC de France.

In 1950, Carré joined RC Lens, remaining there for four seasons, until 1954, when he retired at the age of 33.

=== International career ===
Carré made his debut for France on 26 May 1947, aged 26, in a friendly match against the Netherlands at Colombes, helping his side to a 4–0 win. He had to wait two years to earn his second international cap on 9 October 1949, in a 1950 FIFA World Cup qualifier against Yugoslavia, which ended in a 1–1 draw. On the following day, the journalists of the French newspaper L'Équipe stated that he had a difficult first-half because "he had received a harsh tackle to the ankle".

== Death ==
Carré died in Croix, Nord, on 2 November 1996, at the age of 75.

== Honours ==
Lille OSC

- Ligue 1:
  - Champions (1): 1945–46
  - Runner-up (3): 1947–48, 1948–49, 1949–50
- Coupe de France:
  - Champions (2): 1947 and 1948
  - Runner-up (1): 1949
