= Albert Dubreucq =

French footballer (1924–1995)

Personal information
- Full name: Albert Arthur Dubreucq
- Date of birth: 3 June 1924
- Place of birth: Lille, Nord, France
- Date of death: 13 October 1995 (aged 71)
- Place of death: Wasquehal, France
- Height: 1.78 m (5 ft 10 in)
- Position: Midfielder

Senior career*
Years	Team	Apps	(Gls)
1944–1945	Olympique Marcquois		
1945–1953	Lille OSC		
1953–1955	RC de France		
1955–1957	CA Paris		
1957–1958	RC Vichy		

International career
1952	France	1	(0)

Managerial career
- 1955–1956: CA Paris
- 1958–1961: Châteauroux
- 1962–1965: Calais
- 1965–1968: Mouscron
- 1968–1971: Cambrai
- 1975–1977: Excelsior
- 1977–1978: Mouscron
- 1978–1980: ES Arques
- * Club domestic league appearances and goals

Albert Arthur Dubreucq (3 June 1924 – 13 October 1995) was a French footballer who played as a midfielder for Lille OSC, RC de France, and CA Paris between 1945 and 1957. He also made one appearance for the French national team in 1952. He was the defensive midfielder of the great Lille team of the late 1940s, which won the 1945–46 French Division 1 as well as back-to-back Coupe de France titles in 1947 and 1948, and finished as league runner-up four times in a row between 1948 and 1951.

He later became a coach, taking charge of several French and Belgian teams in the 1960s and 1970s.

== Playing career ==
=== Club career ===
Born on 3 June 1924 in Lille, Nord, Dubreucq began his football career at his hometown club Olympique Marcquois in 1944, aged 20. He quickly stood from the rest, so in the following season, he was signed by Lille OSC, where he remained for eight years, from 1945 until 1953, scoring 7 goals in 236 official matches.

Together with Jean Baratte, Marceau Somerlinck, and Roger Vandooren, Dubreucq was a member of the great Lille team of the late 1940s, which won the 1945–46 French Division 1, the first edition after the end of the Second World War, as well as back-to-back Coupe de France titles in 1947 and 1948, starting in both finals, beating Strasbourg 2–0 in the former and Lens 3–2 in the latter. He also started in the 1949 final, where he assisted one of his side's consolation goals in an eventual 5–2 loss to his future club RC de France. On 24 June 1951, he started in the final of the 1951 Latin Cup, the forerunner of the European Cup, which ended in a 5–0 loss to AC Milan.

In 1953, Dubreucq joined RC de France, remaining there for two seasons, until 1955, when he went to CA Paris, with whom he played for two seasons, until 1957, when he moved to RC Vichy, where he retired in 1958.

=== International career ===
Dubreucq was called up to the French team during the qualifiers for the 1950 FIFA World Cup, but he had two wait two years, until 26 March 1952, to finally earn his first (and only) international cap in a friendly match against Sweden at the Parc de Princes, which ended in a 0–1 loss.

== Managerial career ==
Throughout his career, Dubreucq displayed his predilection to coach several times; for instance, when he was giving the pre-match instructions for the 1948 Cup final, the Lille coach André Cheuva "suddenly fell silent", and "he began to burst into tears". He began his managerial career as a player-coach at CA Paris in 1955–56, but soon become a full-time coach, taking charge of many clubs such as Châteauroux (1958–61), Calais (1962–65), Mouscron (1965–1968), Cambrai (1968–71), Excelsior (1975–1977), and Mouscron again (1977–78).

== Death ==
Dubreucq died in Darnétal on 13 October 1995, at the age of 71.

== Honours ==
Lille OSC

- Ligue 1:
  - Champions (1): 1945–46
  - Runner-up (4): 1947–48, 1948–49, 1949–50, 1950–51
- Coupe de France:
  - Champions (2): 1947 and 1948
  - Runner-up (1): 1949
- Latin Cup:
  - Runner-up (1): 1951
