= 1953 Coupe de France final =

- Event: 1952–53 Coupe de France
Lille	Nancy
2	1
- Date: 31 May 1953
- Venue: Olympique Yves-du-Manoir, Colombes
- Referee: Marcel Le Foll
- Attendance: 58,993

The 1953 Coupe de France final was a football match held at Stade Olympique Yves-du-Manoir, Colombes on May 31, 1953, that saw Lille OSC defeat FC Nancy 2–1 thanks to goals by Jean Vincent and Bernard Lefèvre.

== Match details ==
31 May 1953

Lille	2–1	Nancy
Vincent 17'; Lefèvre 81'		Belaid 41'

Stade Olympique Yves-du-Manoir, Colombes
Attendance: 58,993
Referee: Marcel Le Foll

GK	(France) César Ruminski
DF	(France) Antoine Pazur
DF	(France) Pierre Fuye
DF	(France) Guillaume Bieganski
DF	(Netherlands) Cor van der Hart
MF	(France) Marceau Somerlinck
MF	(Denmark) Erik Kuld Jensen
FW	(France) André Strappe
FW	(France) Jean Baratte	(c)
FW	(France) Jean Vincent
FW	(France) Bernard Lefèvre
Manager:
(France) André Cheuva Assistant Referees: Fourth Official:

GK	(France) Jacques Favre
DF	(France) Léo Cecchini
DF	(France) Hervé Collot
DF	(France) Ernest Nunge
DF	(France) Roger Mindonnet	(c)
MF	(France) Christian Bottolier
MF	(Saar Protectorate) Kurt Clemens
FW	(Argentina) Juan Carlos Lorenzo
FW	(France) Bachir Belaid
FW	(France) Roger Piantoni
FW	(France) Léon Deladerrière
Manager:
(France) Jacques Favre

== See also ==
- 1952–53 Coupe de France
