= 1948 Coupe de France final =

- Event: 1947–48 Coupe de France
Lille	Lens
3	2
- Date: 10 May 1948
- Venue: Olympique Yves-du-Manoir, Colombes
- Referee: Léon Boes
- Attendance: 60,739

The 1948 Coupe de France final was a football match held at Stade Olympique Yves-du-Manoir, Colombes on 10 May 1948, that saw Lille OSC defeat RC Lens 3–2 thanks to goals by Roger Vandooren and Jean Baratte (2).

== Match details ==
10 May 1948

Lille	3–2	Lens
Vandooren 23'; Baratte 52', 86'		Stanis 39', 77'

Stade Olympique Yves-du-Manoir, Colombes
Attendance: 60,739
Referee: Léon Boes

GK	(France) Félix Witkowski
DF	(France) Joseph Jadrejak
DF	(France) Marceau Sommerlynck
DF	(France) Albert Dubreucq
DF	(France) Jean-Marie Prevost
MF	(France) Jules Bigot	(c)
MF	(France) Roger Vandooren
FW	(France) (Poland) Bolek Tempowski
FW	(France) Jean Baratte
FW	(France) Roger Carré
FW	(France) Jean Lechantre
Manager:
(France) André Cheuva Assistant Referees: Fourth Official:

GK	(France) Georges Duffuler
DF	(France) René Gouillard
DF	(France) Ellias Mellul
DF	(France) (Hungary) Ladislas Smid "Siklo"
DF	(France) Stanislas Golinski
MF	(France) Marcel Ourdouillié	c)
MF	(France) Jean Mankowski
FW	(France) Maryan Jedrzeszczak "Marresch"
FW	(France) (West Germany) Stefan Dembicki "Stanis"
FW	(France) Maryan Pachurka
FW	(France) Michel Habera
Manager:
(France) Nicolas Hisbst

== See also ==
- 1947–48 Coupe de France
