= Egon Johnsson =

Swedish footballer (1926–1985)

Personal information
- Date of birth: 6 December 1926
- Place of birth: Höganäs, Sweden
- Date of death: 20 July 1985 (aged 58)
- Position: Forward

Youth career
- Öresunds BK
- Utbynäs SK
- Vårgårda IK
- Höganäs BK
- Redbergslids IK

Senior career*
Years	Team	Apps	(Gls)
1948–1950	GAIS	43	(23)
1950–1954	Stade Français	130	(74)
1955–1957	Lens	66	(52)
1957–1958	FC Nancy	41	(29)
1958–1959	Lausanne Sports	34	(18)
1959–1960	Toulon	17	(9)
1960–1962	Yverdon Sport	39	(25)
Total		370	(230)

International career
1949	Sweden	2	(1)
- * Club domestic league appearances and goals

Egon Johnsson (6 December 1926 – 20 July 1985) was a Swedish professional footballer who played as a forward.

Nicknamed "Atom-Egon," he started off his career with GAIS in Sweden before signing with Stade Français in 1950. He then went on to represent Lens, FC Nancy, Lausanne Sports, and Toulon before finishing up his career with Yverdon Sport in Switzerland in 1962. A prolific goal scorer, Johnsson was the Ligue 2 top scorer during the 1951–52 and 1957–58 seasons.

Johnsson won two caps for the Sweden national team in 1949, and scored one goal. His last name is sometimes incorrectly listed as "Jönsson," "Jonsson," or "Johansson."

== Club career ==
=== Early career ===
Born in Höganäs, Johnsson began his footballing career with Öresunds BK before moving on to represent Utbynäs SK, Vårgårda IK, Höganäs BK, and Redbergslids IK until signing for the Allsvenskan club GAIS in 1948. While at GAIS, Johnsson helped the team finish third in the 1948–49 Allsvenskan by scoring 14 goals in 21 games. The following season, Johnsson scored 9 goals in 22 games as GAIS finished 5th. It was at GAIS that Johnsson earned the nickname "Atom-Egon," referring to his strong physique and powerful shooting skills.

=== Stade Français ===
Johnsson signed for Stade Français in France ahead of the 1950–51 season of the French Division 1. Despite Johnsson's 12 goals in 33 games in his debut season, Stade Français was relegated after finishing last in the division. The following season Johnsson was the top scorer with 34 goals in 34 games as Stade Français won the 1951–52 French Division 2. Stade Français was once again relegated from the French Division 1 after the 1953–54 season. After half a season in the French Division 2, Johnsson left the club to sign for French Division 1 club Lens.

=== Lens ===
Johnsson finished second with RC Lens in league play in both the 1955–56 and 1956–57 seasons, scoring the third most goals in the league in 1956–57 with 29 goals in 32 games. He was a part of the RC Lens team that finished second in the 1957 Coupe Charles Drago.

=== FC Nancy ===
Johnsson signed for the French Division 2 club FC Nancy in 1957. Just like six years prior, Johnsson managed to become the French Division 2 top scorer, scoring 29 goals in 41 games during the 1957–58 season. Johnsson's goals helped FC Nancy finish at the top of the French Division 2 table, winning Johnsson his second division title and securing the club a spot in the next season's top flight. Johnsson left the club at the end of the season after only one year.

=== Lausanne Sports and return to France ===
In 1958, Johnsson moved to Switzerland to play for Lausanne Sports in the Nationalliga A. He scored 18 goals in 34 goals for the Swiss club before leaving the club halfway into the 1959–60 season to return to France. Johnsson signed a contract with the French Division 1 team Toulon in early 1960. Once again he experienced relegation, as Toulon finished the season in the relegation zone of the 1959–60 French Division 1. However, Johnsson still had a prolific time at the club, scoring 9 goals in 17 games during the spring of 1960.

=== Return to Switzerland and retirement ===
After only half a year in France, Johnsson returned to Switzerland to sign for the Nationalliga B club Yverdon Sport. He spent two seasons with the club as a player-coach and scored 25 goals in 39 games before wrapping up his professional career to join the coaching staff at the Swiss third-tier club FC Martigny-Sports.

== International career ==
Johnson made his debut for the Sweden national team on 13 May 1949, scoring a goal on volley from 25 meters on a pass from Gunnar Gren in a 3–1 friendly win against England at Råsunda Stadium. This was Sweden's first ever victory against England. He won his second and final cap on 2 June 1949 in a 1950 FIFA World Cup qualifier against Ireland, which Sweden won 3–1.

== Personal life ==
Johnsson worked as a chiropractor after his footballing career, specializing in sports injuries. He died on 20 July 1985 at 58 years of age, after having battled an incurable disease.

== Career statistics ==
=== Club ===
Appearances and goals by club, season and competition
Club	Season	League			Cup		Continental		Other		Total	
Club	Season	Division	Apps	Goals	Apps	Goals	Apps	Goals	Apps	Goals	Apps	Goals
GAIS	1948–49	Allsvenskan	21	14								
GAIS	1949–50	Allsvenskan	22	9								
GAIS	Total		43	23								
Stade Français	1950–51	French Division 1	33	12								
Stade Français	1951–52	French Division 2	34	34								
Stade Français	1952–53	French Division 1	24	14								
Stade Français	1953–54	French Division 1	23	9								
Stade Français	1954–55	French Division 2	16	5								
Stade Français	Total		130	74								
Lens	1954–55	French Division 1	12	7								
Lens	1955–56	French Division 1	22	16								
Lens	1956–57	French Division 1	32	29								
Lens	Total		66	52								
FC Nancy	1957–58	French Division 2	41	29								
Lausanne Sports	1958–59	Nationalliga A	23	12								
Lausanne Sports	1959–60	Nationalliga A	11	6								
Lausanne Sports	Total		34	18								
Toulon	1959–60	French Division 1	17	9								
Yverdon Sport	1960–61	Nationalliga B	23	16								
Yverdon Sport	1961–62	Nationalliga B	16	9								
Yverdon Sport	Total		39	25								
Career total			370	230								

=== International ===
Appearances and goals by national team and year
National team	Year	Apps	Goals
Sweden	1949	2	1
Total		2	1

Scores and results list Sweden's goal tally first, score column indicates score after Johnsson goal.

International goal scored by Egon Johnsson
No.	Date	Venue	Opponent	Score	Result	Competition	Ref.
1	13 May 1949	Råsunda Stadium, Solna, Sweden	England	3–0	3–1	Friendly	

== Honours ==
Stade Français

- French Division 2: 1950–51

Nancy

- French Division 2: 1957–58

Individual

- French Division 2 top scorer: 1951–52, 1957–58
