= 1946–47 French Division 1 =

9th season of French Division 1

Division Nationale
- Season: 1946–47
- Champions: CO Roubaix-Tourcoing; 1st title
- Relegated: Lens; Bordeaux; Le Havre; FC Rouen
- Matches: 380
- Goals: 1,334 (3.51 per match)
- Top goalscorer: Pierre Sinibaldi (33)

CO Roubaix-Tourcoing won Division 1 season 1946/1947 of the French Association Football League with 53 points.

== Participating teams ==
- Bordeaux
- AS Cannes
- Le Havre AC
- RC Lens
- Lille OSC
- Olympique de Marseille
- FC Metz
- SO Montpellier
- FC Nancy
- RC Paris
- Red Star Olympique
- Stade de Reims
- Stade Rennais UC
- CO Roubaix-Tourcoing
- FC Rouen
- AS Saint-Étienne
- FC Sète
- Stade Français FC
- RC Strasbourg
- Toulouse FC
Location of teams in 1946–47 Division 1

== Final table ==
Pos	Team	Pld	W	D	L	GF	GA	GAv	Pts	Qualification or relegation
1	Roubaix-Tourcoing (C)	38	24	5	9	71	47	1.511	53	
2	Reims	38	22	5	11	72	40	1.800	49	
3	Strasbourg	38	21	7	10	79	50	1.580	49	
4	Lille	38	20	7	11	89	52	1.712	47	
5	Stade Français	38	19	8	11	72	58	1.241	46	
6	Marseille	38	17	11	10	69	55	1.255	45	
7	Red Star	38	15	9	14	56	61	0.918	39	
8	Cannes	38	17	4	17	57	66	0.864	38	
9	Rennes	38	16	6	16	67	78	0.859	38	
10	Metz	38	12	13	13	93	75	1.240	37	
11	Saint-Étienne	38	13	11	14	71	84	0.845	37	
12	Nancy	38	13	10	15	62	59	1.051	36	
13	Sète	38	12	11	15	65	79	0.823	35	
14	Toulouse	38	15	4	19	70	80	0.875	34	
15	Racing Paris	38	14	5	19	76	80	0.950	33	
16	Montpellier	38	14	5	19	59	71	0.831	33	
17	Lens (R)	38	12	7	19	67	72	0.931	31	Relegation to French Division 2
18	Bordeaux (R)	38	12	7	19	58	81	0.716	31	Relegation to French Division 2
19	Le Havre (R)	38	9	7	22	44	83	0.530	25	Relegation to French Division 2
20	Rouen (R)	38	7	10	21	37	63	0.587	24	Relegation to French Division 2

Rules for classification: Victory: 2 points, Draw: 1 point, Defeat: 0 points
(C) Champions; (R) Relegated

Promoted from Division 2, who will play in Division 1 season 1947/1948

- FC Sochaux-Montbéliard: Champion of Division 2
- Olympique Alès: Runner-up

== Results ==
Home \ Away	BOR	CAN	LHA	RCL	LIL	OM	MET	MON	FCN	RCP	RSO	REI	REN	CRT	ROU	STE	SÉT	SFF	RCS	TOU
Bordeaux		1–4	1–2	3–2	1–0	2–2	4–3	4–0	1–1	0–6	3–2	1–3	0–1	1–3	2–1	3–1	4–3	1–4	2–5	1–1
Cannes	2–0		2–1	2–0	0–2	2–1	1–0	2–2	2–1	1–0	1–0	1–0	0–2	3–1	3–1	7–0	5–2	1–0	2–2	3–2
Le Havre	1–0	1–0		0–2	1–4	1–1	1–2	2–0	3–2	0–1	0–0	1–0	2–2	0–3	4–1	0–0	5–1	2–3	1–2	0–2
Lens	1–0	2–1	8–0		3–3	0–0	5–1	1–2	2–3	5–2	2–0	1–1	5–1	3–1	1–1	1–1	1–1	0–1	2–1	3–1
Lille	4–1	8–2	3–0	1–1		5–1	5–3	5–3	4–1	3–1	3–0	5–0	2–0	0–1	0–0	4–3	2–3	5–0	2–2	1–1
Marseille	0–0	4–1	5–3	5–2	1–1		3–3	2–1	3–1	5–3	4–0	3–2	1–0	1–1	4–0	2–0	3–1	0–1	2–1	3–0
Metz	1–1	7–1	2–3	2–1	4–1	1–1		7–2	6–0	5–0	8–0	2–2	6–0	0–1	0–0	4–4	1–1	1–1	0–2	1–4
Montpellier	0–0	0–1	2–0	2–1	0–1	3–1	3–0		4–1	0–1	4–4	2–0	1–0	2–2	3–0	3–1	3–2	1–3	0–1	3–1
Nancy	2–4	0–0	7–0	2–0	3–1	1–1	3–1	3–1		0–2	0–1	1–3	7–0	2–0	0–0	1–1	3–1	0–0	1–0	3–1
Racing Paris	0–1	4–0	3–1	1–3	1–0	1–2	3–3	2–3	4–3		1–2	0–3	2–3	2–1	0–0	3–4	0–2	4–2	2–3	8–2
Red Star Olympique	2–1	2–0	1–0	6–2	5–1	2–2	3–1	1–1	1–2	1–3		1–0	1–1	2–0	4–1	0–0	1–1	2–0	0–2	2–1
Reims	3–1	5–1	3–1	3–1	1–0	1–0	0–1	4–0	1–0	2–1	1–0		1–0	1–2	3–0	5–0	3–0	5–1	3–0	3–1
Rennes	3–2	2–1	3–1	3–0	0–0	2–0	4–6	2–1	3–1	2–2	2–2	2–3		2–3	2–0	2–1	5–2	0–1	1–6	3–0
Roubaix-Tourcoing	4–1	1–0	1–0	5–2	1–0	2–0	2–1	2–1	1–1	2–1	2–0	1–1	2–3		1–0	7–3	2–1	1–3	2–0	1–0
Rouen	2–2	0–0	2–2	3–1	0–3	2–3	0–1	0–2	0–0	0–2	3–0	1–0	1–1	0–1		3–0	6–1	0–2	1–3	1–5
Saint-Étienne	4–2	4–3	2–0	4–1	2–1	3–1	6–2	3–0	2–2	0–3	3–1	1–1	1–5	2–0	1–0		1–1	1–1	1–1	4–2
Sète	6–1	2–1	1–1	2–1	2–1	1–1	2–2	1–0	2–2	2–2	1–1	2–1	5–0	2–5	1–3	2–1		3–1	1–2	1–0
Stade Français	0–1	2–0	4–4	3–1	0–2	4–1	0–0	6–2	1–0	2–2	0–1	3–2	5–3	4–3	0–1	3–0	1–1		2–4	5–1
Strasbourg	1–1	2–0	2–0	2–0	1–2	1–0	2–2	2–1	0–1	8–1	4–1	3–0	3–2	1–1	2–1	3–3	2–1	1–2		1–3
Toulouse FC	1–4	2–1	5–0	2–0	3–4	0–0	3–3	2–1	2–1	4–2	0–4	0–2	1–0	1–2	3–2	4–3	5–1	1–2	3–1	

Legend: Blue = home team win; Yellow = draw; Red = away team win.

== Top goalscorers ==
Rank	Player	Club	Goals
1	(France) Pierre Sinibaldi	Reims	33
2	(Luxembourg) Gustave Kemp	Metz	30
3	(France) Jean Baratte	Lille	28
4	(France) Marcel Poblome	Nancy	26
5	(France) Roger Planté	Bordeaux	25
6	(France) (Hungary) Désiré Koranyi	Sète	24
7	(France) (Austria) Henri Hiltl	Roubaix-Tourcoing	23
8	(France) Henri Baillot	Metz	21
8	(France) Curt Keller	Toulouse FC	21
8	(Hungary) István Nyers	Stade Français	21
