= List of foreign Ligue 1 players: M =

This is a list of foreign players in the French Ligue 1, which commenced play in 1932. The following players must meet both of the following two criteria:

1. Have played at least one Ligue 1 game. Players who were signed by Ligue 1 clubs, but only played in lower league, cup and/or European games, or did not play in any competitive games at all, are not included.
2. Are considered foreign, i.e., outside France and its dependencies (Guadeloupe, Martinique, Reunion Island or French Polynesia), determined by the following:

A player is considered foreign if he is not eligible to play for the national teams of France.

More specifically,

- If a player has been capped on international level, the national team is used; if he has been capped by more than one country, the highest level (or the most recent) team is used. These include French players with dual citizenship. Players who played for France but came as foreign players (such as Miguel Ángel Lauri) are also listed.
- If a player has not been capped on international level, his country of birth is used, except those who were born abroad from French parents or moved to France at a young age, and those who clearly indicated to have switched his nationality to another nation.

Clubs listed are those that the player has played at least one Ligue 1 game for.

Seasons listed are those that the player has played at least one Ligue 1 game in. Note that seasons, not calendar years, are used. For example, "1992–95" indicates that the player has played in every season from 1992–93 to 1994–95, but not necessarily every calendar year from 1992 to 1995.

In bold: players still active in Ligue 1 and their respective teams in current season.

== Madagascar ==
- Mathieu Acapandié – Nantes – 2025–26
- Augustin Andriamiharinosy – Angoulême – 1969–70
- Hervé Arsène – Lens – 1987–89, 1991–98
- Kenji-Van Boto – Auxerre – 2022–23
- Stéphane Collet – Nice, Strasbourg, Lens – 1994–96, 1996–2000
- Thomas Fontaine – Reims, Lorient – 2018–19, 2020–22
- Marco Ilaimaharitra – Sochaux – 2013–14
- Hamada Jambay – Marseille, Toulouse, Sedan – 1993–94, 1996–99, 2000–01, 2002–03
- Romain Métanire – Metz, Reims – 2014–15, 2018–19
- Jérémy Morel – Lorient, Marseille, Lyon, Rennes – 2006–22
- Lalaïna Nomenjanahary – Lens – 2014–15
- Andy Pelmard – Nice, Clermont – 2018–21, 2023–24
- Franck Rabarivony – Auxerre – 1992–98
- Éric Rabésandratana – AS Nancy, Paris SG – 1990–91, 1996–2001
- Albert Rafetraniaina – Nice – 2012–16
- Stéphan Raheriharimanana – Nice – 2015–16
- Haja Ralaikera – Martigues – 1993–95
- Tahina Randriamananantoandro – Lens – 2000–01
- Rayan Raveloson – Auxerre – 2022–23, 2024–25
- Adrien Trebel – Nantes – 2013–14

== Malawi ==
- Ernest Mtawali – Toulouse FC – 1997–98

== Mali ==
=== B ===
- Mamadou Bagayoko – Strasbourg, Ajaccio, Nantes, Nice – 1999–01, 2002–06, 2008–11
- Issa Baradji – AC Ajaccio – 2013–14
- Keita Omar Barrou – Nice – 1956–63
- Sékou Berthé – Troyes – 1999–2003
- Yves Bissouma – Lille – 2016–18

=== C ===
- **Adama Camara** – **Paris FC** – 2025–
- Amady Camara – Nantes – 2025–26
- Mamadou Camara – Troyes – 2021–22
- Mohamed Camara – Monaco – 2022–24
- **Ousmane Camara** – **Angers** – 2022–23, 2024–
- Éric Chelle – Valenciennes, Lens – 2006–08, 2009–11
- Adama Coulibaly – Lens, Auxerre – 1999–2012
- David Coulibaly – Lille – 1996–97
- Dramane Coulibaly – Marseille – 2000–01
- Fernand Coulibaly – Laval – 1987–88
- Kalifa Coulibaly – Nantes – 2017–22
- Lassana Coulibaly – Bastia, Angers – 2015–18, 2020–21
- Mamoutou Coulibaly – Auxerre – 2004–06
- Ousmane Coulibaly – Brest – 2010–13
- Senou Coulibaly – Dijon – 2018–21

=== D ===
- Amadou Dabo – Monaco – 1975–76
- Mana Dembélé – Guingamp – 2013–14, 2015–16
- Cheick Diabaté – Nancy, Bordeaux, Metz – 2009–17
- Fousseni Diabaté – Amiens – 2019–20
- Abdoulay Diaby – Lille – 2014–15
- Drissa Diakité – Nice, Bastia – 2005–12, 2013–15
- Mamadou Diakité – Metz – 2005–06
- Samba Diakité – Nancy – 2010–12
- Cheick Diallo – Troyes, Metz, Laval – 1975–81
- Mamadou Diallo – Nantes, Le Havre – 2004–07, 2008–09
- **Mamady Diambou** – **Brest** – 2026–
- Mahamadou Diarra – Lyon, Monaco – 2002–06, 2010–11
- Moussa Diarra – Toulouse – 2019–20, 2022–24
- Sigamary Diarra – Sochaux, Lorient, AC Ajaccio – 2003–05, 2009–14
- Fousseni Diawara – Saint-Étienne, Sochaux, AC Ajaccio – 2000–01, 2004–09, 2011–13
- Samba Diawara – Troyes – 1999–2000
- Bakaye Dibassy – Amiens – 2017–20
- Nouha Dicko – Paris FC – 2025–26
- Abdoulaye Doucouré – Rennes – 2012–16
- Cheick Doucouré – Lens – 2020–22
- Fodé Doucouré – Reims, Le Havre – 2020–22, 2025–27
- Mahamadou Doucouré – Nîmes – 2020–21
- Sékou Doucouré – Nantes – 2024–26
- Siriné Doucouré – Lorient – 2022–24
- Vincent Doukantié – Strasbourg – 2000–01
- **Kamory Doumbia** – Reims, **Brest** – 2021–
- Moussa Doumbia – Reims – 2018–22
- Tongo Doumbia – Rennes, Valenciennes, Toulouse – 2009–12, 2013–17

=== F ===
- Mamadou Fofana – Metz – 2019–21
- Mohamed Fofana – Toulouse, Reims – 2004–16

=== G ===
- Alimami Gory – Paris FC – 2025–26
- Daouda Guindo – Brest – 2025–26

=== H ===
- **Amadou Haidara** – **Lens** – 2025–
- Massadio Haïdara – Nancy, Lens, Brest – 2010–13, 2020–25

=== K ===
- **Nouhoum Kamissoko** – **Marseille** – 2025–
- Frédéric Kanouté – Lyon – 1997–2000
- Cédric Kanté – Strasbourg, Nice, Sochaux – 1999–2001, 2003–09, 2012–14
- Abdoulaye Keita – Bastia – 2012–17
- Alphousseyni Keita – Le Mans – 2007–10
- Cheick Keita – Reims – 2022–23
- Fantamady Keita – Rennes – 1972–75
- Habib Keïta – Lyon, Clermont – 2020–22, 2023–24
- Karounga Keita – Bordeaux – 1963–70
- Salif Keita – Saint-Étienne, Marseille – 1967–72, 1972–73
- Seydou Keita – Marseille, Lorient, Lens – 1999–2000, 2001–07
- Sidi Yaya Keita – Strasbourg, Lens – 2004–08
- Cheick Oumar Konaté – Clermont – 2022–24
- Famoussa Koné – Bastia – 2014–15
- Ibrahima Koné – Lorient – 2021–24
- Sidy Koné – Lyon – 2011–12
- Youssouf Koné – Lille, Lyon, Troyes, Ajaccio – 2013–14, 2015–17, 2018–20, 2021–23
- Rominigue Kouamé – Lille, Troyes – 2017–18, 2021–23
- Boubakar Kouyaté – Metz, Montpellier – 2020–25

=== M ===
- Modibo Maïga – Le Mans, Sochaux, Metz – 2007–12, 2014–15
- **Hamidou Makalou** – **Brest** – 2024–

=== N ===
- Mahamadou N'Diaye – Troyes – 2015–16
- Sikou Niakaté – Metz – 2021–22
- Adama Niane – Nantes, Troyes – 2014–15, 2017–18

=== P ===
- **Oumar Pona** – **Angers** – 2025–

=== S ===
- Falaye Sacko – Saint-Étienne, Montpellier – 2021–25
- Hadi Sacko – Bordeaux – 2012–15
- Modibo Sagnan – Montpellier – 2023–25
- **Souleymane Sagnan** – **Lens** – 2026–
- Bakary Sako – Saint-Étienne – 2009–13, 2021–22
- Mamadou Samassa – Le Mans, Marseille, Valenciennes – 2006–13
- Mamadou Samassa – Guingamp, Troyes – 2013–16, 2017–18
- Mamadou Sangaré – Lens – 2025–26
- Mahamé Siby – Strasbourg – 2020–22
- Amadou Sidibé – Auxerre – 2008–09
- Djibril Sidibé – Monaco, Bastia – 2001–02, 2004–05
- Kalidou Sidibé – Toulouse – 2018–20
- Dan Sinaté – Angers – 2025–26
- **Lassine Sinayoko** – Auxerre, **Paris FC** – 2022–23, 2024–
- Issouf Sissokho – Bordeaux – 2020–22
- Abdoul Sissoko – Brest – 2011–13
- Alpha Sissoko – Saint-Étienne – 2020–22
- Ibrahim Sissoko – Saint-Étienne – 2024–25
- Ibrahima Sissoko – Strasbourg, Nantes – 2018–24, 2025–26
- Mohamed Sissoko – Paris SG – 2011–13
- Niama Pape Sissoko – Reims – 2024–25
- Oumar Sissoko – AC Ajaccio – 2014–15
- Bakary Soumaré – Boulogne – 2009–10
- Samba Sow – Lens – 2009–10
- Boubacar Sylla – Lens – 2014–15
- Moussa Sylla – Monaco – 2017–20
- Yacouba Sylla – Rennes, Montpellier – 2015–17

=== T ===
- Ibrahima Tandia – Caen – 2011–12
- Brahim Thiam – Istres, Caen – 2004–05, 2007–08
- Ange Martial Tia – Reims – 2024–25
- Almamy Touré – Monaco – 2014–19
- Bassidiki Touré – Marseille, Toulouse FC (1937), FC Nancy, Nantes, Ajaccio – 1958–61, 1964–66, 1967–68
- Birama Touré – Nantes, Auxerre, Montpellier – 2013–16, 2022–23, 2024–25
- El Bilal Touré – Reims – 2020–22
- Abdou Traoré – Bordeaux, Nice – 2008–17
- Adama Traoré – Lille, Monaco, Metz – 2014–20
- Bakaye Traoré – Nancy – 2009–12
- Boubacar Traoré – Metz – 2020–22, 2025–26
- Charles Traoré – Troyes, Nantes – 2015–16, 2017–23
- Cheick Traoré – Troyes, Lens – 2018–19, 2020–21
- Djimi Traoré – Lens, Rennes, Monaco, Marseille – 2001–02, 2007–08, 2009–12
- **Hamari Traoré** – Reims, Rennes, **Paris FC** – 2015–16, 2017–23, 2025–
- Mahamane Traoré – Nice – 2006–10, 2012–14, 2015–16
- Moussa Traoré – Troyes – 1975–77
- Sammy Traoré – Nice, Paris SG, Auxerre – 2002–10

=== W ===
- Molla Wagué – Caen, Nantes – 2011–12, 2019–20

=== Y ===
- Mustapha Yatabaré – Boulogne, Guingamp, Montpellier – 2009–10, 2013–16
- Sambou Yatabaré – Caen, Bastia, Guingamp – 2008–09, 2010–11, 2012–15
- Issa Yatassaye – Troyes – 1975–78

=== Z ===
- Kévin Zohi – Strasbourg – 2017–21

== Malta ==
- Irvin Cardona – Monaco, Brest, Saint-Étienne – 2016–17, 2019–23, 2024–25
- Teddy Teuma – Reims – 2023–25

== Martinique ==
Note: As it is an overseas department of the French Republic, Martiniquais players listed here must also have played with the Martinique national team, which belongs to CONCACAF, although it is not a member of FIFA.

- Johan Audel – Lille, Valenciennes; Nantes – 2004–05, 2006–10, 2013–16
- **Ludovic Blas** – Guingamp, Nantes, **Rennes** – 2015–
- Patrick Burner – Nice, Nîmes – 2016–21
- Manuel Cabit – Metz – 2019–20
- Sébastien Carole – Monaco – 2001–03
- Michaël Citony – Rennes; Saint-Étienne – 1999–2001, 2002–03, 2004–05
- Ludovic Clément – Châteauroux, Toulouse – 1997–98, 2003–05
- Yannis Clementia – Nice – 2019–20
- Charles-Édouard Coridon – Guingamp, Lens, Paris SG – 1995–98, 1999–2005
- Steeve Elana – Caen, Brest, Lille – 2004–05, 2010–13
- Julien Faubert – Bordeaux – 2004–07, 2012–15
- Gaël Germany – Arles-Avignon – 2010–11
- Christopher Glombard – Reims – 2012–15
- Bruno Grougi – Brest – 2010–13
- Joan Hartock – Brest – 2012–13
- Christophe Hérelle – Troyes, Nice, Brest, Metz – 2017–24
- Wesley Jobello – Marseille – 2011–12
- Brighton Labeau – Amiens – 2017–18
- Steeven Langil – Auxerre; Valenciennes; Guingamp – 2008–09, 2010–11, 2013–14
- Mickael Malsa – Sochaux – 2013–14
- Rémi Maréval – Nantes – 2008–09
- Harry Novillo – Lyon – 2010–12
- Kévin Olimpa – Bordeaux – 2008–09, 2010–12, 2013–14
- Frédéric Piquionne – Rennes, Saint-Étienne, Monaco, Lyon – 2001–09
- Jérémie Porsan-Clémenté – Marseille, Montpellier – 2014–16, 2017–18
- Emmanuel Rivière – Saint-Étienne, Toulouse FC, Monaco, Metz – 2008–14, 2017–18
- Jérémy Sebas – Strasbourg – 2023–25
- Olivier Thomert – Lens, Rennes, Le Mans – 2002–10
- **Harold Voyer** – **Le Mans** – 2026–

== Mauritania ==
- Abdoul Ba – Lens – 2014–15
- Adama Ba – Brest, Bastia – 2011–14, 2015–16
- El Hadji Ba – Bastia – 2014–15
- **Aboulaye Camara** – **Nice** – 2026–
- Bahmed Deuff – Nantes – 2025–26
- **Mamadou Diop** – **Auxerre** – 2026–
- Guessouma Fofana – Amiens, Guingamp – 2017–19
- Djeidi Gassama – Paris SG – 2021–22
- Pascal Gourville – Sedan – 2000–01
- Diallo Guidileye – Brest, AS Nancy – 2011–13, 2016–17
- Abdelaziz Kamara – Saint-Étienne – 2005–06
- Aboubakar Kamara – Monaco, Dijon – 2014–15, 2020–21
- **Jordan Lefort** – Amiens, **Angers** – 2018–20, 2024–
- Pape Ndiaga Yade – Metz, Troyes – 2019–23

== Mauritius ==
- Jonathan Bru – Rennes – 2003–04
- Kévin Bru – Rennes – 2006–07
- Jacques-Désiré Périatambée – Le Mans – 2003–04, 2005–06
- Lindsay Rose – Valenciennes, Lyon, Lorient, Bastia – 2012–17

== Mexico ==
- Rafael Márquez – AS Monaco – 1999–2003
- Guillermo Ochoa – AC Ajaccio – 2011–14

== Montenegro ==
- Sreten Banović – Valenciennes – 1969–70
- Marko Baša – Le Mans, Lille – 2005–08, 2011–17
- Miladin Bečanović – Lille, Marseille, Le Havre – 1995–2000
- Milan Becić – Montpellier, Alès – 1932–33, 1934–36
- Branko Bošković – Paris SG, Troyes – 2003–06
- Goran Boškovic – Valenciennes – 1992–93
- Dragoljub Brnović – Metz – 1989–92, 1993–94
- **Andrija Bulatović** – **Lens** – 2025–
- Damir Čakar – Châteauroux – 1997–98
- Anto Drobnjak – Bastia, Lens – 1994–98
- Duško Đurišić – Sedan – 2001–03
- Vanja Grubač – Le Havre – 1995–96
- Stevan Jovetić – Monaco – 2017–21
- Vojin Lazarević – AS Nancy – 1970–72
- Nikola Nikezić – Le Havre – 2008–09
- Danijel Petković – Angers – 2019–20, 2021–22
- Ljubomir Radanović – Nice – 1990–91
- Niša Saveljić – Bordeaux, Sochaux, Bastia, Guingamp, Istres – 1997–2005
- Cvetko Savković – Bastia – 1971–73
- Vasilije Šijakovic – Grenoble – 1962–63
- Slobodan Vučeković – Bastia – 1979–80

== Morocco ==
=== A ===
- Zakariya Abarouai – Evian – 2014–15
- Yunis Abdelhamid – Dijon, Reims, Saint-Étienne – 2016–17, 2018–25
- Mohamed Abderrazack – Sète, Stade Français, Nîmes Olympique, Nice, Valenciennes, Lyon, Alès – 1945–51, 1952–59
- Yacine Abdessadki – Strasbourg, Toulouse FC – 2000–01, 2003–06, 2007–08
- Hicham Aboucherouane – Lille OSC – 2005–06
- Zakaria Aboukhlal – Toulouse – 2022–25
- Karim Achahbar – Guingamp – 2014–15
- Amine Adli – Toulouse – 2019–20
- **Nayef Aguerd** – Dijon, Rennes, **Marseille** – 2018–22, 2025–
- Abdeljalil Aïd – RC Paris – 1988–90
- Jamel Aït Ben Idir – Le Havre, Arles-Avignon – 2002–03, 2008–09, 2010–11
- Youssef Aït Bennasser – Nancy, Caen, Monaco, Saint-Étienne, Bordeaux – 2016–20
- **Abdelhamid Aït Boudlal** – **Rennes** – 2025–
- Karim Aït-Fana – Montpellier – 2009–15
- Hassan Akesbi – Nîmes Olympique, Reims, AS Monaco – 1955–64
- Sofiane Alakouch – Nîmes Olympique, Metz – 2018–22
- Jamal Alioui – Metz – 2005–06
- Rachid Alioui – Guingamp, Nîmes Olympique, Angers – 2013–14, 2015–16, 2018–22
- Hassan Alla – Le Havre – 2008–09
- Azzedine Amanallah – Niort – 1987–88
- Ayoub Amraoui – Nice – 2022–23
- Gharib Amzine – Strasbourg, Troyes – 1998–2003, 2005–07
- Houssaine Anafal – Rennes – 1974–75, 1976–77
- Abdallah Azhar – Reims, Grenoble – 1958–63

=== B ===
- Abdellah Baallal – Clermont – 2023–24
- Yacine Bammou – Nantes, Caen – 2014–19
- Abdelaziz Barrada – Marseille – 2014–16
- Amine Bassi – Nancy, Metz – 2016–17, 2021–22
- Salaheddine Bassir – Lille OSC – 2001–02
- Yanis Begraoui – Toulouse – 2022–24
- Reda Belahyane – Nice – 2022–24
- Chahir Belghazouani – Ajaccio – 2012–14
- Younès Belhanda – Montpellier, Nice – 2009–13, 2016–17
- **Yassin Belkhdim** – **Angers** – 2024–
- Alaa Bellaarouch – Strasbourg – 2023–24
- Sami Ben Amar – Nîmes – 2019–21
- Aziz Ben Askar – Caen – 2004–05
- Mohamed Ben Brahim – Sète, FC Nancy – 1945–52
- Omar Ben Driss – Nice, Nîmes – 1954–55, 1959–61
- Abdallah Ben Fatah – RC Paris – 1945–46
- Abdelsalem Ben Miloud – Marseille – 1947–56
- Abdesselem Ben Mohammed – Bordeaux, Nîmes Olympique – 1952–57
- Eliesse Ben Seghir – Monaco – 2022–26
- Driss Ben Tamir – Bordeaux – 1954–56
- Youssef Benali – Toulouse – 2014–16
- Abdelaziz Bennij – AS Nancy – 1991–92
- Yassine Benrahou – Bordeaux, Nîmes – 2018–21
- **Safouane Benzahra** – **Monaco** – 2026–
- Zakarya Bergdich – Lens – 2010–11
- Nabil Berkak – Troyes – 2002–03, 2005–07
- Mustapha Bettache – Nîmes – 1956–63
- Ayyoub Bouaddi – Lille – 2023–26
- Mohamed Bouassa – Lyon – 1967–69
- Ben Mohamed Bouchaïb – Marseille, CO Roubaix-Tourcoing, Montpellier – 1946–50, 1952–53
- Mohamed Chaoui Bouchaïb – Montpellier – 1946–47
- Benjamin Bouchouari – Saint-Étienne – 2024–25
- Aziz Bouderbala – RC Paris, Lyon – 1988–92
- Sofiane Boufal – Lille, Angers, Le Havre – 2014–16, 2020–22, 2025–26
- Nourdin Boukhari – Nantes – 2006–07
- Mehdi Bourabia – Grenoble – 2009–10
- Khalid Boutaïb – Gazélec Ajaccio – 2015–16

=== C ===
- Nassim Chadli – Nîmes, Troyes – 2020–22
- Fouad Chafik – Dijon – 2016–21
- Kamel Chafni – Ajaccio, Auxerre, Brest – 2005–06, 2007–13
- Marouane Chamakh – Bordeaux – 2002–10
- Mohammed Chaouch – Saint-Étienne, Metz, Nice – 1988–90, 1992–93, 1994–97
- Saïd Chiba – AS Nancy – 1999–2000
- Larbi Chicha – Marseille – 1955–57, 1958–59
- Mounir Chouiar – Dijon – 2019–21
- Mickaël Chrétien Basser – AS Nancy – 2005–11, 2016-17

=== D ===
- Manuel da Costa – AS Nancy – 2005–06
- Achraf Dari – Brest – 2022–24
- Mounir Diane – Lens – 2003–08
- Issa Diop – Toulouse – 2015–18
- **Sofiane Diop** – Monaco, **Nice** – 2018–19, 2020–
- Nabil Dirar – Monaco – 2012–17

=== E ===
- Boussa El Aouad – Lens – 1983–85
- Youssef El-Arabi – Caen, Nantes – 2008–09, 2010–11, 2025–26
- Neil El Aynaoui – Lens – 2023–25
- Brahim El Bahri – Le Mans – 2007–09
- Hakim El Bounadi – Sochaux – 2006–09
- Mustapha El Haddaoui – Saint-Étienne, Nice, Lens, Angers – 1987–90, 1991–94
- Oualid El Hajjam – Amiens, Troyes, Le Havre – 2017–19, 2021–22, 2023–24
- Alharbi El Jadeyaoui – Lens – 2014–15
- Abdelhamid El Kaoutari – Montpellier, Reims, Bastia – 2009–17
- Talal El Karkouri – Paris SG – 1999–02, 2003–04
- Bouchaib El Moubarki – Grenoble – 2008–09
- **Samir El Mourabet** – **Strasbourg** – 2025–
- Aziz El Ouali – Nîmes Olympique – 1991–93
- **Amine El Ouazzani** – **Angers** – 2026–
- Amin Erbati – Marseille, Arles-Avignon – 2008–09, 2010–11

=== F ===
- Abdelilah Fahmi – Lille, Strasbourg – 2000–05
- Fayçal Fajr – Caen – 2011–12, 2018–19
- Driss Fettouhi – Le Havre – 2008–09

=== G ===
- Ismaël Guerti – Metz – 2025–26

=== H ===
- Youssouf Hadji – Bastia, Rennes, AS Nancy – 2003–12, 2016–17
- **Achraf Hakimi** – **Paris SG** – 2021–
- Abdelkader Hamiri – Red Star, Stade Français, Cannes – 1945–47, 1948–49
- Hassan Hanini – Bordeaux, Lens – 1983–87
- **Amine Harit** – Nantes, **Marseille** – 2016–17, 2021–25, 2026–
- Hassan Harmatallah – Lens – 1977–78
- Larbi Hazam – Valenciennes – 1975–79
- Adil Hermach – Lens, Bastia – 2009–11, 2012–13
- Ilyes Housni – Paris SG, Le Havre – 2022–23, 2024–25

=== I ===
- **Hamza Igamane** – **Lille** – 2025–

=== J ===
- Yassine Jebbour – Rennes, Nancy, Montpellier, Bastia – 2010–16
- Abdelkrim Jinani – Rennes – 1997–98

=== K ===
- Hassan Kachloul – Nîmes Olympique, Metz – 1992–93, 1996–98
- Noureddine Kacemi – Istres – 2004–05
- **Ugo Kadmiri** – **Marseille** – 2025–
- Nordine Kandil – Strasbourg – 2021–23, 2024–25
- Ahmed Kantari – Brest, Lens – 2010–13, 2014–15
- Yassine Kechta – Le Havre – 2023–26
- Mohamed Khalfi – Alès – 1947–48
- Driss Khalid – Toulouse – 2017–18
- **Youssef Khoudda** – **Auxerre** – 2026–
- **Hamza Koutoune** – **Nice** – 2025–
- Krimau – Bastia, Lille, Strasbourg, Tours, Le Havre, Saint-Étienne, RC Paris – 1974–81, 1982–89

=== L ===
- Mohammed Lashaf – Gueugnon – 1995–96
- Imran Louza – Nantes, Lorient – 2018–21, 2023–24

=== M ===
- Ben Kaddour M'Barek – Bordeaux – 1946–47, 1949–52
- Karim M'Ghoghi – RC Strasbourg – 1996–98
- Hassan M'Jid – Sète, Nice – 1949–51, 1952–53
- Othmane Maamma – Montpellier – 2023–25
- Mohamed Maaroufi – Nîmes Olympique – 1971–72
- Abderrahmane Mahjoub – RC Paris, Nice, Montpellier – 1951–60, 1961–64
- Mohamed Mahjoub – Marseille – 1948–50
- Aïman Maurer – Clermont – 2022–24
- Belhadj Djilali Mehdi – Nîmes Olympique, Toulon – 1955–60
- Hamza Mendyl – Lille, Dijon – 2016–18, 2019–20
- Mehdi Messaoudi – Saint-Étienne – 2008–09
- Aïmen Moueffek – Saint-Étienne – 2020–22, 2024–25
- Lahcer Mounadi – Sochaux – 1990–91

=== N ===
- Bilal Nadir – Marseille – 2023–26
- Noureddine Naybet – Nantes – 1993–94

=== O ===
- Mounir Obbadi – Troyes, Monaco, Lille, Nice – 2012–14, 2015–17
- Abdeslam Ouaddou – Nancy, Rennes, Valenciennes – 1998–2000, 2003–05, 2006–10
- Azzedine Ounahi – Angers, Marseille – 2021–24

=== R ===
- Adrien Regattin – Toulouse – 2009–16
- Walid Regragui – Toulouse, Ajaccio, Grenoble – 2000–01, 2002–04, 2008–09
- **Amir Richardson** – Reims, **Le Havre** – 2023–24, 2026–
- Youssef Rossi – Rennes – 1997–99

=== S ===
- Mohamed Saghir – Troyes – 1954–56
- **Osame Sahraoui** – **Lille** – 2024–
- Romain Saïss – Angers – 2015–16
- Hamza Sakhi – Auxerre – 2022–23
- Ibrahim Salah – Rennes, Brest – 2022–26
- **Amine Sbaï** – **Angers** – 2025–
- Khalid Sekkat – Reims – 2012–13
- Tarik Sektioui – Auxerre – 1998–99
- Kacem Slimani – Paris FC – 1972–73
- Oussama Souaidy – Toulouse FC – 2000–01
- **Anis Soubeir** – **Monaco** – 2026–

=== T ===
- Farid Talhaoui – Guingamp, Lorient – 2001–04, 2006–07
- Oussama Tannane – Saint-Étienne – 2015–18
- Oussama Targhalline – Marseille, Le Havre – 2021–22, 2023–25
- Ahmed Tibari – RC Paris, Toulouse FC (1937) – 1957–60, 1961–62
- Smahi Triki – Lorient – 1998–99

=== Y ===
- **Gessime Yassine** – **Strasbourg** – 2025–

=== Z ===
- Yassir Zabiri – Rennes – 2025–26
- Brahim Zahar – RC Paris, Bordeaux – 1956–58, 1961–63
- Jaouad Zairi – Sochaux, Nantes – 2001–05, 2006–07
- Anass Zaroury – Lens – 2024–25
- Moncef Zerka – AS Nancy – 2005–09

== Mozambique ==
- Reinildo Mandava – Lille – 2018–22
- Mexer – Rennes, Bordeaux – 2014–22

== References and notes ==
=== Books ===
- Barreaud, Marc (1998). Dictionnaire des footballeurs étrangers du championnat professionnel français (1932-1997). L'Harmattan, Paris. ISBN 2-7384-6608-7.
- Tamás Dénes; Pál Peterdi; Zoltán Rochy; József Selmeci (1999). Kalandozó magyar labdarúgók. ISBN 963-85967-0-8.

=== Club pages ===
- AJ Auxerre former players
- AJ Auxerre former players
- Girondins de Bordeaux former players
- Girondins de Bordeaux former players
- Les ex-Tangos (joueurs), Stade Lavallois former players
- Olympique Lyonnais former players
- Olympique de Marseille former players
- FC Metz former players
- AS Monaco FC former players
- Ils ont porté les couleurs de la Paillade... Montpellier HSC Former players
- AS Nancy former players
- FC Nantes former players
- Paris SG former players
- Red Star Former players
- Red Star former players
- Stade de Reims former players
- Stade Rennais former players
- CO Roubaix-Tourcoing former players
- AS Saint-Étienne former players
- Sporting Toulon Var former players

=== Others ===
- stat2foot
- footballenfrance
- French Clubs' Players in European Cups 1955-1995, RSSSF
- Finnish players abroad, RSSSF
- Italian players abroad, RSSSF
- Romanians who played in foreign championships
- Swiss players in France, RSSSF
- EURO 2008 CONNECTIONS: FRANCE, Stephen Byrne Bristol Rovers official site

=== Notes ===
1. Born in Belgium
2. Born in the Comoros
3. Born in France
4. Born in Greece
5. Born in Ivory Coast
6. Born in the Netherlands
7. Born in New Caledonia (Overseas territory of the French Republic)
8. Born in Norway
9. Born in Réunion (Overseas territory of the French Republic)
10. Born Senegal
11. Born in Serbia (then SFR Yugoslavia)
12. Born Spain
13. Capped for the France national football team
14. Capped for the France national football B team
15. Capped for the France Olympic football team
16. Capped for the France national under-16 football team
17. Capped for the France national under-17 football team
18. Capped for the France national under-18 football team
19. Capped for the France national under-19 football team
20. Capped for the France national under-20 football team
21. Capped for the France national under-21 football team
22. Capped for the Netherlands national under-17 football team
23. Capped for the Netherlands national under-18 football team
24. Capped for the Netherlands national under-19 football team
25. Capped for the Netherlands national under-20 football team
26. Capped for the Netherlands national under-21 football team
27. Capped for the Norway national football team
28. Capped for the Norway national under-21 football team
29. Capped for the Portugal national under-20 football team
30. Capped for the Portugal national under-21 football team
31. Capped for the Portugal national under-23 football team
