= 1956–57 French Division 1 =

19th season of French Division 1

Division Nationale
- Season: 1956–57
- Champions: Saint-Étienne
- Relegated: Stade Rennais; Strasbourg; Nancy
- European Cup: Saint-Étienne

AS Saint-Etienne won Division 1 season 1956/1957 of the Professional Football League with 49 points.

== Participating teams ==
- Angers SCO
- RC Lens
- Olympique Lyonnais
- Olympique de Marseille
- FC Metz
- AS Monaco
- FC Nancy
- OGC Nice
- Nîmes Olympique
- RC Paris
- Stade de Reims
- Stade Rennais UC
- AS Saint-Etienne
- UA Sedan-Torcy
- FC Sochaux-Montbéliard
- RC Strasbourg
- Toulouse FC
- US Valenciennes-Anzin
Location of teams in 1956–57 Division 1

== Final table ==
Pos	Team	Pld	W	D	L	GF	GA	GAv	Pts	Qualification or relegation
1	Saint-Étienne (C)	34	20	9	5	88	45	1.956	49	Qualification to European Cup preliminary round
2	Lens	34	21	3	10	77	49	1.571	45	
3	Reims	34	18	7	9	73	47	1.553	43	
4	Racing Paris	34	17	8	9	86	55	1.564	42	
5	Monaco	34	17	6	11	57	44	1.295	40	
6	Marseille	34	16	7	11	60	53	1.132	39	
7	Sochaux	34	14	5	15	63	62	1.016	33	
8	Toulouse	34	12	8	14	61	49	1.245	32	
9	Sedan	34	9	14	11	51	59	0.864	32	
10	Nîmes	34	13	5	16	52	56	0.929	31	
11	Angers	34	10	11	13	42	51	0.824	31	
12	Lyon	34	13	4	17	45	53	0.849	30	
13	Nice	34	11	8	15	59	72	0.819	30	
14	Valenciennes	34	10	9	15	43	72	0.597	29	
15	Metz	34	9	10	15	51	58	0.879	28	
16	Rennes (R)	34	11	5	18	36	63	0.571	27	Qualification to relegation play-offs
17	Strasbourg (R)	34	9	8	17	43	66	0.652	26	Relegation to French Division 2
18	Nancy (R)	34	8	9	17	43	76	0.566	25	Relegation to French Division 2

Rules for classification: Victory: 2 points, Draw: 1 point, Defeat: 0 points
(C) Champions; (R) Relegated

Promoted from Division 2, who will play in Division 1 season 1957/1958

- Olympique Alès: Champion of Division 2
- AS Béziers: runner-up
- Lille OSC: Third place

== Results ==
Home \ Away	ANG	RCL	OL	OM	MET	ASM	FCN	NIC	NMS	RCP	REI	REN	STE	SED	SOC	RCS	TOU	VAL
Angers		1–0	0–2	2–2	0–3	0–2	3–0	0–1	1–1	1–1	2–2	2–0	0–1	0–0	4–0	4–1	2–5	2–0
Lens	0–3		3–1	2–0	3–1	3–1	3–1	6–1	4–0	2–0	2–1	3–0	0–2	1–0	3–1	0–2	4–1	0–0
Lyon	2–1	3–0		2–0	1–0	1–0	0–1	1–0	4–1	1–2	0–3	2–0	1–3	1–1	0–1	3–1	1–3	1–0
Marseille	0–0	1–4	3–2		3–3	2–0	3–1	3–1	3–1	0–3	1–2	1–0	4–3	3–0	2–3	3–1	3–0	4–1
Metz	0–1	1–5	3–1	1–0		1–2	1–1	3–3	3–1	2–2	2–5	1–1	1–2	3–1	1–3	2–0	4–1	2–2
Monaco	1–1	1–2	2–0	1–0	2–1		0–2	2–1	4–1	1–1	1–1	4–0	3–1	2–1	2–1	1–2	1–1	6–0
Nancy	2–2	0–2	0–2	0–1	0–2	0–2		4–2	1–0	2–5	0–0	4–0	1–7	3–2	1–3	3–3	1–1	1–4
Nice	1–1	3–2	1–0	1–3	1–1	0–2	3–2		5–2	1–1	2–1	0–2	2–2	1–0	4–2	1–0	1–0	2–2
Nîmes	3–1	2–3	2–0	2–0	1–1	3–1	4–0	3–2		4–2	1–2	2–1	0–0	2–1	3–0	4–1	0–1	2–3
Racing Paris	6–2	5–0	1–2	1–3	4–1	2–1	6–1	3–2	0–0		4–2	3–0	1–2	1–2	3–1	2–0	6–2	3–1
Reims	1–2	3–2	4–1	1–1	2–1	5–1	4–1	3–1	2–0	2–4		3–1	4–5	0–1	1–0	3–1	2–0	1–1
Rennes	4–1	1–4	2–1	1–1	1–0	0–1	0–3	2–3	2–1	2–2	1–1		1–0	2–0	2–0	2–1	1–0	3–0
Saint-Étienne	3–0	3–1	3–2	6–3	2–0	0–1	6–1	4–2	4–0	3–1	0–0	2–0		2–2	6–0	2–2	0–0	5–4
Sedan	1–1	4–4	2–2	1–1	3–2	3–3	1–1	3–3	1–0	1–1	0–4	1–1	2–6		1–0	3–1	1–1	3–0
Sochaux	0–0	2–2	3–1	3–0	1–1	1–1	3–1	4–2	3–1	3–5	2–0	3–1	1–1	5–2		6–0	1–3	4–0
Strasbourg	0–2	1–4	2–0	2–3	1–0	2–4	0–0	2–2	0–4	2–1	1–3	2–0	1–1	0–0	3–2		0–0	6–0
Toulouse FC	5–0	1–2	2–2	0–1	1–2	3–0	1–2	4–3	0–1	3–3	4–0	6–0	3–0	2–3	2–0	1–1		4–0
Valenciennes	1–0	2–1	1–2	2–2	1–1	2–1	0–0	2–1	0–0	3–1	1–5	5–2	1–1	0–4	3–1	0–1	1–0	

Legend: Blue = home team win; Yellow = draw; Red = away team win.

== Relegation play-offs ==
Team 1	Series	Team 2	Game 1	Game 2	Game 3
Lille	5–4	Rennes	0–2	3–1	2–1

== Top goalscorers ==
Rank	Player	Club	Goals
1	(France) (Poland) Thadée Cisowski	Racing Paris	33
2	(France) Just Fontaine	Reims	30
3	(Sweden) Egon Johnsson	Lens	29
3	(France) Eugène Njo-Léa	Saint-Étienne	29
5	(France) Rachid Mekloufi	Saint-Étienne	25
6	(Sweden) Gunnar Andersson	Marseille	23
7	(Morocco) Hassan Akesbi	Nîmes	20
8	(France) Maryan Wisniewski	Lens	17
8	(France) Pierre Grillet	Racing Paris	17
8	(France) René Gardien	Sochaux	17

== Attendances ==
#	Club	Average
1	Racing	19,186
2	Saint-Étienne	16,541
3	Marseille	16,186
4	Valenciennes	11,197
5	Stade rennais	11,085
6	Nice	11,022
7	Lens	10,923
8	Olympique lyonnais	10,778
9	Toulouse	9,461
10	Strasbourg	9,028
11	Angers	9,020
12	Nîmes	8,144
13	Reims	7,115
14	Metz	7,063
15	Nancy	6,883
16	Sedan	6,519
17	Sochaux	6,305
18	Monaco	3,787
