= 1947 Coupe de France final =

French Football Match, Finals

- Event: 1946–47 Coupe de France
| Lille | Strasbourg |
| 2 | 0 |
- Date: 11 May 1947
- Venue: Olympique Yves-du-Manoir, Colombes
- Referee: René Tranchon
- Attendance: 59,852

The 1947 Coupe de France final was a football match held at Stade Olympique Yves-du-Manoir, Colombes on May 11, 1947, that saw Lille OSC defeat RC Strasbourg 2–0 thanks to a goal by Roger Vandooren and an own goal of Joseph Lang.

== Match details ==
11 May 1947

| Lille | 2–0 | Strasbourg |
|---|---|---|
| Vandooren 1'; Lang 66' |

Stade Olympique Yves-du-Manoir, Colombes
Attendance: 59,852
Referee: René Tranchon

| GK | (France) Robert Germain |
| DF | (France) Joseph Jadrejak |
| DF | (France) Marceau Sommerlynck |
| DF | (France) Albert Dubreucq |
| DF | (France) Jean-Marie Prevost |
| MF | (France) Jules Bigot | (c) |
| MF | (France) Roger Vandooren |
| FW | (France) (Poland) Bolek Tempowski |
| FW | (France) Jean Baratte |
| FW | (France) Roger Carré |
| FW | (France) Jean Lechantre |
Manager:
(France) André Cheuva Assistant Referees: Fourth Official:

| GK | (France) Marcel Lergenmuller |
| DF | (France) (Spain) Segundo Pascual |
| DF | (France) Gabriel Braun |
| DF | (France) Charles Heine |
| DF | (France) (Spain) Francisco Mateo "Paco" |
| MF | (France) Joseph Lang |
| MF | (France) Joseph Heckel |
| FW | (France) Oscar Heisserer | (c) |
| FW | (France) Frédéric Woehl |
| FW | (Soviet Union) Alexandre Vanags |
| FW | (France) Alphonse Rolland |
Manager:
(France) Émile Veinante

== See also ==
- 1946–47 Coupe de France
