= Bernard Lefèvre =

French footballer (1930–2019)

Personal information
- Full name: Bernard Jean André Lefevre
- Date of birth: 22 June 1930
- Place of birth: Origny-en-Thiérache, France
- Date of death: 16 December 2019 (aged 89)
- Place of death: Reims, France
- Height: 1.71 m (5 ft 7 in)
- Position: Left winger

Senior career*
Years	Team	Apps	(Gls)
1949–1956	Lille		
1956–1958	Saint-Étienne		
1958–1960	FC Nancy		
1960–1962	Marseille		
1962–1964	Lille		

International career
- France
- * Club domestic league appearances and goals

Bernard Jean André Lefevre (22 June 1930 – 16 December 2019) was a French footballer. A left winger, his career lasted from 1949 to 1964, over which time he played in more than 400 matches and scored 143 goals. He played for Lille, Saint-Étienne, FC Nancy and Marseille.

He played on two Ligue 1 champions, in 1954 with Lille and 1957 with Saint-Étienne. In 1953, he lifted the Coupe de France with Lille.

He was member of the French squad in the men's tournament at the 1952 Summer Olympics.

Lefèvre died in Reims at the age of 89 on 16 December 2019.
