= Adam Shaiek =

French footballer (born 1989)

Adam Shaïek
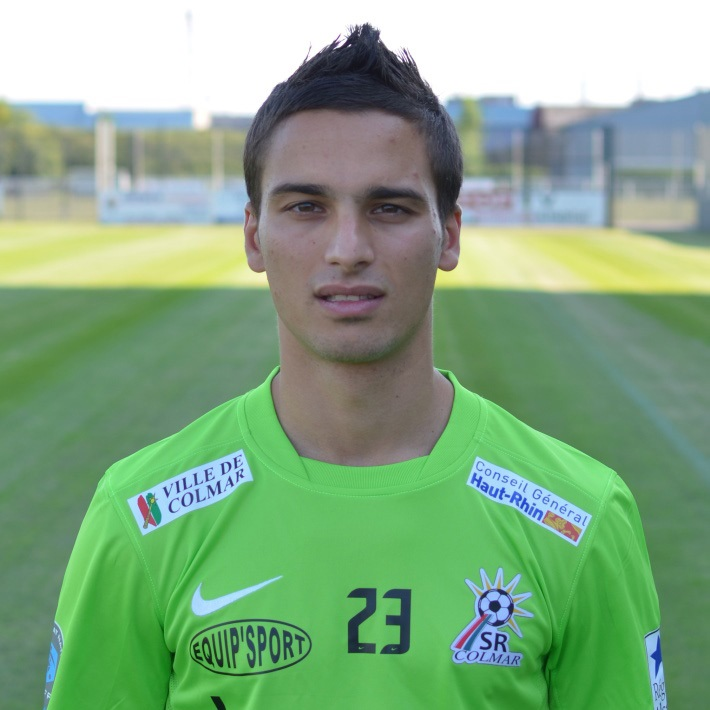

Personal information
- Full name: Adam Shaïek
- Date of birth: 6 April 1989 (age 37)
- Place of birth: Champigny-sur-Marne, France
- Height: 1.64 m (5 ft 4 1/2 in)
- Position: Midfielder

Team information
- Current team: SR Colmar

Youth career
- 2001–2007: Villepinte FC
- 2007–2008: Troyes AC

Senior career*
Years	Team	Apps	(Gls)
2008–2010	Troyes B	6	(0)
2008–2010	Troyes AC	1	(0)
2010–	SR Colmar	7	(0)
- * Club domestic league appearances and goals

Adam Shaïek (born 6 April 1989) is a French professional football player, who currently plays in the Championnat National for SR Colmar.

== Career ==
He played on the professional level in Ligue 2 for Troyes AC and played his debut on 10 October 2008 against AC Ajaccio. He left after on 31 May 2010 ES Troyes AC and signed for SR Colmar.
