= Charles Heiné =

French footballer (1920–1971)

Personal information
- Date of birth: 2 January 1920
- Place of birth: Colmar, France
- Date of death: 10 July 1971 (aged 51)
- Height: 1.72 m (5 ft 8 in)
- Position: Midfielder

Senior career*
Years	Team	Apps	(Gls)
1938–1939	SR Colmar		
1945–1946	SR Colmar		
1946–1949	Strasbourg	85	(19)
1949–1952	Sochaux	59	(5)

International career
1947	France	2	(0)
- * Club domestic league appearances and goals

Charles Heiné (2 January 1920 – 10 July 1971) was a French footballer who played as a midfielder. He played twice for the France national team during the 1946–47 season under Gaston Barreau and Gabriel Hanot.

== Career ==
Born in Colmar, Heiné began his career at local side SR Colmar, playing in Division 2. He went on play for Racing Club de Strasbourg Alsace and FC Sochaux-Montbéliard. At Strasbourg, he appeared in the 1947 Coupe de France final against Lille OSC which Strasbourg lost 2–0. He made 100 Division 1 appearances scoring 11 goals.

He made two appearances for the France, on 1 June 1947 in a 4–2 win against Belgium and one week later, in a 1–2 win away to Switzerland.

== Honours ==
Strasbourg

- Coupe de France runner-up: 1947
