= Stade des Francs =

Football stadium in Colmar, France

- Interactive map of Stade des Francs
- Former names: Stade Joseph Lehmann; Frankenweg Stadion
- Coordinates: 48.082°N 7.366°E
- Capacity: 2,000

Construction
- Built: 24 June 1928

Tenants
- SR Colmar (1928–2000)

The Stade des Francs was a football stadium in Colmar, France. It was the home of SR Colmar until 2000.

== History ==
The stadium hosted the home games of SR Colmar starting on 24 June 1928, the date of inauguration of the ground. This formerly fallow land had been leased by the club in 1926. The stadium emerged after more than a year of renovations carried out mainly by members of the Colmar sports club.

The record attendance at the stadium is of 11,990 spectators, recorded during a match against Strasbourg during the 1948–49 Division 1, Colmar's only season in the first tier of French football.

The stadium was named for a time the "Stade Joseph Lehmann" in memory of the former president of the club. The funeral of Joseph Lehmann happened on the lawn of the stadium 17 May 1949. During the Second World War and the annexation to Germany, the stadium was renamed "Frankenweg Stadion."

During the 2000s, a new stadium was built in the northeast of the city: the Colmar Stadium. It is now the main stadium of the city of Colmar and hosts the team matches of SR Colmar as well as many gala matches organized by the club.
