= Monceau-le-Neuf-et-Faucouzy =

- Commune
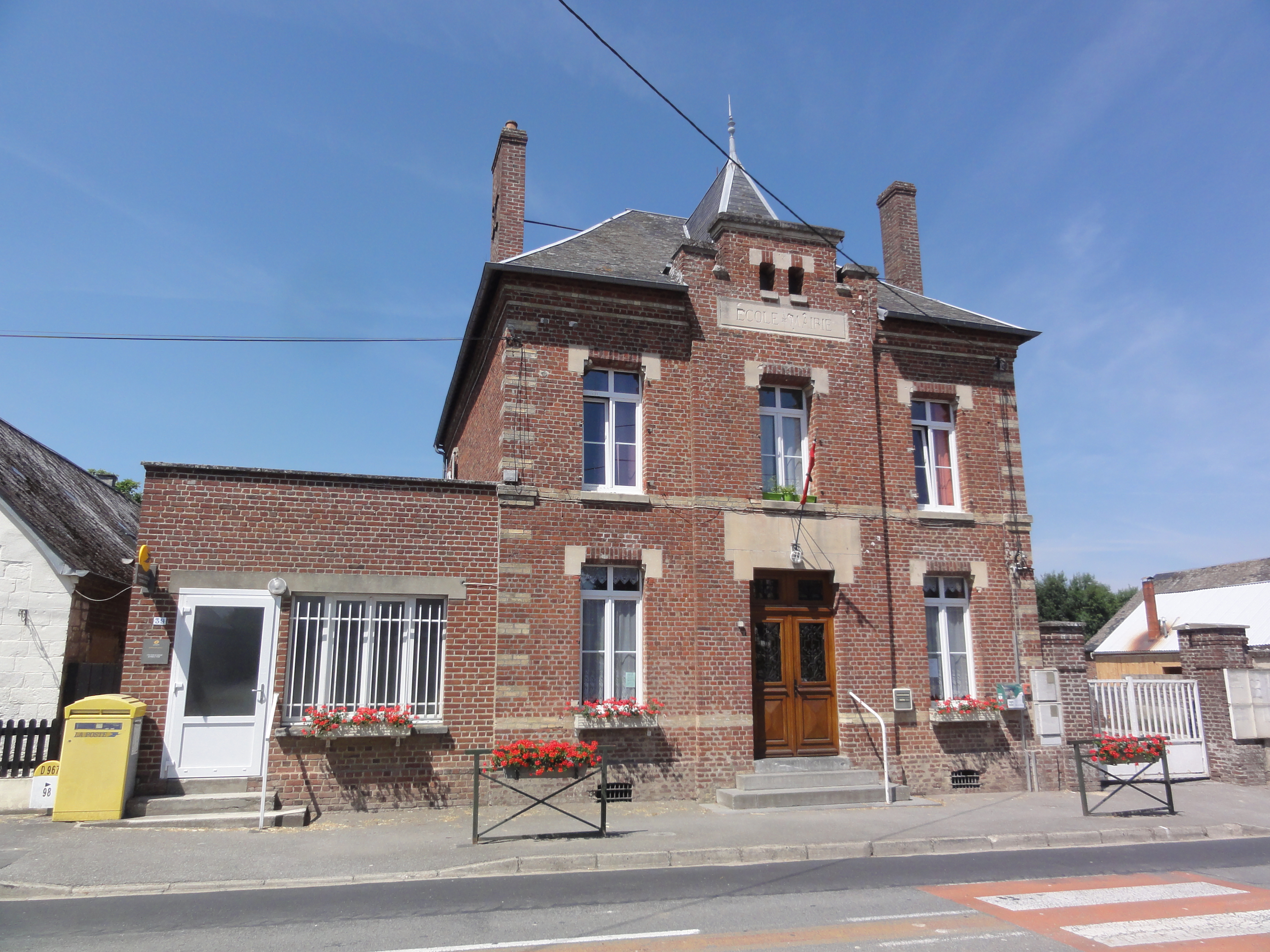
- The town hall and school of Monceau-le-Neuf-et-Faucouzy
- Location of Monceau-le-Neuf-et-Faucouzy
- Location within France Location within Hauts-de-France
- Coordinates: 49°46′14″N 3°37′00″E
- Country: France
- Region: Hauts-de-France
- Department: Aisne
- Arrondissement: Vervins
- Canton: Marle
- Intercommunality: Thiérache du Centre

Government
  - Mayor (2026–32): Frédéric Aubert
- Area^{1}: 19.72 km^{2} (7.61 sq mi)
- Elevation: 70 m (230 ft)
- Highest elevation: 142 m (466 ft)
- Lowest elevation: 66 m (217 ft)
- Population (2023): 320
  - Density: 16/km^{2} (42/sq mi)
- Time zone: UTC+01:00 (CET)
  - Summer (DST): UTC+02:00 (CEST)
- INSEE/Postal code: 02491 /02270
- ^{1} French Land Register data, which excludes lakes, ponds, glaciers > 1 km^{2} (0.386 sq mi or 247 acres) and river estuaries.

Monceau-le-Neuf-et-Faucouzy (French pronunciation: [mɔ̃so lə nœf e fokuzi]) is a commune in the Aisne département in Hauts-de-France in northern France.

== Population ==
Historical population
Year	Pop.	±% p.a.
1968	459	—
1975	418	−1.33%
1982	370	−1.73%
1990	348	−0.76%
1999	330	−0.59%
2007	338	+0.30%
2012	338	+0.00%
2017	319	−1.15%
2023	320	+0.05%
Source: INSEE

== Personalities linked to the commune ==
- Edmond Biernat: footballer and accordionist, born 1939 in Monceau-le-Neuf

== See also ==
- Communes of the Aisne department
