= Edmond Biernat =

French footballer (born 1939)

Edmond Biernat (born 27 March 1939) is a French former professional footballer who played as a forward. (Note: Edmond Biernat at WorldFootball.net)

== Career ==
On 13 October 1957, 18-year-old Biernat scored the decisive goal in Reims's 1–0 win against Lens. Decimated by the Asian flu, Reims fielded five amateur players in the starting lineup. The win helped Reims reach the top of French Division 1 table and the club went on to win the league that season.

- 1957–1960: Reims
- 1960–1963: FC Nancy
- 1963–1966: Strasbourg
- 1966–1967: Stade Français

== Honours ==
Reims

- French Division 1: 1957–58, 1959–60
