= Francisco Mateo =

Spanish-French footballer (1917–1979)

Paco Mateo
Personal information
- Date of birth: 15 May 1917
- Place of birth: Algeciras, Spain
- Date of death: 21 July 1979 (aged 62)
- Place of death: Strasbourg, France
- Position: Defender

Youth career
- FC Tétouan
- Sevilla
- Barcelona

Senior career*
Years	Team	Apps	(Gls)
1937–1939	Valencia		
1939–1945	Bordeaux		
1945–1950	Strasbourg	118	(17)

Managerial career
- 1951–1952: La Walck
- 1952–1956: Bischwiller
- 1957–1961: Mutzig
- 1962–1970: Pierrots Strasbourg
- 1970–1971: Strasbourg
- 1977–1979: Vauban Strasbourg
- * Club domestic league appearances and goals

Francisco Mateo (15 May 1917 – 21 July 1979) was a Spanish-French football defender who played as a professional for Valencia, Bordeaux and Strasbourg. He also was a coach and manager for RC Strasbourg.

== Bio ==
Mateo was born in Algeciras. He started his career as a promising youngster playing for a Spanish club in Tétouan, Morocco and quickly attracted the attention of the biggest clubs in the Spanish mainland, joining Sevilla FC and then FC Barcelona before the outbreak of the Spanish Civil War. Mateo chose the Republican side, spending most of the war in Valencia. Towards the end of the conflict, he was imprisoned due to his political leanings but was released on the insistence of the Girondins de Bordeaux and was therefore able to emigrate to France shortly before the outbreak of World War II.

In Bordeaux, Mateo played for the Girondins in a local league as the French Championship had been disbanded due to the war. He also met his wife, an Alsatian who had been evacuated to south-west France in 1939. When the war was terminated, he accompanied his wife back to Alsace and quickly joined RC Strasbourg where he played until the end of the decade, reaching the final of the cup in 1947.

After the end of his playing career, Mateo continued as a youth coach for RC Strasbourg where he taught the likes of Gilbert Gress, Gérard Hausser, Albert Gemmrich or Léonard Specht. He was responsible for the first team between October 1970 and June 1971 but was not able to save Strasbourg from relegation. He died in 1979, shortly after Strasbourg's first and only championship crown.
