= 1957–58 French Division 2 =

19th season of the second-tier football league in France

Division 2
- Season: 1957–58

Statistics of Division 2 in the 1957–58 season.

== Overview ==
It was contested by 22 teams, and Nancy won the championship.

== League standings ==
Pos	Team	Pld	W	D	L	GF	GA	GD	Pts	Promotion or relegation
1	Nancy	42	25	11	6	89	50	+39	61	Promoted
2	Stade Rennais	42	23	12	7	93	40	+53	58	Promoted
3	Limoges	42	25	5	12	85	41	+44	55	Promoted
4	RC Strasbourg	42	22	10	10	89	52	+37	54	Promoted
5	Girondins Bordeaux	42	25	3	14	82	53	+29	53	
6	Forbach	42	22	9	11	60	51	+9	53	
7	Le Havre	42	19	11	12	65	50	+15	49	
8	AS Troyes	42	20	9	13	51	42	+9	49	
9	Rouen	42	19	10	13	66	51	+15	48	
10	Roubaix-Tourcoing	42	19	9	14	75	68	+7	47	
11	Toulon	42	18	6	18	71	71	0	42	
12	Red Star Paris	42	15	12	15	60	60	0	42	
13	Nantes	42	13	11	18	53	65	−12	37	
14	Perpignan	42	15	7	20	42	57	−15	37	
15	Cannes	42	13	10	19	60	79	−19	36	
16	Stade Français	42	13	7	22	48	75	−27	33	
17	Montpellier	42	12	7	23	48	75	−27	31	
18	CA Paris	42	10	10	22	49	80	−31	30	
19	Grenoble	42	7	15	20	53	74	−21	29	
20	Aix-en-Provence	42	7	13	22	53	90	−37	27	
21	Sète	42	7	13	22	47	81	−34	27	
22	Besançon	42	9	8	25	49	83	−34	26	

Source: rsssf.com
