= 1956–57 French Division 2 =

18th season of the second-tier football league in France

Division 2
- Season: 1956–57

Statistics of Division 2 in the 1956–57 season.

== Overview ==
It was contested by 20 teams, and Olympique Alès won the championship.

== League standings ==
Pos	Team	Pld	W	D	L	GF	GA	GD	Pts	Promotion or relegation
1	Olympique Alès	38	24	8	6	58	36	+22	56	Promoted
2	Béziers	38	20	13	5	58	38	+20	53	Promoted
3	Lille	38	21	10	7	99	51	+48	52	Promoted
4	AS Troyes	38	17	11	10	71	46	+25	45	
5	Girondins Bordeaux	38	15	13	10	67	48	+19	43	
6	Grenoble	38	16	9	13	63	49	+14	41	
7	Toulon	38	18	5	15	70	56	+14	41	
8	Le Havre	38	15	11	12	62	55	+7	41	
9	Rouen	38	16	8	14	64	48	+16	40	
10	Stade Français	38	14	11	13	53	51	+2	39	
11	Montpellier	38	16	6	16	56	71	−15	38	
12	Sète	38	14	9	15	47	53	−6	37	
13	Nantes	38	13	10	15	56	64	−8	36	
14	Perpignan	38	12	12	14	35	44	−9	36	
15	Roubaix-Tourcoing	38	14	4	20	49	55	−6	32	
16	Besançon	38	13	6	19	46	60	−14	32	
17	Aix-en-Provence	37	12	5	20	41	58	−17	29	
18	Cannes	38	7	13	18	39	60	−21	27	
19	CA Paris	38	6	11	21	41	82	−41	23	
20	Red Star Paris	38	7	7	24	42	88	−46	21	

Source: rsssf.com
