= Roger Vandooren =

French footballer (1923–1998)

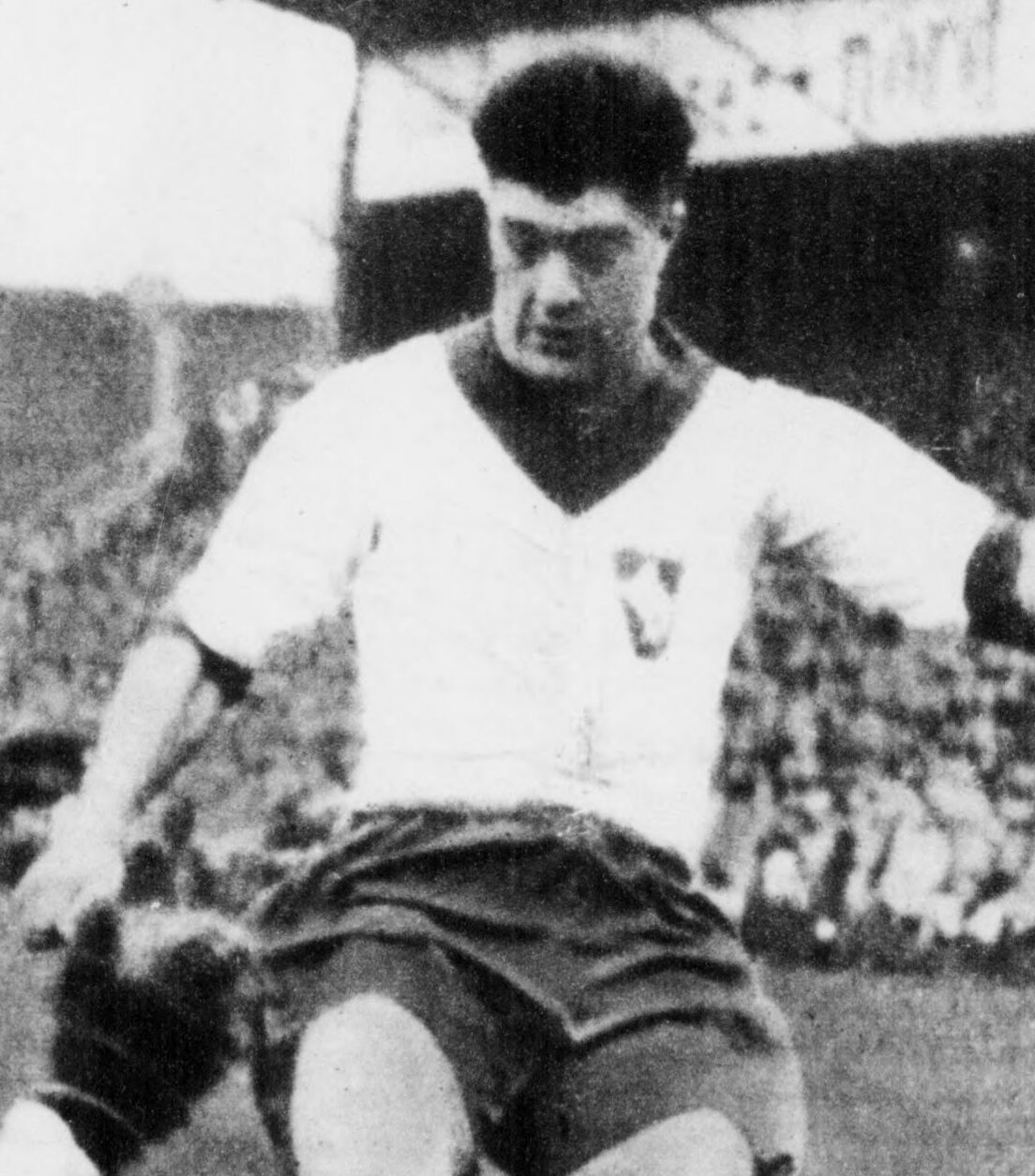
- Vandooren in 1946

Personal information
- Full name: Roger Auguste Vandooren
- Date of birth: 27 April 1923
- Place of birth: Choisy-le-Roi, France
- Date of death: 31 March 1998 (aged 74)
- Place of death: Carpentras, France
- Height: 1.71 m (5 ft 7 in)
- Position: Winger

Senior career*
Years	Team	Apps	(Gls)
–1943	Choisy-le-Roi		
1943–1944	EF Paris-Île-de-France		
1944–1950	Lille	137	(47)
1950–1951	Roubaix-Tourcoing	25	(6)
1951–1953	Stade Français	64	(26)
1953	Angers	17	(7)
1953–1954	Monaco	16	(2)
1954–1955	Olympique Marseille	26	(3)
1955–1956	Le Havre	31	(3)
1956–1957	Red Star	32	(1)
1957–1959	Olympique Avignonnais		

International career
1949–1951	France	4	(0)

Managerial career
- 1960–1965: Olympique Avignonnais
- * Club domestic league appearances and goals

Roger Auguste Vandooren (27 April 1923 – 31 March 1998) was a French footballer who played as a winger.

== Career ==
In 1947, Vandooren scored the fastest ever goal in a Coupe de France final, scoring in 29 seconds against Strasbourg. He played four matches for the France national team, including twice in 1950 FIFA World Cup qualification against Yugoslavia.

Between 1960 and 1965, he was the manager of Olympique Avignonnais.

== Personal life ==
His brother, Jules Vandooren, was also a footballer.

== Honours ==
Lille

- French Division 1: 1945–46
- Coupe de France: 1945–46, 1946–47, 1947–48; runners-up: 1944–45, 1948–49

Stade Français

- French Division 2: 1951–52
