= Abdelsalem Ben Miloud Salem =

Moroccan footballer (born 1921)

Personal information
- Date of birth: 1 January 1921
- Place of birth: Mazagan, French Morocco
- Date of death: Unknown
- Height: 1.82 m (6 ft 0 in)
- Position: Defender

Senior career*
Years	Team	Apps	(Gls)
–1946	Wydad AC		
1946–1956	Marseille	256	(2)
1956–1957	Thiers		
- * Club domestic league appearances and goals

Abdelsalem Ben Miloud Salem (Arabic: عبد السلام بن ميلود سالم; 1 January 1921 – unknown) was a Moroccan professional footballer who played as a defender. He spent the majority of his career at Marseille.

== Honours ==
Marseille

- Division 1: 1947–48
- Coupe de France runner-up: 1953–54
