= 1945–46 French Division 1 =

8th season of French Division 1

Division Nationale
- Season: 1945–46
- Champions: Lille; 1st title
- Relegated: Lyon; Sochaux
- Matches: 306
- Goals: 1,080 (3.53 per match)
- Top goalscorer: René Bihel (28)

The 1945–46 French Division 1, the first professional football season since the end of World War II, was won by Lille OSC.

== Participating teams ==
- Bordeaux
- AS Cannes
- Le Havre AC
- RC Lens
- Lille OSC
- Lyon OU
- Olympique de Marseille
- FC Metz
- RC Paris
- Red Star Olympique
- Stade de Reims
- Stade Rennais UC
- CO Roubaix-Tourcoing
- FC Rouen
- AS Saint-Étienne
- FC Sète
- FC Sochaux-Montbéliard
- RC Strasbourg
Location of teams in 1945–46 Division 1

== Final table ==
Pos	Team	Pld	W	D	L	GF	GA	GAv	Pts	Qualification or relegation
1	Lille (C)	34	19	7	8	89	44	2.023	45	
2	Saint-Étienne	34	20	4	10	86	68	1.265	44	
3	Roubaix-Tourcoing	34	15	11	8	60	38	1.579	41	
4	Reims	34	15	10	9	68	48	1.417	40	
5	Rennes	34	13	11	10	57	52	1.096	37	
6	Lens	34	14	8	12	72	57	1.263	36	
7	Rouen	34	14	8	12	53	47	1.128	36	
8	Racing Paris	34	16	3	15	56	52	1.077	35	
9	Marseille	34	12	10	12	70	65	1.077	34	
10	Cannes	34	12	10	12	51	55	0.927	34	
11	Red Star	34	12	9	13	62	59	1.051	33	
12	Strasbourg	34	13	7	14	53	62	0.855	33	
13	Sète	34	13	6	15	63	65	0.969	32	
14	Bordeaux	34	11	9	14	65	66	0.985	31	
15	Lyon OU (R)	34	11	9	14	52	78	0.667	31	Relegation to French Division 2
16	Le Havre	34	13	4	17	48	68	0.706	30	Spared from relegation (Note: Le Havre and Metz were spared from relegation as the clubs suffered massive damages from World War II, thus Lyon OU were relegated instead. This reprieve also applied to Strasbourg, however the club finished outside of the relegation zone.)
17	Metz	34	10	5	19	40	77	0.519	25	Spared from relegation
18	Sochaux (R)	34	4	7	23	35	79	0.443	15	Relegation to French Division 2

Rules for classification: Victory: 2 points, Draw: 1 point, Defeat: 0 points
(C) Champions; (R) Relegated
Notes:

Promoted from Division 2, who will play in Division 1 season 1946/1947

- FC Nancy: Champion of Division 2, north group
- SO Montpellier: Champion of Division 2, south group
- Stade Français FC: Runner-up Division 2, north group
- Toulouse FC: Runner-up Division 2, south group

== Results ==
Home \ Away	BOR	CAN	LHA	RCL	LIL	LOU	OM	FCM	RCP	RSO	REI	REN	CRT	ROU	STE	SÉT	SOC	RCS
Bordeaux		4–1	1–2	2–2	1–5	0–1	1–1	8–0	3–1	2–1	5–1	4–1	0–2	4–1	1–3	0–3	3–2	4–3
Cannes	0–0		3–2	1–0	2–1	1–1	0–2	0–1	1–1	3–1	1–1	2–2	1–1	3–1	1–4	2–1	4–1	3–1
Le Havre	3–2	1–2		1–0	1–2	0–0	4–3	3–0	3–5	0–1	2–3	0–0	4–1	1–0	0–2	4–1	1–0	3–0
Lens	1–1	2–1	7–1		3–1	9–2	3–1	5–3	2–3	1–1	2–2	2–2	2–1	1–0	6–1	5–1	3–0	0–4
Lille	5–0	5–1	1–0	3–1		4–0	4–4	7–0	0–1	3–1	3–0	2–5	0–2	2–2	8–0	5–2	3–1	4–1
Lyon OU	0–0	2–2	1–0	2–0	1–2		1–1	2–0	1–0	2–2	1–2	3–5	0–5	2–1	3–3	2–0	3–4	3–2
Marseille	3–0	6–1	3–0	4–1	2–2	1–1		2–1	0–0	2–1	3–5	2–2	0–2	2–3	1–4	1–2	3–1	5–0
Metz	2–0	1–0	2–2	2–3	0–3	1–4	3–1		2–1	2–4	2–2	0–1	4–2	0–0	0–3	2–1	2–0	1–3
Racing Paris	2–2	0–3	4–1	2–0	2–1	1–3	2–6	2–0		1–0	2–1	3–0	0–2	0–1	4–1	4–1	3–0	2–1
Red Star Olympique	4–2	1–1	3–0	1–1	2–2	2–2	2–2	2–3	0–1		0–3	0–4	3–0	3–1	3–2	6–0	4–1	4–2
Reims	2–2	2–4	4–0	1–2	1–1	6–0	4–1	1–1	1–0	4–0		5–0	1–1	4–1	1–3	2–1	1–0	0–1
Rennes	4–2	0–2	0–1	3–0	1–4	3–1	0–0	1–0	1–0	1–0	1–1		1–1	2–0	2–3	3–3	5–1	0–1
Roubaix-Tourcoing	3–1	2–0	1–1	3–0	1–1	5–0	1–1	4–0	1–0	3–5	0–1	1–1		0–0	3–2	3–1	2–2	1–1
Rouen	1–1	1–1	6–0	2–1	2–1	2–1	6–0	4–1	2–0	1–1	1–0	1–1	2–1		2–1	0–3	1–1	5–0
Saint-Étienne	3–1	2–1	5–1	2–1	3–1	4–0	2–4	3–1	3–2	3–2	2–3	4–2	1–3	3–1		6–2	1–0	0–0
Sète	2–4	1–0	3–0	0–0	1–2	6–2	2–3	3–1	3–2	4–0	1–1	2–0	0–0	4–1	1–1		4–0	0–1
Sochaux	0–3	2–2	2–4	0–3	0–0	1–3	1–0	0–0	2–4	0–2	1–1	0–2	0–1	2–0	4–4	1–3		4–2
Strasbourg	1–1	3–2	0–2	3–3	0–1	3–2	3–0	0–2	4–1	1–1	3–1	1–1	2–1	1–1	3–2	1–1	2–1	

Legend: Blue = home team win; Yellow = draw; Red = away team win.

== Top goalscorers ==
Rank	Player	Club	Goals
1	(France) René Bihel	Lille	28
2	(France) Pierre Sinibaldi	Reims	26
3	(France) Antoine Rodriguez	Saint-Étienne	22
4	(France) Louis de Sainte de Maréville	Marseille	21
5	(France) (Hungary) Désiré Koranyi	Sète	20
6	(France) Jean Baratte	Lille	19
7	(France) René Alpsteg	Saint-Étienne	18
7	(France) (Poland) Stefan Dembicki	Lens	18
7	(France) René Lozia	Red Star	18
7	(France) Joseph Rabstejnek	Rennes	18
