= 1947–48 French Division 1 =

10th season of French Division 1

Division Nationale
- Season: 1947–48
- Champions: Marseille; 2nd title
- Relegated: Olympique Alès; Red Star
- Matches: 306
- Goals: 1,126 (3.68 per match)
- Top goalscorer: Jean Baratte (31)

Olympique de Marseille won Division 1 season 1947/1948 of the French Association Football League with 48 points.

== Participating teams ==
=== Changes from previous season ===
Teams promoted from 1946–47 French Division 2

- Champions: Sochaux
- Runners-up: Olympique Alès

Teams relegated to 1947–48 French Division 2

- 17th placed: Lens
- 18th placed: Bordeaux
- 19th placed: Le Havre
- 20th placed: Rouen

=== Team list ===
- Olympique Alès
- AS Cannes
- Lille OSC
- Olympique de Marseille
- FC Metz
- SO Montpellier
- FC Nancy
- RC Paris
- Red Star Olympique
- Stade de Reims
- Stade Rennais UC
- CO Roubaix-Tourcoing
- AS Saint-Étienne
- FC Sète
- FC Sochaux-Montbéliard
- Stade Français FC
- RC Strasbourg
- Toulouse FC
Location of teams in 1947–48 Division 1

== Final table ==
Pos	Team	Pld	W	D	L	GF	GA	GAv	Pts	Qualification or relegation
1	Marseille (C)	34	20	8	6	83	43	1.930	48	
2	Lille	34	20	7	7	82	51	1.608	47	
3	Reims	34	20	6	8	73	34	2.147	46	
4	Saint-Étienne	34	16	9	9	72	58	1.241	41	
5	Stade Français	34	15	8	11	68	58	1.172	38	
6	Strasbourg	34	13	11	10	82	58	1.414	37	
7	Racing Paris	34	16	5	13	79	64	1.234	37	
8	Roubaix-Tourcoing	34	15	7	12	62	60	1.033	37	
9	Sochaux	34	13	8	13	63	59	1.068	34	
10	Rennes	34	13	8	13	56	59	0.949	34	
11	Metz	34	13	4	17	70	82	0.854	30	
12	Nancy	34	11	8	15	49	64	0.766	30	
13	Toulouse	34	13	3	18	50	62	0.806	29	
14	Cannes	34	10	9	15	47	66	0.712	29	
15	Montpellier	34	10	8	16	52	67	0.776	28	
16	Sète	34	11	4	19	59	85	0.694	26	
17	Alès (R)	34	7	11	16	49	79	0.620	25	Relegation to French Division 2
18	Red Star	34	6	4	24	30	77	0.390	16	Merged into Stade Français (Note: Red Star merged into Stade Français at the end of the season, and the club did not return until 1950.)

Rules for classification: Victory: 2 points, Draw: 1 point, Defeat: 0 points
(C) Champions; (R) Relegated
Notes:

Promoted from Division 2, who will play in Division 1 season 1948/1949

- OGC Nice: Champion of Division 2
- SR Colmar: Runner-up

== Results ==
Home \ Away	ALÈ	CAN	LIL	OM	MET	SOM	FCN	RCP	RSO	REI	REN	CRT	STE	SÉT	SOC	SFF	RCS	TOU
Alès		2–1	1–1	2–3	3–0	3–0	1–1	0–5	3–1	0–1	1–1	1–1	2–2	1–1	2–2	2–2	0–2	3–2
Cannes	4–1		0–2	0–2	1–1	1–1	2–1	4–4	1–0	0–4	5–2	1–1	0–3	1–2	3–0	2–0	2–2	1–0
Lille	5–2	3–0		3–0	3–1	4–1	4–1	2–1	2–0	0–0	1–1	4–0	0–0	5–3	6–1	1–3	1–1	3–0
Marseille	8–0	2–1	4–1		6–3	2–1	5–0	4–1	3–0	1–0	1–1	6–0	4–1	4–1	3–1	5–1	1–0	3–2
Metz	4–4	1–1	6–2	0–1		1–0	4–3	2–1	2–0	1–3	6–1	0–1	2–2	4–2	2–0	0–1	4–1	1–0
Montpellier	1–3	0–2	0–1	1–0	5–2		3–1	6–0	0–0	2–3	2–2	1–1	2–0	1–1	2–0	6–2	1–1	1–3
Nancy	1–0	1–1	2–1	4–0	4–2	2–2		1–3	5–1	1–2	1–0	0–4	4–0	2–0	2–1	0–0	3–0	0–0
Racing Paris	0–0	2–3	1–4	1–1	4–2	6–1	3–0		2–1	2–1	2–4	2–1	2–2	7–1	2–1	1–5	4–2	2–0
Red Star Olympique	3–1	3–2	1–2	2–2	0–1	3–4	2–0	1–3		0–2	3–5	1–1	0–5	1–0	0–0	0–7	0–5	1–2
Reims	1–0	3–0	2–2	3–0	4–2	1–0	5–0	2–2	1–0		1–0	1–1	6–0	3–0	4–0	0–3	2–2	4–0
Rennes	4–1	0–0	4–2	1–1	0–2	4–1	0–0	2–0	1–0	1–0		4–4	1–3	3–0	0–3	0–3	7–1	2–0
Roubaix-Tourcoing	1–0	3–1	1–5	1–1	1–2	7–0	3–0	5–2	1–0	2–1	1–2		0–3	2–4	3–1	1–0	3–2	1–3
Saint-Étienne	3–3	2–0	8–3	3–2	3–0	2–2	2–0	1–4	4–1	3–2	1–0	1–2		3–1	2–1	1–1	1–1	4–2
Sète	2–3	4–0	1–2	1–3	2–1	0–1	4–3	3–2	1–2	4–2	2–0	1–5	4–2		1–5	3–2	3–2	2–2
Sochaux	2–0	5–1	1–2	2–2	4–3	1–0	2–2	3–2	0–1	0–3	2–0	5–1	2–2	2–2		4–0	1–0	4–0
Stade Français	3–1	1–4	1–1	1–1	7–1	4–1	2–3	0–1	4–0	2–1	3–1	0–2	2–1	4–1	2–2		2–2	2–1
Strasbourg	9–3	8–2	2–0	1–1	8–4	0–1	1–1	1–2	3–1	2–2	6–1	3–0	2–0	3–1	2–2	1–1		3–1
Toulouse FC	2–0	0–0	1–4	3–1	4–3	4–2	4–0	1–0	2–1	1–3	0–1	2–1	0–2	2–1	2–3	4–0	0–3	

Legend: Blue = home team win; Yellow = draw; Red = away team win.

== Top goalscorers ==
Rank	Player	Club	Goals
1	(France) Jean Baratte	Lille	31
2	(France) Pierre Sinibaldi	Reims	25
3	(France) (Poland) Boleslav Tempowski	Lille	23
4	(France) Jean Grumellon	Rennes	22
5	(France) Larbi Ben Barek	Stade Français	20
5	(France) (Hungary) Desiré Koranyi	Sète	20
5	(Czechoslovakia) Jozef Humpal	Sochaux	20
8	(France) Georges Moreel	Racing Paris	18
9	(France) Alphonse Rolland	Strasbourg	17
10	(France) Émile Bongiorni	Racing Paris	16
10	(France) Ernest Vaast	Racing Paris	16

== Attendances ==
Rank	Team	Home games	Average attendance
1	Olympique de Marseille	17	18,799
2	Stade Français	17	18,071
3	RC Paris	17	16,008
4	RC Strasbourg	17	12,300
5	AS Saint-Étienne	17	11,662
6	LOSC	17	11,565
7	Red Star Olympique	17	10,153
8	Stade de Reims	17	9,340
9	SO Montpellier	17	8,687
10	FC Nancy	17	7,877
11	Toulouse FC	17	7,850
12	FC Metz	17	7,384
13	FC Sochaux-Montbéliard	17	6,486
14	CO Roubaix-Tourcoing	17	6,339
15	Olympique Alès	17	6,000
16	Stade Rennais	17	5,830
17	AS Cannes	17	5,810
18	FC Sète	17	5,114
