= Léon Deladerrière =

French footballer and coach (1927–2013)

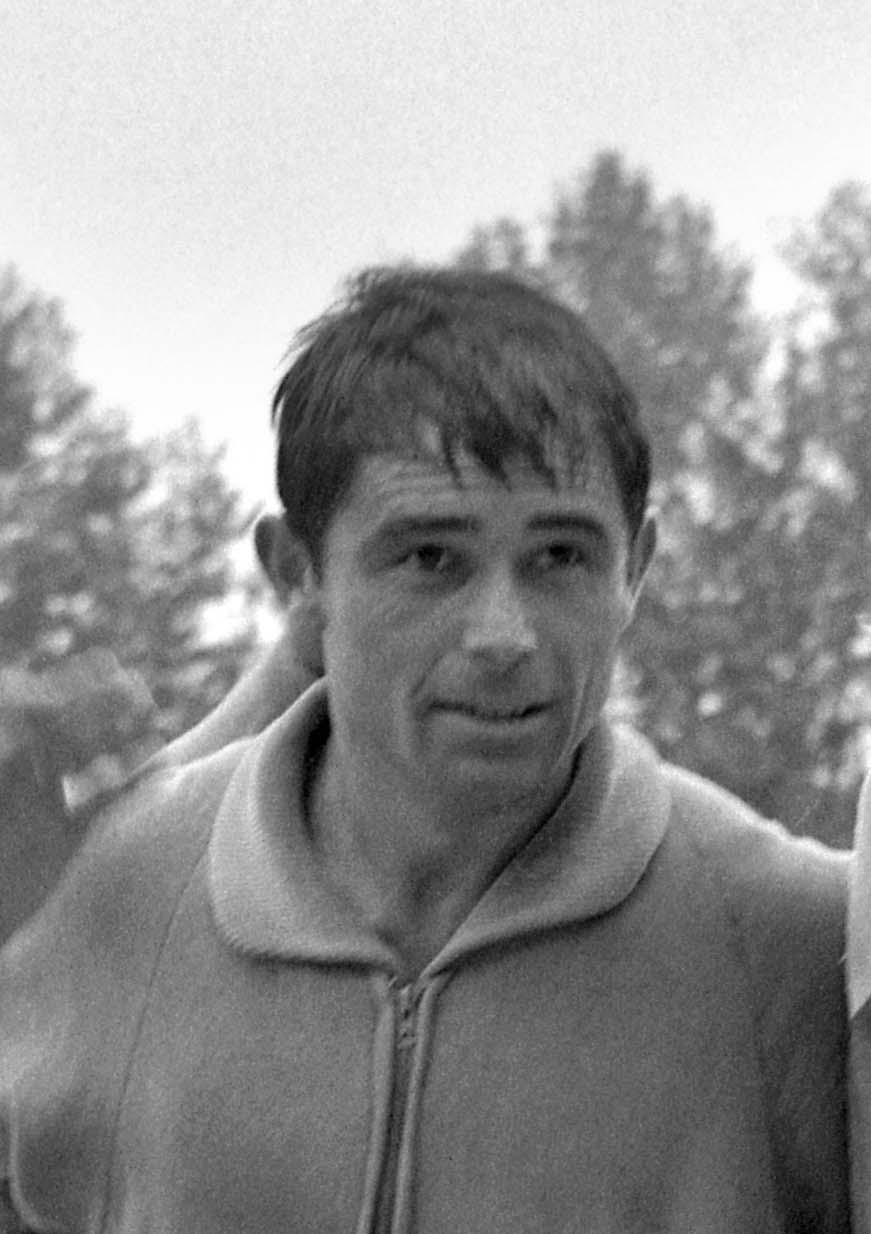
- Deladerrière in 1962

Personal information
- Date of birth: 26 June 1927
- Place of birth: Annœullin, France
- Date of death: 13 March 2013 (aged 85)
- Place of death: Rixheim, France
- Position: Striker

Senior career*
Years	Team	Apps	(Gls)
1947–1959	Nancy	350	(105)
1959–1963	Toulouse FC	58	(10)

International career
1952–1958	France	11	(3)

Managerial career
- 1961–1964: Toulouse FC
- 1964–1965: Nancy
- 1965–1967: Châteauroux
- 1967–1973: Mulhouse
- 1973: Boulogne
- * Club domestic league appearances and goals

Léon Deladerrière (French pronunciation: [leɔ̃ dəladɛʁjɛʁ]; 26 July 1927 – 13 March 2013) was a French football player and coach.

He played for FC Nancy and Toulouse FC. After his playing career, he became a coach with Toulouse FC, FC Nancy, Châteauroux, Mulhouse and Boulogne.
