= Jacques Favre =

French footballer (1921–2008)

Personal information
- Date of birth: 6 May 1921
- Place of birth: Laon, France
- Date of death: 8 May 2008 (aged 87)
- Place of death: Mutzig, France
- Position: Goalkeeper

Senior career*
Years	Team	Apps	(Gls)
1939–1943	Reims		
1943–1944	EF Reims-Champagne		
1944–1948	Reims		
1948–1949	Nice		
1949–1954	FC Nancy		

Managerial career
- 1953–1955: FC Nancy
- 1955–1958: Metz
- 1959–1960: Gent
- 1962–1963: Roubaix-Tourcoing
- 1963–1966: Metz
- 1966–1968: Angoulême
- 1970–1971: Nancy (assistant coach)
- 1971–1972: Metz
- 1973–1974: Boulogne
- * Club domestic league appearances and goals

Jacques Favre (6 May 1921 – 8 May 2008) was a French football player and manager who played as a goalkeeper.

Born in Laon, Aisne, he played for Reims, Nice and FC Nancy. He coached FC Nancy, Metz, Gent, Roubaix-Tourcoing, Angoulême, AS Nancy and Boulogne.
