= 1957–58 French Division 1 =

20th season of French Division 1

Division Nationale
- Season: 1957–58

Stade de Reims won Division 1 season 1957/1958 of the French Association Football League with 48 points.

== Participating teams ==
- Olympique Alès
- Angers SCO
- AS Béziers
- RC Lens
- Lille OSC
- Olympique Lyonnais
- Olympique de Marseille
- FC Metz
- AS Monaco
- OGC Nice
- Nîmes Olympique
- RC Paris
- Stade de Reims
- AS Saint-Etienne
- UA Sedan-Torcy
- FC Sochaux-Montbéliard
- Toulouse FC
- US Valenciennes-Anzin
Location of teams in 1957–58 Division 1

== Final table ==
Pos	Team	Pld	W	D	L	GF	GA	GAv	Pts	Qualification or relegation
1	Reims (C)	34	22	4	8	89	42	2.119	48	Qualification to European Cup preliminary round
2	Nîmes	34	16	9	9	61	39	1.564	41	
3	Monaco	34	15	11	8	50	35	1.429	41	
4	Angers	34	16	9	9	65	46	1.413	41	
5	Sedan	34	16	6	12	74	70	1.057	38	
6	Lille	34	17	3	14	71	59	1.203	37	
7	Saint-Étienne	34	10	17	7	55	52	1.058	37	
8	Lyon	34	13	9	12	51	53	0.962	35	Invited to Inter-Cities Fairs Cup
9	Racing Paris	34	13	7	14	61	62	0.984	33	
10	Toulouse	34	13	7	14	53	57	0.930	33	
11	Lens	34	13	7	14	55	62	0.887	33	
12	Sochaux	34	13	6	15	61	61	1.000	32	
13	Nice	34	10	11	13	71	53	1.340	31	
14	Alès	34	10	8	16	41	59	0.695	28	
15	Valenciennes	34	8	12	14	37	64	0.578	28	
16	Marseille	34	8	10	16	46	65	0.708	26	
17	Metz (R)	34	9	8	17	45	68	0.662	26	Relegation to French Division 2
18	Béziers Hérault (R)	34	9	6	19	38	77	0.494	24	Relegation to French Division 2

Rules for classification: Victory: 2 points, Draw: 1 point, Defeat: 0 points
(C) Champions; (R) Relegated

Promoted from Division 2, who will play in Division 1 season 1958/1959

- FC Nancy: Champion of Division 2
- Stade Rennais UC: runner-up
- Limoges FC: Third place
- RC Strasbourg: Fourth place

== Results ==
Home \ Away	ALÈ	ANG	ASB	RCL	LIL	OL	OM	MET	ASM	NIC	NMS	RCP	REI	STE	SED	SOU	TOU	VAL
Alès		0–0	2–0	0–1	2–1	2–2	1–0	4–1	1–1	1–1	1–1	1–3	2–0	0–2	2–0	2–1	2–0	0–1
Angers	1–1		3–1	5–0	0–0	2–1	2–2	3–1	3–2	2–1	1–2	0–0	0–1	2–2	1–1	5–1	0–1	3–4
Béziers	3–2	4–4		1–1	2–0	1–1	0–0	0–1	0–3	0–1	0–1	1–0	2–0	2–2	0–2	2–1	2–0	3–1
Lens	5–0	2–1	3–1		1–0	4–4	3–1	2–2	0–1	1–0	1–1	1–1	0–1	1–3	2–3	1–1	3–1	2–0
Lille	1–0	2–3	10–1	4–1		3–0	3–1	2–1	1–1	1–0	3–1	1–3	2–1	1–2	3–0	3–2	1–3	2–3
Lyon	2–0	2–3	2–1	3–1	2–0		1–1	2–0	2–0	1–1	1–0	2–0	1–2	0–2	0–3	1–1	3–1	1–1
Marseille	1–0	1–2	0–1	3–2	3–4	2–3		2–2	2–1	2–1	1–3	1–1	3–3	1–0	1–1	0–3	3–0	1–1
Metz	0–1	0–3	4–0	1–4	2–3	2–1	1–2		0–0	1–1	0–1	1–1	3–1	0–2	3–2	1–0	2–1	1–0
Monaco	3–1	0–2	2–0	2–1	1–0	1–2	3–2	2–1		1–1	1–1	3–2	3–0	0–0	1–1	5–2	0–2	4–0
Nice	6–1	0–0	6–1	0–2	5–5	2–2	3–0	6–2	0–1		2–0	2–0	1–2	6–1	8–0	4–3	2–2	1–1
Nîmes	3–0	5–1	2–0	2–3	2–0	2–0	5–0	1–1	0–0	3–2		0–1	3–0	2–2	2–2	2–0	3–2	5–0
Racing Paris	3–2	1–2	1–0	5–0	1–3	2–4	4–3	1–2	2–3	3–1	3–1		1–5	1–1	4–2	6–4	1–2	2–2
Reims	4–2	2–3	5–0	5–0	3–1	4–0	4–1	5–1	1–1	3–2	2–1	4–1		4–0	3–0	3–1	2–2	4–2
Saint-Étienne	2–2	0–3	1–2	3–1	6–2	1–1	1–1	2–2	2–1	1–1	1–1	0–1	0–0		3–3	2–2	1–1	5–1
Sedan	5–2	1–0	8–4	2–3	3–2	2–3	2–1	6–3	2–1	3–2	3–1	2–0	2–5	1–1		4–1	3–0	2–1
Sochaux	3–1	2–1	4–0	1–0	2–4	1–0	1–2	1–0	1–2	4–0	1–1	5–0	0–4	4–1	2–1		4–2	1–0
Toulouse FC	2–3	1–3	3–2	3–2	1–2	3–1	1–1	4–1	0–0	2–1	4–0	1–1	1–0	2–3	2–1	0–0		3–2
Valenciennes	0–0	2–1	1–1	1–1	0–1	2–0	2–1	2–2	0–0	1–1	0–3	0–5	0–6	0–0	3–1	1–1	2–0	

Legend: Blue = home team win; Yellow = draw; Red = away team win.

== Top goalscorers ==
Rank	Player	Club	Goals
1	(France) Just Fontaine	Reims	34
2	(France) Fernand De Vlaeminck	Lille	23
3	(Argentina) Alberto Muro	Nice	21
3	(France) Ernie Schultz	Toulouse FC	21
5	(Sweden) Ingve Brodd	Sochaux	18
6	(France) Roger Piantoni	Reims	17
7	(France) (Ivory Coast) Jean Topka	Alès	16
7	(France) Stéphane Bruey	Angers	16
9	(Morocco) Hassan Akesbi	Nîmes	15
9	(France) (Poland) Henri Skiba	Nîmes	15
9	(France) René Bliard	Reims	15

== Attendances ==
#	Club	Average attendance
1	RC Paris	19,803
2	Marseille	14,730
3	Saint-Étienne	13,449
4	LOSC	11,355
5	Nice	11,355
6	Olympique lyonnais	10,526
7	Lens	10,022
8	Angers	9,574
9	Nîmes	9,398
10	Valenciennes	9,336
11	Reims	8,955
12	Toulouse	8,201
13	Béziers	7,673
14	Alès	6,500
15	Sedan	6,153
16	Sochaux	5,781
17	Metz	5,413
18	Monaco	5,334
