= Marcel Ourdouillié =

French footballer (1913-1962)

Personal information
- Date of birth: 18 December 1913
- Place of birth: Isbergues, France
- Date of death: 18 July 1962 (aged 48)
- Position: Midfielder

Senior career*
Years	Team	Apps	(Gls)
–1938	USL Dunkerque		
1938–1950	RC Lens		

International career
1945	France	1	(0)
- * Club domestic league appearances and goals

Marcel Ourdouillié (18 December 1913 – 18 July 1962) was a French footballer. He played with USL Dunkerque and RC Lens, as well as the France national team.
