= Mohamed Ben Brahim =

Moroccan footballer

Personal information
- Date of birth: 1920
- Place of birth: Oujda, Morocco
- Height: 1.76 m (5 ft 9 in)
- Position: Defensive midfielder

Senior career*
Years	Team	Apps	(Gls)
- Fès
1945–1947	Sète		
1947–1952	FC Nancy	65	(4)
1952–1953	Racing Besançon	4	(0)
- * Club domestic league appearances and goals

Mohamed Ben Brahim was a Moroccan footballer who played for French clubs FC Sète, Besançon RC and FC Nancy as a defensive midfielder.
