= Marcel Poblome =

French footballer (1921–2009)

Marcel Poblome (1 February 1921 – 17 July 2009) was a French footballer who played as a forward.

== Career ==
Born in Tourcoing, Poblome played club football for Excelsior AC Roubaix (1942–1943), É.F. Nancy-Lorraine (1943–1944), Excelsior AC Roubaix (1944–1945), FC Nancy (1945–1948), Toulouse FC (1948–1950), AS Monaco (1950–1951) and Le Mans FC (1951–1952). With É.F. Nancy-Lorraine, he won the Coupe de France in 1944 and was the Division 2 champion of France in 1946 with FC Nancy.

He died on 17 July 2009, at Gorcy, Meurthe-et-Moselle at the age of 88.
