= Pierre Grillet =

French footballer (1932-2018)

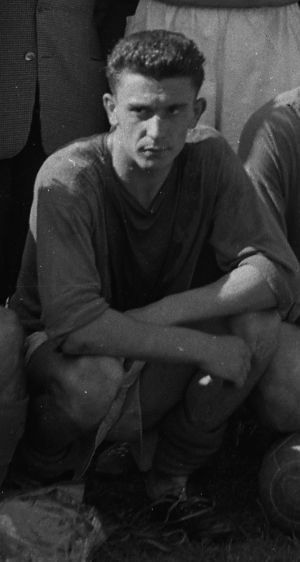

Personal information
- Date of birth: 21 March 1932
- Place of birth: Piolenc, France
- Date of death: 10 January 2018 (aged 85)
- Position: Striker

Senior career*
Years	Team	Apps	(Gls)
1950–1960	RC Paris	187	(63)
1960–1961	Toulouse	25	(6)
1961–1962	Nantes	18	(5)

International career
1954–1960	France	9	(2)
- * Club domestic league appearances and goals

Pierre Grillet (21 March 1932 – 10 January 2018) was a French football striker.
