= Ladislas Smid =

Hungarian-born French footballer (1915-1990)

Personal information
- Date of birth: 1 May 1915
- Place of birth: Budapest, Hungary
- Date of death: 24 September 1990 (aged 75)
- Place of death: France
- Position: Midfielder

Senior career*
| Years | Team | Apps | (Gls) |
| –1934 | Attila FC | | |
| 1934–1950 | RC Lens | | |

International career
| 1945 | France | 4 | (0) |
- * Club domestic league appearances and goals

Ladislas Smid (1 May 1915 – 24 September 1990) was a Hungarian-born French football player who played with Attila FC and RC Lens, as well as the France national team.
