= 1951–52 French Division 2 =

13th season of the second-tier football league in France

Division 2
- Season: 1951–52

Statistics of Division 2 in the 1951–52 season.

== Overview ==
It was contested by 18 teams, and Stade Français won the championship.

== League standings ==
Pos	Team	Pld	W	D	L	GF	GA	GD	Pts	Promotion or relegation
1	Stade Français	34	27	2	5	100	38	+62	56	Promoted
2	Montpellier	34	21	5	8	68	37	+31	47	Promoted
3	Valenciennes	34	17	9	8	68	44	+24	43	
4	Nantes	34	17	8	9	61	57	+4	42	
5	AS Monaco	34	16	8	10	54	40	+14	40	
6	Angers	34	16	8	10	64	57	+7	40	
7	Grenoble	34	16	4	14	64	55	+9	36	
8	Besançon	34	13	9	12	83	65	+18	35	
9	Toulon	34	14	7	13	56	63	−7	35	
10	Rouen	34	13	8	13	64	44	+20	34	
11	AS Troyes	34	13	8	13	58	56	+2	34	
12	Toulouse	34	14	6	14	52	57	−5	34	
13	Cannes	34	12	3	19	57	77	−20	27	
14	CA Paris	34	12	3	19	38	52	−14	27	
15	Béziers Hérault	34	9	6	19	41	63	−22	24	
16	Amiens	34	7	8	19	43	84	−41	22	
17	Le Mans	34	7	5	22	45	87	−42	19	
18	Olympique Alès	34	5	7	22	41	84	−43	17	

Source: rsssf.com
