= 1948–49 French Division 1 =

11th season of French Division 1

Division Nationale
- Season: 1948–49

Stade de Reims won Division 1 season 1948/1949 of the French Association Football League with 48 points.

== Participating teams ==
- AS Cannes
- SR Colmar
- Lille OSC
- Olympique de Marseille
- FC Metz
- SO Montpellier
- FC Nancy
- OGC Nice
- RC Paris
- Stade de Reims
- Stade Rennais UC
- CO Roubaix-Tourcoing
- AS Saint-Étienne
- FC Sète
- FC Sochaux-Montbéliard
- Stade Français FC
- RC Strasbourg
- Toulouse FC
Location of teams in 1948–49 Division 1

== Final table ==
Pos	Team	Pld	W	D	L	GF	GA	GAv	Pts	Qualification or relegation
1	Reims (C)	34	22	4	8	90	54	1.667	48	
2	Lille	34	21	5	8	102	40	2.550	47	
3	Marseille	34	18	6	10	95	58	1.638	42	
4	Rennes	34	16	9	9	61	49	1.245	41	
5	Sochaux	34	16	6	12	74	52	1.423	38	
6	Racing Paris	34	14	8	12	71	56	1.268	36	
7	Nice	34	13	10	11	60	58	1.034	36	
8	Saint-Étienne	34	13	9	12	68	72	0.944	35	
9	Toulouse	34	16	2	16	56	53	1.057	34	
10	Stade Français-Red Star	34	10	12	12	59	72	0.819	32	
11	Colmar (R)	34	12	7	15	61	78	0.782	31	Demoted to the CFA [fr] (Note: Colmar were demoted to the CFA since the club gave up its professional status.)
12	Montpellier	34	12	5	17	57	71	0.803	29	
13	Roubaix-Tourcoing	34	11	7	16	55	89	0.618	29	
14	Sète	34	10	9	15	34	58	0.586	29	
15	Nancy	34	11	6	17	53	69	0.768	28	
16	Metz	34	10	6	18	60	79	0.759	26	
17	Strasbourg	34	10	6	18	40	68	0.588	26	
18	Cannes (R)	34	10	5	19	42	62	0.677	25	Relegation to French Division 2

Rules for classification: Victory: 2 points, Draw: 1 point, Defeat: 0 points
(C) Champions; (R) Relegated
Notes:

Promoted from Division 2, who will play in Division 1 season 1949/1950

- RC Lens: Champion of Division 2
- Bordeaux: Runner-up

== Results ==
Home \ Away	CAN	SRC	LIL	OM	MET	SOM	FCN	NIC	RCP	REI	REN	CRT	STE	SÉT	SOC	SFF	RCS	TOU
Cannes		4–2	1–6	1–0	1–1	3–0	4–1	1–2	2–1	1–3	1–1	3–0	1–0	0–2	1–1	4–1	1–1	2–1
Colmar	1–1		2–2	1–1	5–1	1–3	0–2	1–2	3–0	3–3	2–2	5–0	3–1	5–1	0–3	3–0	2–1	2–0
Lille	2–0	8–0		2–2	5–0	5–0	4–0	4–1	2–3	2–1	3–0	6–2	5–0	6–1	3–1	2–1	1–2	1–1
Marseille	1–0	7–2	2–1		4–2	6–3	3–1	2–2	3–0	3–4	1–3	4–2	6–1	3–1	3–1	1–1	5–0	4–0
Metz	2–1	2–0	3–1	1–4		2–2	2–0	2–2	1–2	2–3	1–6	3–0	2–0	0–2	4–1	2–3	3–0	2–1
Montpellier	1–3	0–1	2–1	1–2	4–1		3–4	1–1	0–4	0–1	2–1	4–1	2–2	1–0	2–1	6–1	2–0	2–1
Nancy	1–0	1–2	0–1	3–2	2–1	1–0		1–1	3–1	0–1	1–2	1–2	4–2	3–0	2–2	3–1	3–3	2–0
Nice	2–0	2–0	1–2	0–5	5–2	0–0	0–0		3–0	2–2	8–0	4–2	1–0	4–1	5–4	2–2	1–0	2–1
Racing Paris	3–0	3–3	4–3	5–4	2–2	1–1	5–1	1–1		3–1	2–3	1–1	1–2	5–1	0–1	4–0	4–2	5–0
Reims	5–2	1–2	2–4	2–0	6–1	6–4	3–3	6–1	1–0		4–2	1–0	2–3	2–0	2–2	4–0	2–0	3–0
Rennes	1–0	2–0	1–1	6–1	4–3	3–0	4–0	2–0	0–0	1–0		3–1	1–3	3–1	1–0	1–1	1–1	2–0
Roubaix-Tourcoing	4–0	3–2	1–4	2–10	2–2	2–3	3–1	2–1	2–2	1–5	3–2		2–2	2–1	5–1	2–2	1–0	3–1
Saint-Étienne	3–1	5–2	2–2	4–1	3–1	0–4	4–1	2–0	3–3	2–3	1–1	6–0		0–1	1–1	2–2	5–1	4–2
Sète	1–0	3–4	1–0	1–1	1–1	2–1	1–0	3–2	0–2	1–2	0–0	0–0	1–1		3–0	1–0	0–1	0–0
Sochaux	4–0	2–0	1–3	1–1	2–1	4–2	3–2	2–0	1–2	3–0	3–1	5–1	6–0	7–0		0–2	3–0	3–0
Stade Français	6–3	5–2	1–0	1–0	2–6	3–0	3–3	1–1	1–0	3–5	0–0	1–1	4–1	2–2	2–2		1–1	3–1
Strasbourg	1–0	0–0	0–6	1–2	2–1	3–0	4–2	3–1	3–1	1–4	3–0	1–2	1–2	0–0	0–3	3–2		0–1
Toulouse FC	1–0	7–0	1–4	2–1	1–0	4–1	2–1	3–0	2–1	2–0	2–1	2–0	5–1	0–2	3–0	4–1	5–1	

Legend: Blue = home team win; Yellow = draw; Red = away team win.

== Top goalscorers ==
Rank	Player	Club	Goals
1	(France) Jean Baratte	Lille	26
1	(Czechoslovakia) Jozef Humpal	Sochaux	26
3	(France) Henri Baillot	Metz	25
4	(France) Jean Grumellon	Rennes	24
5	(France) Pierre Bini	Reims	22
6	(France) André Strappe	Lille	20
7	(France) Georges Moreel	Racing Paris	19
8	(France) Jean-Jacques Kretschmar	Roubaix-Tourcoing	18
9	(France) Marius Walter	Lille	17
9	(France) René Bihel	Marseille	17
9	(France) Roger Quenolle	Racing Paris	17
9	(France) Antoine Rodriguez	Saint-Étienne	17

== Attendances ==
#	Club	Average
1	Marseille	18,799
2	Stade français	18,071
3	Racing	16,008
4	Strasbourg	12,300
5	Saint-Étienne	11,662
6	LOSC	11,565
7	Red Star	10,153
8	Reims	9,340
9	MHSC	8,687
10	Nancy	7,877
11	Toulouse	7,850
12	Metz	7,384
13	Sochaux	6,486
14	Roubaix-Tourcoing	6,339
15	Colmar	6,000
16	Stade rennais	5,830
17	Cannes	5,810
18	Sète	5,114
