= SR Colmar =

French football club

Colmar
- Full name: Stadium Racing Colmar
- Nickname: Les Verts (The Greens)
- Short name: SRC
- Founded: 1919; 107 years ago as AS Colmar
- Ground: Colmar Stadium
- Capacity: 7,000
- President: Adel Bouazdi
- Manager: José Guerra
- League: National 2 Group B
- 2024–25: National 3 Group H, 1st of 14 (promoted)
- Website: http://sr-colmar.fr/
Home colours	Away colours

Stadium Racing Colmar is a football club located in Colmar, France. They play in the National 3, the fifth tier of French football.

== History ==
Founded in 1919 as AS Colmar, the club is based in Colmar, Alsace, and plays its home matches at the Colmar Stadium in the city. SR Colmar has played one season in the Division 1 (Ligue 1) in 1948–49 and have spent five seasons in the Division 2 (Ligue 2). On 23 January 2010, Colmar defeated professional club Lille in the Coupe de France 10–9 on penalty kicks, giving the club one of its biggest victories to date.

The club was liquidated in November 2016, and was reformed as Stadium Racing Colmar.

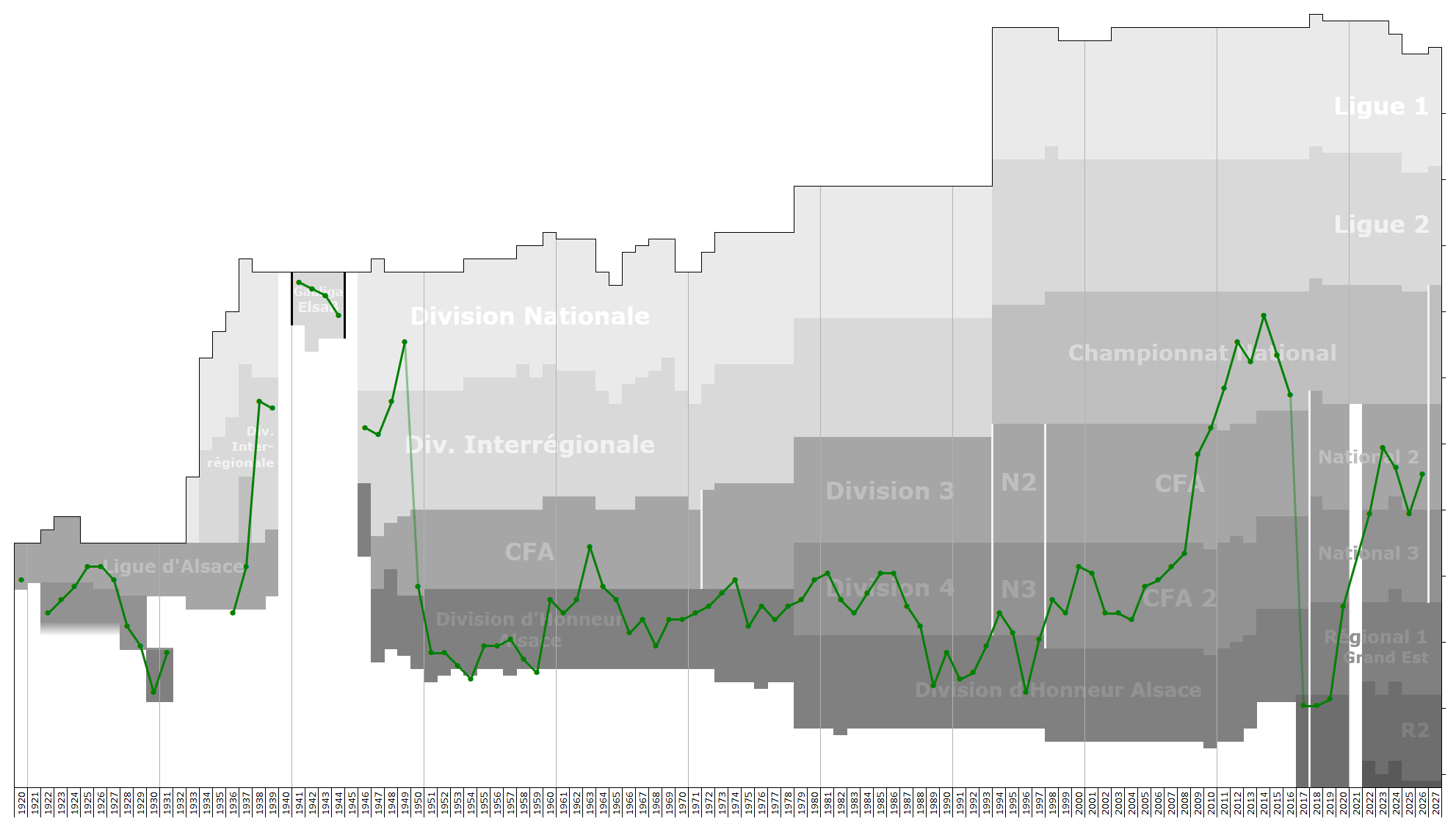
Historical league performance chart of SR Colmar

=== Name changes ===
- 1919–1920: AS Colmar
- 1920–1940: Sports Réunis Colmar
- 1940–1944: SpVgg Kolmar
- 1945–1962: Sports Réunis Colmar
- 1962–1963: SR Colmar Wittisheim
- 1963–1964: AS Colmar
- 1964–2016: Sports Réunis Colmar
- 2016–present: Stadium Racing Colmar

== Stadium ==
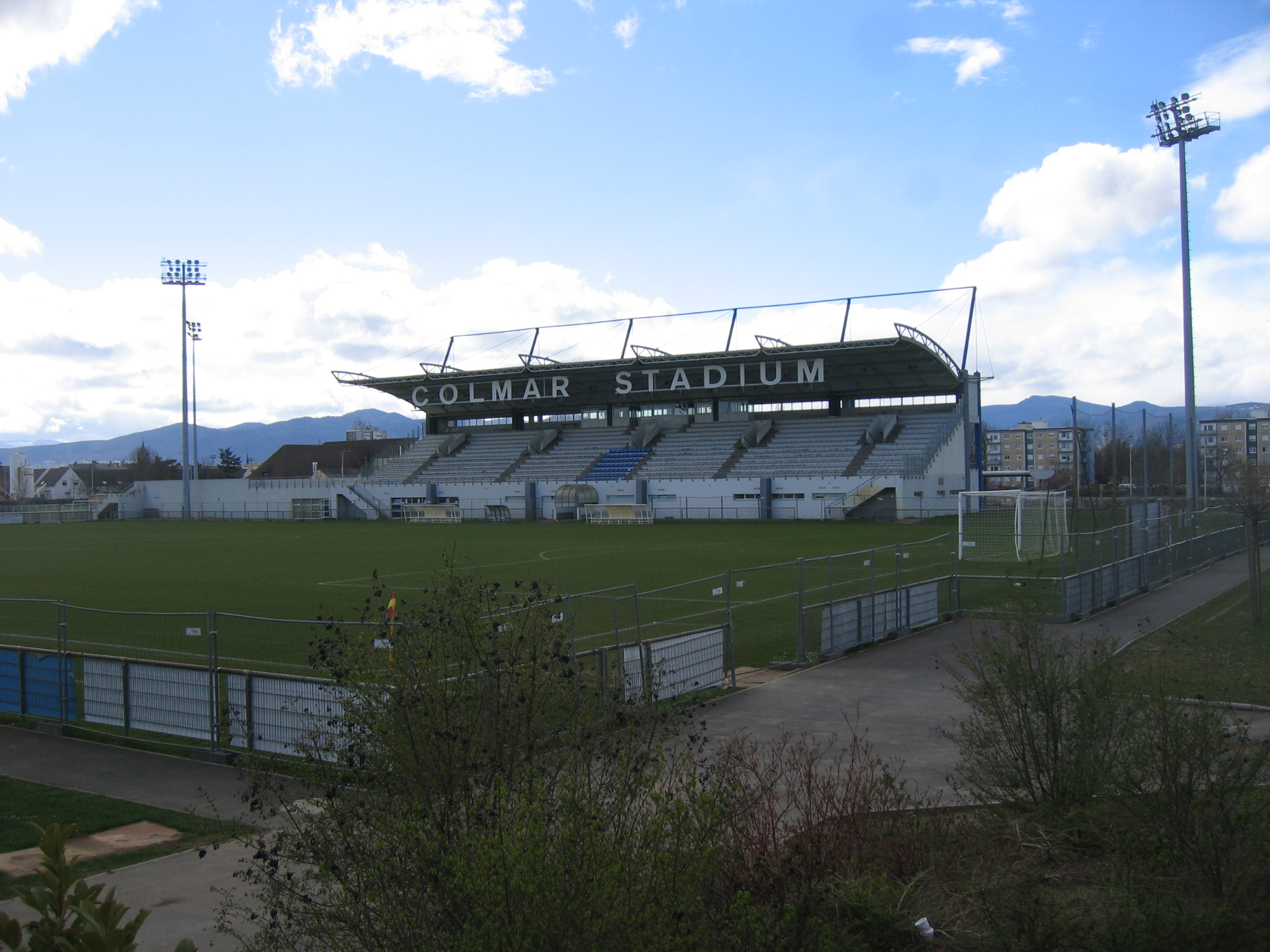
The Colmar Stadium

Owned by the city of Colmar, the Colmar Stadium has been the home of SR Colmar since 2001, succeeding the Stade des Francs. The sports complex at the ground is made up of three football fields, including one of synthetic grass. The main pitch has a surface of natural grass. The stadium has a grandstand with a seating capacity of 1,300; 40 seats are accessible to the handicapped.

== Honours ==
- Championnat de France Amateur
  - Champions (1): 2009–10 (Group A)
- Division d'Honneur Alsace
  - Champions (2): 1972–73, 1996–97

== Notable players ==
- (France) Esteban Lepaul (youth)
- (France) Robin Risser (youth)
