= Marceau Somerlinck =

French footballer (1922–2005)

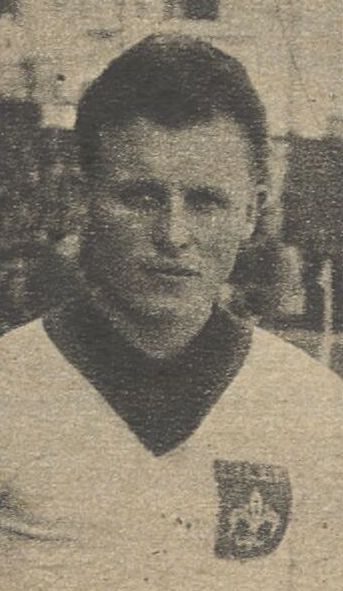

Personal information
- Date of birth: 4 January 1922
- Place of birth: Lille, France
- Date of death: 9 November 2005 (aged 83)
- Position: Defender

Youth career
- 1935–1943: SC Fives
- 1944–1945: Équipe fédérale Lille-Flandres

Senior career*
Years	Team	Apps	(Gls)
1945–1957	Lille		
- * Club domestic league appearances and goals

Marceau Somerlinck (4 January 1922 – 9 November 2005) was a French footballer who played as a defender for Lille. He won the Coupe de France a total of five times.

== Honours ==
Lille

- Division 1: 1946, 1954
- Coupe de France: 1946, 1947, 1948, 1953, 1955
