= Jean Baratte =

French footballer (1923–1986)

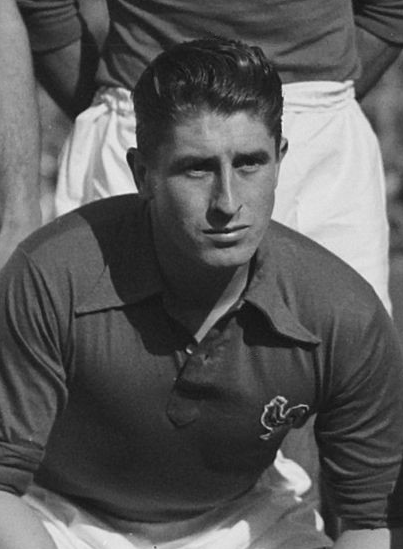
- Baratte in 1949

Personal information
- Date of birth: 7 June 1923
- Place of birth: Lambersart, France
- Date of death: 1 July 1986 (aged 63)
- Place of death: Faumont, France
- Position: Striker

Youth career
- –1941: Iris Club Lillois

Senior career*
| Years | Team | Apps | (Gls) |
| 1941–1943 | Olympique Lillois | | |
| 1943–1944 | EF Lille Flandres | 28 | (12) |
| 1944–1953 | Lille | 262 | (167) |
| 1953–1954 | AS Aix | 28 | (13) |
| 1954–1956 | CO Roubaix-Tourcoing | 41 | (12) |
| 1956–1957 | Lille | 14 | (3) |
| Total | | 373 | (207) |

International career
| 1944–1952 | France | 32 | (19) |

Managerial career
- 1955: CO Roubaix-Tourcoing
- 1959–1960: US Armentières
- 1960–1961: Roeselare
- 1961–1962: Lille
- 1962–1963: Espérance de Tunis
- Tûbingen
- 1966–1968: Racing club Lillois
- US Tourcoing
- 1976–1977: Racing club Arras
- SC Abbeville
- Olympique Marcquois
- * Club domestic league appearances and goals

Jean Baratte (7 June 1923 – 1 July 1986) was a French football player and manager. A striker, he played for Lille OSC and was the twelfth goal scorer in Ligue 1. At international level, he scored 19 goals in 32 appearances for the France national team.

== Honours ==
Lille

- Division 1: 1945–46, 1953–54
- Coupe de France: 1945–46, 1946–47, 1947–48, 1952–53

Individual

- Division 1 top scorer: 1947–48, 1948–49
