= Stade Français (association football) =

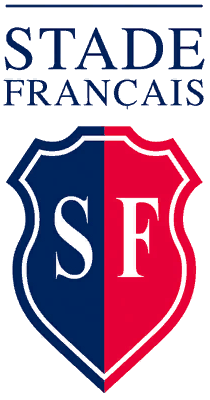
- Full name: Stade Français
- Founded: 1900; 126 years ago (football section)
- Ground: Haras Lupin, Vaucresson; France
- Website: stadefrancais.com/football/
Home colours

Stade Français (French: Stade français; French pronunciation: [stad fʁɑ̃sɛ]) is a French association football club team based in Paris that plays in the suburban town of Vaucresson. The team is the football section of the sports club Stade Français, whose Stade Français section is currently the most successful.

The team currently plays at the Haras Lupine sports center in Vaucresson (Hauts-de-Seine), in the western suburbs of Paris.

The club temporarily merged with other Île-de-France clubs several times in its history: with Cercle Athlétique de Paris between 1942 and 1944, and with Red Star to form Stade français-Red Star between 1948 and 1950. Stade Français played its matches at the Bauer stadium in Saint-Ouen (Seine-Saint-Denis) after the war, then at the Parc des Princes until 1968, and at the Jean-Bouin stadium in the 1970s and 1980s when the club competed at professional and national levels.

Stade Français experienced its peak during the post-war period, reaching the semi-final of the Coupe de France in 1949 under the name Stade Français-Red Star and winning the French second division title in 1952. Subsequently, the club participated in continental competitions with two appearances in the Inter-Cities Fairs Cup in the 1960s (1964–65 and 1965–66 editions).

Since abandoning professionalism and high-level football in the national and regional divisions in the 1980s, the club has competed in the lower divisions of the Hauts-de-Seine departmental football district.

== History ==
Founded in 1883, Stade Français (also a founding member of the USFSA) did not establish an association football section until 1900, which was created by Étienne Delavault. The team played at various venues, initially at Bécon, then at the Vélodrome de la Seine, before settling at La Faisanderie in the Saint-Cloud area from 1906. Stade Français gained professional status in 1942.

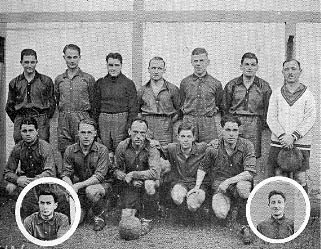
Team that won the Paris championship in 1926

The club experienced its moment of glory from 1945 when the club president established a team of professional stars in Paris, led by Larbi Ben Barek on the field and Helenio Herrera as coach. They entered Division 1 in 1946 and reached the semi-finals of the Coupe de France in 1949. However, the club returned to Division 2 the same year. Despite the unsuccessful merger with Red Star from 1948 to 1950 to form "Stade Français–Red Star", the club won its only trophy to date, the D2 championship in 1952. The club remained in Division 1 for only two years, being relegated in 1954 after losing the play-offs against Racing, despite having Dominique Colonna and Kees Rijvers in its ranks.

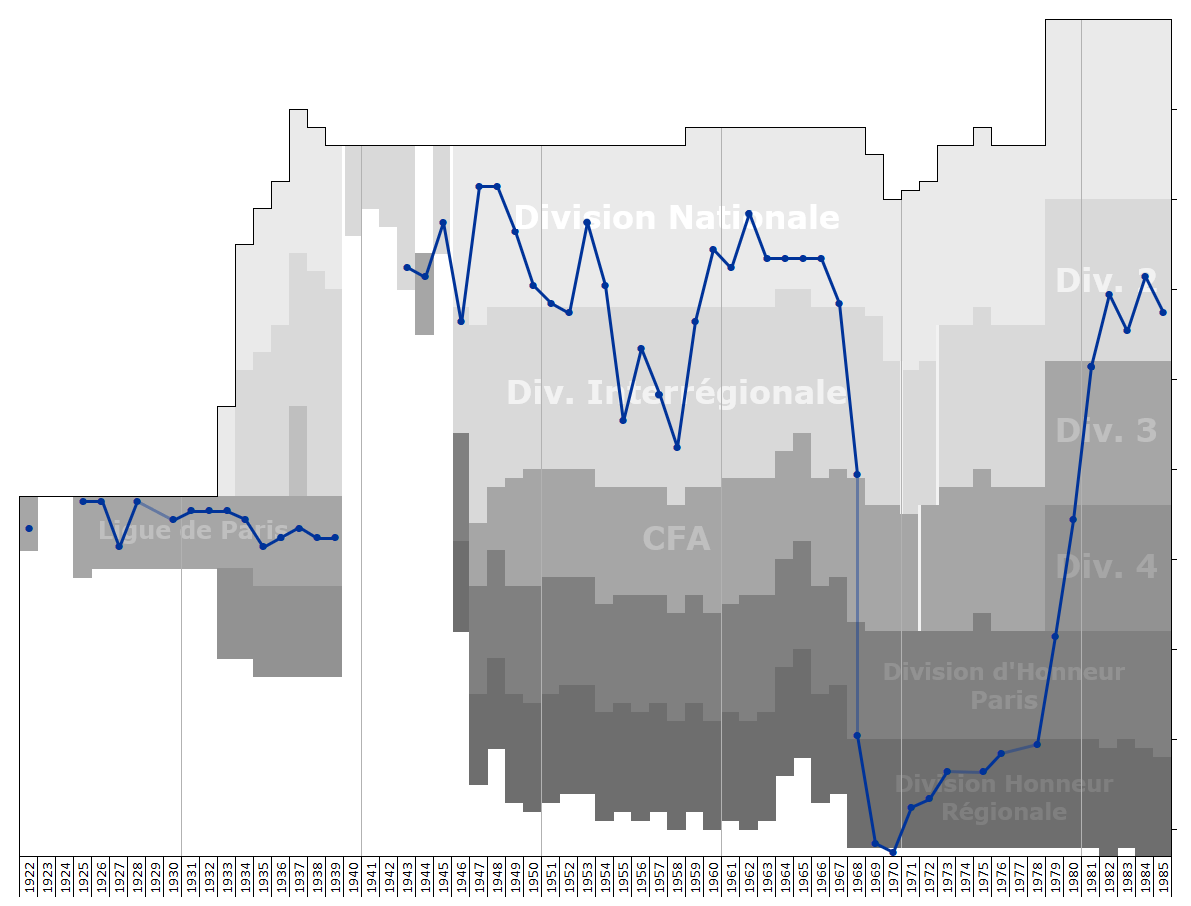
Historical league performance chart of Stade Français football club

Currently, the club is a member of the Paris Île-de-France Football League, where it registered in 1990. It participates in departmental competitions, and after a long period of decline, the club is again becoming ambitious. In 2009, under the leadership of its new president, Jean-Pierre Pochon, Stade Français decided to return to high-level competition and established a more dynamic organization. After repairing its two turf pitches, it simultaneously created an under-19 team and a senior team with the objective of winning titles. To mark the occasion, Stade Français provided its teams with a new jersey specifically designed to resemble those of the rugby club. Stade Français advanced for the second consecutive year and is thus in the fourth division of the Hauts-de-Seine departmental football district, with the aim of moving up a division each year.

== Names ==
Throughout its history, the club has changed its name several times:

- Stade Français (1900–42, 1943–44, 1945–48, 1950–66, 1968–81, 1985–present)
- Stade-CAP (1942–43)
- Stade-Capitale (1944–45)
- Stade Français-Red Star (1948–50)
- Stade de Paris FC (1966–68)
- Stade Français 92 (1981–85)

== International competition ==
| Season | Competition | Round | Club | Score |
|---|---|---|---|---|
| 1964–65 | Inter-Cities Fairs Cup | 1st round | Real Betis | 1–1, 2–0 |
| | Inter-Cities Fairs Cup | 2nd round | Juventus | 0–0, 0–1 |
| 1965–66 | Inter-Cities Fairs Cup | 1st round | Porto | 0–0, 0–1 |

== Notable players ==
French international players while playing for the club:

- Henri Arnaudeau
- Larbi Ben Barek
- Georges Carnus
- Raoul Chaisaz
- Robert Dauphin
- Edmond Delfour
- Jacques Dhur
- Marcel Domingo
- Jean Grégoire
- André Grillon
- Louis Hon
- André Lerond
- Maryan Synakowski
- Zbigniew Gut
- Jules Monsallier
- Henri Pavillard
- Robert Péri
- Pierre Ranzoni
- Yvon Ségalen
- Henri Skiba
- Édouard Stachowitz
- Jacques Wild
- Hakim Chabi (2021-2022)
- Kees Rijvers

== Managerial history ==
Some of the most notable managers of Stade Français have been:

- G. Davidović
- Accard (1942–43)
- Rose
- Helenio Herrera (1945–48)
- André Riou (1948–50)
- J. Drugeon (1950)
- W. Wolf (1950–51)
- Jean Grégoire (1951)
- Edmond Delfour (1952 – December 1953)
- André Grillon (December 1953 – 1954)
- Joseph Mercier (1954–61)
- Wadoux + Lerond (1961)
- Joseph Mercier (1961)
- Léon Rossi (1961 – November 1963)
- Henri Priami (November 1963–65)
- André Gérard (1965–67)
- Alain Avisse (1975–82)
- Claude Dusseau (1982–84)
- Yves Todorov (1984–85)

== Honours ==
=== National ===
- Division 2 (1): 1951–52
- Championnat de France (1): 1928

=== Regional ===
- Championat de Paris (6): 1925, 1926, 1928, 1954, 1965, 1979
- Coupe de Paris (1): 1978
