= FC Nancy =

- Full name: Football Club de Nancy
- Founded: 1901; 124 years ago
- Dissolved: 1968; 57 years ago
Home colours	Away colours

Football club de Nancy was a French association football team playing in the city of Nancy, Meurthe-et-Moselle. The team was founded in 1901 and dissolved in 1968. They won Ligue 2 once.

== Honours ==
- Coupe de France finalist in 1953, 1962
- Division 2 in 1946 (North group), 1958

== Players ==
- Roberto Aballay (1950–1952)
- Marcel Adamczyk (1960–1963)
- Georges Amanieu (1960–1964)
- Bachir Belaid (1952–1953)
- Mohamed Ben Brahim (1947–1952)
- Władysław Bialazyk (1946–1947)
- Edmond Biernat (1960–1963)
- Christian Bottollier (1949–1958)
- Pierre Brembilla (1945–1948)
- Stéphane Brezniak (1959–1962)
- Helge Bronee (1948–1950)
- Louis Cazal (1935–1936)
- Léo Cecchini (1945–1955)
- Michel Chevalier (1959–1964)
- Jacques Chrétien (1959–1964)
- Kurt Clemens (1951–1953), Internacional de Sarrland
- Hervé Collot (1952–1964)
- Emile Daniel (1950–1952)
- Léon Deladerrière (1947–1959)
- Jacques Favre (1949–1954)
- Bruno Ferrero (1957–1963)
- José Oscar Florindo (1961–1964)
- Orlando Gauthier (1959–1963)
- Brynley Griffiths (1954–1959)
- Antoine Groschulski (1960–1963)
- Albert Gudmundsson (1947–1948)
- Jean Hédiart (1953–1957)
- David Ickowitz (1945–1947)
- Gérard Jacó (1958–1962)
- Jozef Kuta (1948–1953)
- Juan Carlos Lorenzo (1952–1955)
- Jean Mathieu (1935–1938 et 1945–1948)
- Vinicius ramos de moraes (2010–2015)
- Roland Merschel (1963–1964)
- Roger Mindonnet (1951–1955)
- Georg Monsen (1950–1951)
- Alberto Muro (1959–1962)
- Pierre Nabat (1957–1959)
- Ernest Nunge (1949–1953)
- Papas Leão (1937–1939)
- Roger Piantoni (1950–1957)
- René Pleimelding (1948–1952, em seguida, 1957–1958)
- Marcel Poblome (1943–1948)
- Gustav Pollak (1937–1939)
- Antoine Redin (1954–1960)
- Max Sellal (1949–1951)
- Georges Sesia (1945–1948)
- Henri Skiba (1950–1951)
- Gustav Tögel (1937–1938)
- Aleksandrs Vanags (1947–1949)
- Oscar Vega (1950–1953)
- Daniel Viaene (1961–1962)
- Josef Wana (1937–1939)

== Managerial history ==
- Gaston Henri Boé (1935–1936)
- Louis Cazal (1936–1937)
- Karl Heinlein (1937–1938)
- Hillier (1938–1939)
- René Dedieu (1945–1946)
- Kaj Andrup (1946–1947)
- Pierre Brembilla (1948– September 1951)
- Jean Mathieu (September 1951– replaced in mid-season 1952–1953)
- Jacques Favre (1953–1955)
- Camille Cottin (1955–1957)
- André Gérard (1957–1959)
- Mario Zatelli (1959–1964)
- Léon Deladerrière (1964–1965)
