= 1955 Coupe de France final =

Final of the 1954–55 edition of the Coupe de France

- Event: 1954–55 Coupe de France
| Lille | Bordeaux |
| 5 | 2 |
- Date: 29 May 1955
- Venue: Olympique Yves-du-Manoir, Colombes
- Referee: Louis Fauquemberghe
- Attendance: 49,411

The 1955 Coupe de France final was a football match held on 29 May 1955 at the Stade Olympique Yves-du-Manoir in Colombes, France. It was the final of the 1954–55 edition of the Coupe de France. The match saw Lille defeat Bordeaux 5–2 thanks to goals by Jean Vincent, Yvon Douis (2), and Gérard Bourbotte (2).

== Match details ==
29 May 1955

| Lille | 5–2 | Bordeaux |
|---|---|---|
| Vincent 7'; Douis 28', 31'; Bourbotte 35', 75' | | Wozniesko 41'; Skander 63' |

Stade Olympique Yves-du-Manoir, Colombes
Attendance: 49,411
Referee: Louis Fauquemberghe

| GK | (France) Jean Van Gool |
| DF | (France) Antoine Pazur |
| DF | (France) Robert Lemaître |
| DF | (France) Roland Clauws |
| DF | (France) Guillaume Bieganski |
| MF | (France) Marceau Sommerlynck |
| MF | (France) Gérard Bourbotte |
| MF | (France) Yvon Douis |
| MF | (France) Jean Vincent |
| FW | (France) André Strappe | (c) |
| FW | (France) Bernard Lefevre |
Manager:
(France) André Cheuva Assistant Referees: Fourth Official:

| GK | (France) Jean-Guy Astresses |
| DF | (France) Simon Janczewski |
| DF | (France) Jacques Grimonpon | (c) |
| DF | (France) Jacques Debelleix |
| DF | (France) Manuel Garriga |
| MF | (Netherlands) Joop de Kubber |
| MF | (Algeria) Abdelhamid Skander |
| FW | (France) Raymond Wozniesko |
| FW | (France) Abdesselem Ben Mohammed |
| FW | (France) Edouard Kargulewicz |
| FW | (France) André Doye |
Manager:
(France) André Gérard

== See also ==
- 1954–55 Coupe de France
