= 1945 Coupe de France final =

- Event: 1944–45 Coupe de France
| RC Paris | Lille |
| 3 | 0 |
- Date: 6 May 1945
- Venue: Olympique Yves-du-Manoir, Colombes
- Referee: Georges Capdeville
- Attendance: 49,983

The 1945 Coupe de France final was a football match held at Stade Olympique Yves-du-Manoir, Colombes on 6 May 1945, that saw RC Paris defeat Lille OSC 3–0 thanks to goals by André Philippot, Pierre Ponsetti and Oscar Heisserer.

== Match details ==
6 May 1945

| RC Paris | 3–0 | Lille |
|---|---|---|
| Philippot 30'; Ponsetti 40'; Heisserer 65' |

Stade Olympique Yves-du-Manoir, Colombes
Attendance: 49,983
Referee: Georges Capdeville

| GK | (Spain) José Molinuevo |
| DF | (France) Maurice Dupuis |
| DF | (France) Marcel Salva |
| DF | (France) Jean-Claude Samuel |
| DF | (France) (Austria) Auguste Jordan | (c) |
| MF | (France) Lucien Jasseron |
| MF | (France) André Philippot |
| FW | (France) Oscar Heisserer |
| FW | (France) Emile Bongiorni |
| FW | (France) Pierre Ponsetti |
| FW | (France) Ernest Vaast |
Manager:
(France) Paul Baron Assistant Referees: Fourth Official:

| GK | (France) Julien Darui |
| DF | (France) Joseph Jadrejak |
| DF | (France) Jean Cardon |
| DF | (France) François Bourbotte | (c) |
| DF | (France) Casimir Stefaniak |
| MF | (France) Jules Bigot |
| MF | (France) Roger Vandooren |
| FW | (France) Jean Baratte |
| FW | (France) René Bihel |
| FW | (France) Roger Carré |
| FW | (France) Jean Lechantre |
Manager:
(England) Bill Berry

== See also ==
- 1944–45 Coupe de France
