= 1946 Coupe de France final =

Football match

- Event: 1945–46 Coupe de France
Lille	Red Star
4	2
- Date: 26 May 1946
- Venue: Olympique Yves-du-Manoir, Colombes
- Referee: Pierre Virolle
- Attendance: 59,692

The 1946 Coupe de France final was a football match held at Stade Olympique Yves-du-Manoir, Colombes on 26 May 1946, that saw Lille OSC defeat Red Star OA 4–2 thanks to goals by Bolek Tempowski, René Bihel and Roger Vandooren (2).

== Match details ==
26 May 1946

Lille	4–2	Red Star
Tempowski 13'; Bihel 24'; Vandooren 51', 85'		Moulet 24'; Leduc 69'

Stade Olympique Yves-du-Manoir, Colombes
Attendance: 59,692
Referee: Pierre Virolle

GK	(France) Georges Hatz
DF	(France) Joseph Jadrejak
DF	(France) Marceau Sommerlynck
DF	(France) François Bourbotte	(c)
DF	(France) Jean-Marie Prevost
MF	(France) Roger Carré
MF	(France) Roger Vandooren
FW	(France) Jean Baratte
FW	(France) René Bihel
FW	(France) (Poland) Bolek Tempowski
FW	(France) Jean Lechantre
Manager:
(France) André Cheuva Assistant Referees: Fourth Official:

GK	(France) Robert Germain
DF	(France) Fernand Planques
DF	(France) Justo Nuevo
DF	(France) Paul Bersouillé	(c)
DF	(France) Roger Mindonnet
MF	(France) Lucien Leduc
MF	(France) Alfred Aston
FW	(France) Ben Mohammed Kadmiri
FW	(France) (Hungary) André Simonyi
FW	(France) René Lotzia
FW	(France) Albert Moulet
Manager:
(France) Edmond Delfour

== See also ==
- 1945–46 Coupe de France
