= Bourbotte =

Bourbotte is a surname. Notable people with the surname include:

- François Bourbotte (1913–1972), French footballer
- Gérard Bourbotte (1934–2016), French footballer
- Pierre Bourbotte (1763–1795), French politician
