= Jean-Claude Samuel =

French footballer

Personal information
- Date of birth: 11 November 1924
- Place of birth: Guelma, Algeria
- Date of death: 2 August 2015 (aged 90)
- Place of death: Langon, Gironde, France
- Position: Midfielder

Senior career*
Years	Team	Apps	(Gls)
?–1943	JS Guelma		
1943–1944	RU Alger		
1944–1952	RC Paris		
1952–1954	Olympique Lyonnais		

International career
1945	France	3	(0)
- * Club domestic league appearances and goals

Jean-Claude Samuel (11 November 1924 – 2 August 2015) was a French footballer who played as a midfielder for RC Paris and the French national team in the 1940s.

== Playing career ==
=== Club career ===
Born on 11 November 1924 in Guelma, Algeria, Samuel began his football career at his hometown clubs JS Guelma and RU Alger, from which he joined RC Paris in 1944, aged 20. He made an immediate impact on the team because in his first season there, together with José Luis Molinuevo, Auguste Jordan, and Ernest Vaast, he helped the club win the 1944–45 Coupe de France final, beating Lille 3–0 in the final. He remained loyal to Racing for eight years, from 1944 until 1952, when he joined Olympique Lyonnais, where he retired two years later, in 1954, aged 30.

=== International career ===
On 26 May 1945, just 20 after winning the Coupe de France, Samuel earned his first international cap for France in a friendly match against England at Wembley Stadium, which ended in a 2–2 draw. In doing so, Samuel, then a pied-noir of the Air Force, became one of the last amateur players to represent the French national team. He played a further two matches for France, both in December 1945, which ended in defeats to Austria and Belgium.

== Death ==
Samuel died in Langon, Gironde, on 2 August 2015, at the age of 90.

== Honours ==
RC Paris

- Coupe de France:
  - Champions (1): 1944–45
