= René Fatoux =

French footballer (1935–2022)

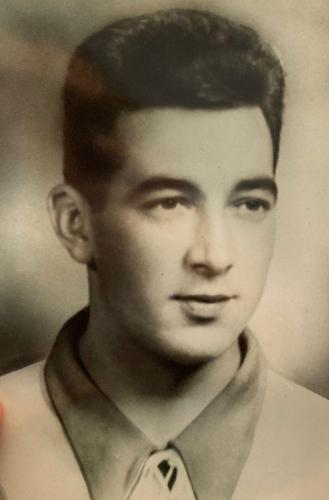
- Fatoux with Lille

Personal information
- Date of birth: 2 December 1935
- Place of birth: Dainville, France
- Date of death: 30 October 2022 (aged 86)
- Place of death: Warlus, Pas-de-Calais, France
- Height: 1.68 m (5 ft 6 in)
- Position: Forward

Senior career*
Years	Team	Apps	(Gls)
1957–1962	Lille	131	(68)
1963–1964	Red Star	2	(2)
1964–1965	RC Arras		
1965–1966	SO Chambéry		
1966–1967	Marignane		
1966–1967	Grenoble		
- * Club domestic league appearances and goals

René Fatoux (2 December 1935 – 30 October 2022) was a French footballer who played as a forward.

== Biography ==
Fatoux's club career began when he was aged 13 in Péronne. He then began training in Lens before joining Reims, where he played alongside Raymond Kopa and Albert Batteux. From 1956 to 1958, he was a part of the Bataillon de Joinville, where he won the Kentish Challenge Cup multiple times.

In his professional career, Fatoux played for Lille, Red Star, RC Arras, SO Chambéry, and Grenoble. He finished his career with Boiry as a player-coach when he was 50 years old. In addition to his football career, he was a physical education teacher. He received the Bronze Medal of Youth, Sports and Community Involvement in 2010. That year, he began coaching the youth team of AC Cambrai.

René Fatoux died in Warlus, Pas-de-Calais on 30 October 2022, at the age of 86.
