= Roland Clauws =

French footballer (1933–2004)

Personal information
- Full name: Roland Julien Clauws
- Date of birth: 6 December 1933
- Place of birth: Lomme, France
- Date of death: 13 April 2004 (aged 70)
- Place of death: Lille, France
- Height: 1.71 m (5 ft 7 in)
- Position: Midfielder

Youth career
- Iris Club Lambersart

Senior career*
Years	Team	Apps	(Gls)
1953–1960	Lille	134	(4)
1961–1962	Lens	34	(0)
1962–1964	Lille	50	(4)
1965–1969	Cambrai		
Total		218+	(8+)
- * Club domestic league appearances and goals

Roland Julien Clauws (6 December 1933 – 13 April 2004) was a French professional footballer who played as a midfielder.

== Honours ==
Lille

- Division 1: 1953–54
- Division 2: 1963–64
- Coupe de France: 1954–55
- Coupe Charles Drago runner-up: 1954, 1956
