= Patrick Collot =

French footballer and manager (born 1967)

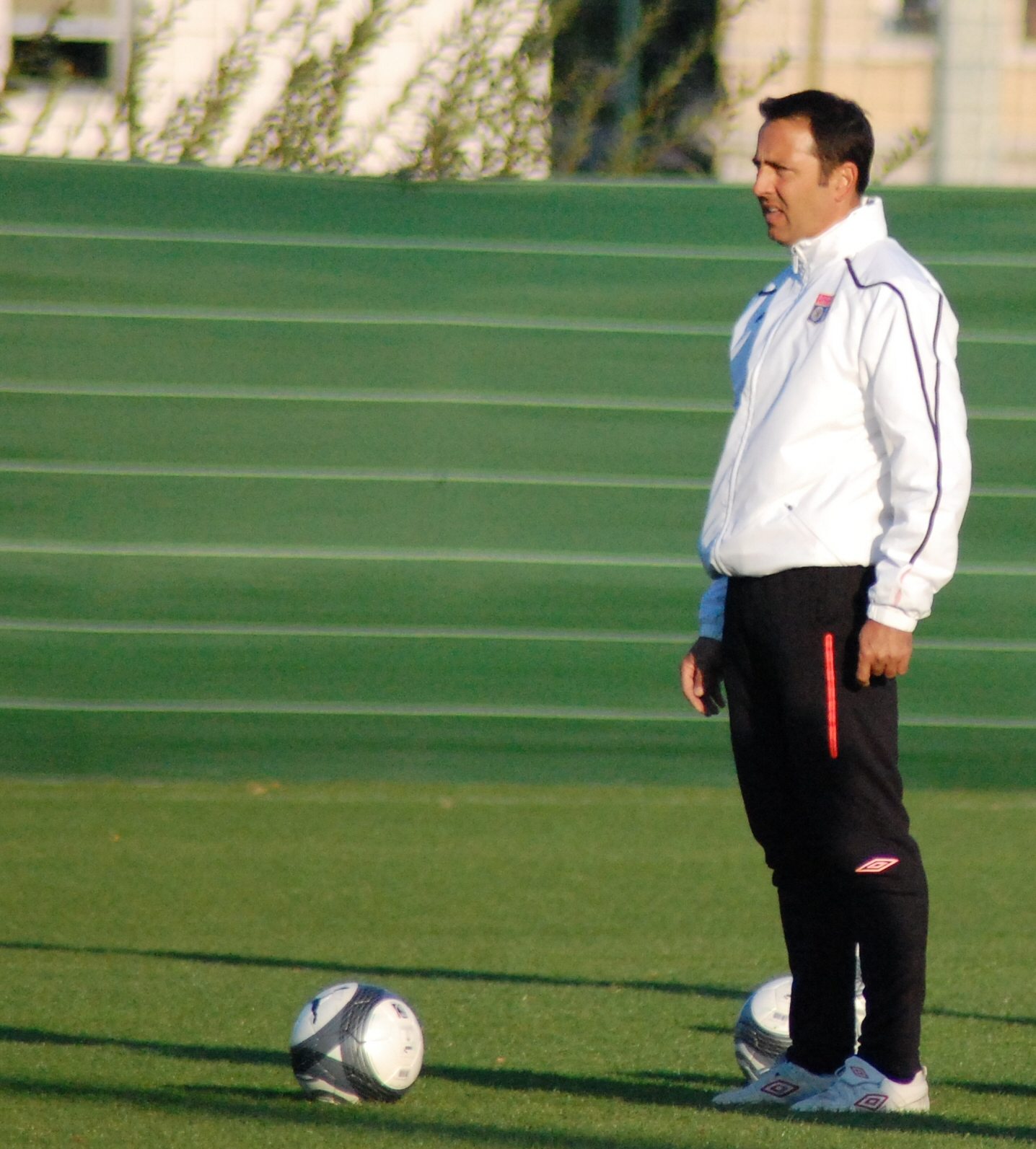
- Collot in 2009

Personal information
- Date of birth: 22 June 1967 (age 59)
- Place of birth: Avignon, France
- Height: 1.76 m (5 ft 9 in)
- Position: Midfielder

Team information
- Current team: Nantes (caretaker)

Senior career*
Years	Team	Apps	(Gls)
1987–1990	Toulon	61	(8)
1990–1991	Avignon	30	(7)
1991–1993	Toulon	27	(5)
1993–1995	Martigues	49	(8)
1995–2002	Lille	176	(17)

Managerial career
- 2007–2015: Lille (assistant)
- 2015: Lille (caretaker)
- 2016–2017: Lille (caretaker)
- 2018–: Nantes (assistant)
- 2019: Nantes (caretaker)
- 2020: Nantes (caretaker)
- * Club domestic league appearances and goals

Patrick Collot (French: [patʁik kɔlo]; born 22 June 1967) is a French football manager and former professional player, who played as a midfielder, who is the assistant coach of Ligue 2 club Nantes.
