= Jacques Debelleix =

French footballer (1934–2012)

Personal information
- Date of birth: 13 March 1934
- Place of birth: Caudéran, France
- Date of death: 29 September 2012 (aged 78)
- Place of death: Saint-Macaire, France
- Height: 1.83 m (6 ft 0 in)
- Position: Centre-back

Youth career
- –1954: Coqs Rouges Bordeaux

Senior career*
Years	Team	Apps	(Gls)
1954–1957	Bordeaux	55	(1)
1957–1961	Lille	109	(0)
1961–1962	Bordeaux	21	(0)
1962–1963	Lille	22	(0)
1963–1967	Concarneau		
Total		207+	(1+)

Managerial career
- 1963–1967: Concarneau
- * Club domestic league appearances and goals

Jacques Debelleix (13 March 1934 – 29 September 2012) was a French professional footballer who played as a centre-back.

== Honours ==
Bordeaux

- Coupe de France runner-up: 1954–55
