= Jean Van Gool =

French footballer (1931–1986)

Personal information
- Full name: Jean Charles Antoine Van Gool
- Date of birth: 28 January 1931
- Place of birth: Marquette-lez-Lille, France
- Date of death: 13 July 1986 (aged 55)
- Place of death: Lille, France
- Height: 1.81 m (5 ft 11 in)
- Position: Goalkeeper

Youth career
- 1953–1954: Lille

Senior career*
Years	Team	Apps	(Gls)
1954–1968	Lille	208	(0)
- * Club domestic league appearances and goals

Jean Charles Antoine Van Gool (28 January 1931 – 13 July 1986) was a French professional footballer who played as a goalkeeper.

== Honours ==
Lille

- Division 2: 1963–64
- Coupe de France: 1954–55
- Coupe Charles Drago runner-up: 1956
