= Arnaud Dos Santos =

French former footballer and coach (born 1945)

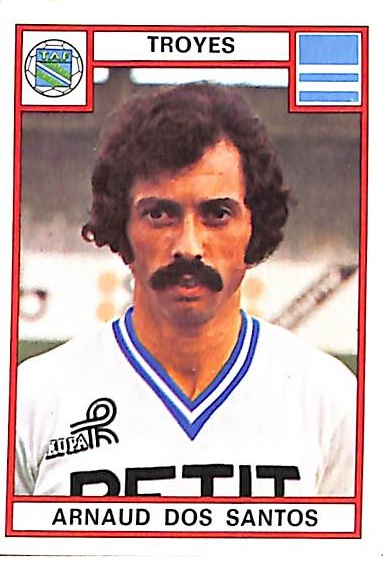

Personal information
- Date of birth: 19 September 1945 (age 81)
- Place of birth: Beautor, France
- Position: Midfielder

Senior career*
Years	Team	Apps	(Gls)
1964–1966	Boulogne	36	(10)
1966–1970	Rouen	120	(18)
1970–1972	Monaco	57	(9)
1972–1974	Bordeaux	72	(4)
1974–1976	Troyes	99	(8)
1976–1980	Lille	132	(16)

Managerial career
- 1982–1984: Lille
- 1984–1986: AS Beauvais
- 1986–1990: Rouen
- 1990–1992: Lens
- 1993–1994: FC Istres
- 1994–1998: Amiens
- 1999–2002: FC Istres
- 2012–2013: Royal Mouscron-Péruwelz
- * Club domestic league appearances and goals

Arnaud Dos Santos (born 19 September 1945) is a French former footballer and coach.

He played for US Boulogne, FC Rouen, AS Monaco FC, FC Girondins de Bordeaux, Troyes AC and Lille OSC.

After his playing career, he became a coach with Ligue 1 and Ligue 2 clubs, such as Lille OSC and RC Lens.
