= Abdelhamid Skander =

Algerian footballer (born 1928)

Personal information
- Date of birth: 13 May 1928 (age 98)
- Place of birth: Oran, French Algeria
- Height: 1.69 m (5 ft 7 in)
- Position: Left winger

Senior career*
Years	Team	Apps	(Gls)
1954–1956	Bordeaux	32	(8)
1956–1960	Rouen	104	(8)
Total		136	(16)
- * Club domestic league appearances and goals

Adelhamid Skander (Arabic: عبد الحميد اسكندر; born 13 May 1928) is an Algerian former professional footballer who played as a left winger.

== Honours ==
Bordeaux

- Coupe de France runner-up: 1954–55
