= Jules Bigot =

French footballer (1915–2007)

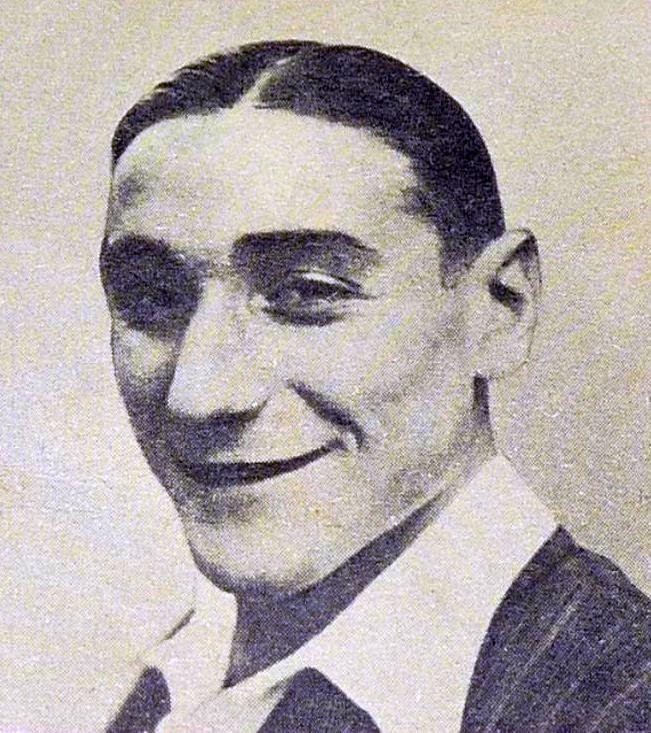
- Bigot in 1937

Personal information
- Date of birth: 22 October 1915
- Place of birth: Bully-les-Mines, France
- Date of death: 24 October 2007 (aged 92)
- Place of death: Lille, France
- Positions: Winger; striker

Youth career
- 1931–1933: Bully-les-Mines

Senior career*
Years	Team	Apps	(Gls)
1933–1939	Lille		
1939–1940	Marseille	0	(0)
1940–1943	Saint-Étienne		
1943–1944	EF Lille-Flandres		
1943–1950	Lille		
1950–1951	Le Havre		

International career
1936–1945	France	6	(1)

Managerial career
- 1950–1952: Le Havre
- 1952–1953: Rouen
- 1953–1958: Toulouse
- 1958–1962: Lens
- 1962–1963: Cercle Brugge
- 1963–1966: Lille
- 1966–1967: Gent
- 1969–1971: Mouscron
- * Club domestic league appearances and goals

Jules Bigot (French: [ʒyl biɡo]; 22 October 1915, Bully-les-Mines, Pas-de-Calais – 24 October 2007) was a French football player and manager. He played club football most notably with Lille; he was then manager in France and Belgium.
