= Warlus, Pas-de-Calais =

Warlus
- Commune
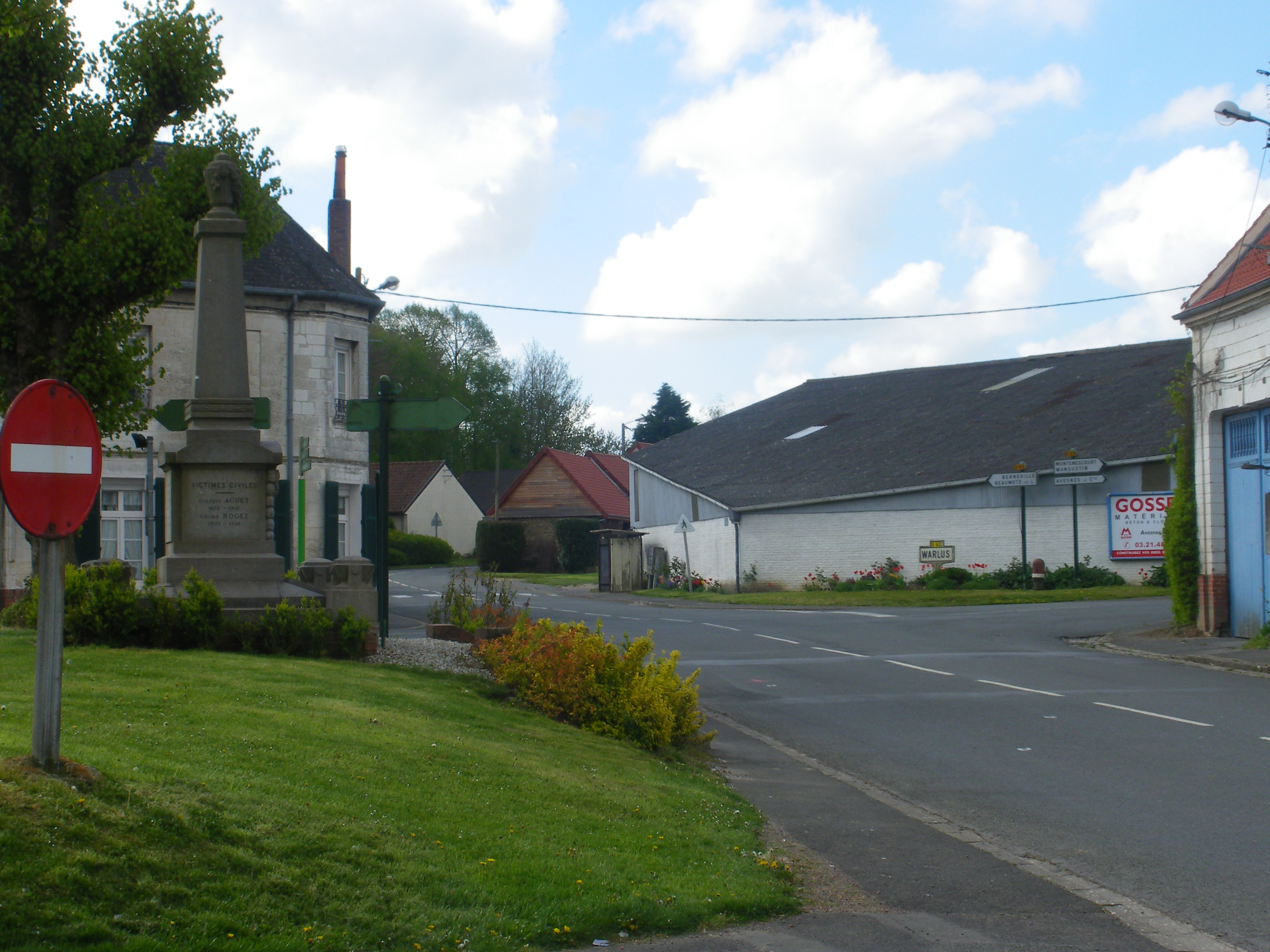
- The centre of Warlus

- Coat of arms
- Location of Warlus
- Location within France Location within Hauts-de-France
- Coordinates: 50°16′32″N 2°40′11″E
- Country: France
- Region: Hauts-de-France
- Department: Pas-de-Calais
- Arrondissement: Arras
- Canton: Avesnes-le-Comte
- Intercommunality: Campagnes de l'Artois

Government
  - Mayor (2020–2026): Catherine Libessart
- Area^{1}: 5.43 km^{2} (2.10 sq mi)
- Elevation: 97 m (318 ft)
- Highest elevation: 122 m (400 ft)
- Lowest elevation: 83 m (272 ft)
- Population (2023): 377
  - Density: 69.4/km^{2} (180/sq mi)
- Time zone: UTC+01:00 (CET)
  - Summer (DST): UTC+02:00 (CEST)
- INSEE/Postal code: 62878 /62123
- ^{1} French Land Register data, which excludes lakes, ponds, glaciers > 1 km^{2} (0.386 sq mi or 247 acres) and river estuaries.

Warlus is a commune in the Pas-de-Calais department in the Hauts-de-France region of France.

== Geography ==
Warlus is situated some 6 miles (9.7 km) southwest of Arras, at the junction of the D59 and the D62 roads.

== Population ==
Historical population
Year	Pop.	±% p.a.
1968	223	—
1975	221	−0.13%
1982	305	+4.71%
1990	385	+2.95%
1999	377	−0.23%
2007	364	−0.44%
2012	376	+0.65%
2017	377	+0.05%
2023	377	+0.00%
Source: INSEE

== Places of interest ==
- The church of St. Lambert, dating from the sixteenth century.
- Traces of an old castle.

== See also ==
- Communes of the Pas-de-Calais department
