= Simon Janczewski =

French footballer (1926–1989)

Personal information
- Full name: Zygmunt Janczewski
- Date of birth: 26 January 1926
- Place of birth: Reims, France
- Date of death: 5 January 1989 (aged 62)
- Place of death: Pessac, France
- Height: 1.74 m (5 ft 9 in)
- Position: Defender

Senior career*
Years	Team	Apps	(Gls)
1948–1953	Sochaux	122	(0)
1953–1957	Bordeaux	127	(1)
Total		249	(1)
- * Club domestic league appearances and goals

Zygmunt "Simon" Janczewski (26 January 1926 – 5 January 1989) was a French professional footballer who played as a defender.

== Honours ==
Sochaux

- Coupe Charles Drago: 1953

Bordeaux

- Coupe de France runner-up: 1954–55
