= Robert Germain =

Haitian politician (1933–2024)

Minister of Public Health
- In office 24 February 1984 – 10 June 1985
- Preceded by: Ary Bordes
- Succeeded by: Victor Laroche

Minister of Youth and Sport
- In office 27 August 1983 – 24 February 1984

Personal details
- Born: 1933 Pétion-Ville, Haiti
- Died: 21 June 2024 (aged 90)
- Occupation: Doctor; Schoolteacher

Robert Germain (1933 – 21 June 2024) was a Haitian politician. He served as Minister of Youth and Sport from 1983 to 1984 and Minister of Public Health from 1984 to 1985.

Germain died on 21 June 2024, at the age of 90.
