= José Luis Molinuevo =

Spanish footballer and manager

Personal information
- Full name: José Luis Molinuevo Martín
- Date of birth: January 22, 1917
- Place of birth: Deusto, Spain
- Date of death: 24 December 2002 (aged 85)
- Place of death: Gijón, Spain
- Position: Goalkeeper

Senior career*
Years	Team	Apps	(Gls)
- Athletic Bilbao
1942–1943	USAP Perpignan		
1943–1944	Montpellier		
1944–1947	RC Paris	70	(0)
1947–1950	Athletic Bilbao	13	(0)

Managerial career
- 1957–19??: Basconia
- Ourense
- 1962–1966: Sporting Gijón
- 1966–1967: Pontevedra
- 1967: Valladolid
- Ourense
- 19??–1972: Ensidesa
- * Club domestic league appearances and goals

José Luis Molinuevo Martín (22 January 1917 – 24 December 2002) was a Spanish football manager and player.

He played for Athletic Bilbao (two spells), USAP Perpignan, SO Montpellier and RC Paris.

He coached Baskonia KK, CD Ourense, Sporting de Gijón, Pontevedra CF, Real Valladolid and CD Ensidesa.
