= Jean Lechantre =

French-Belgian footballer (1922-2015)

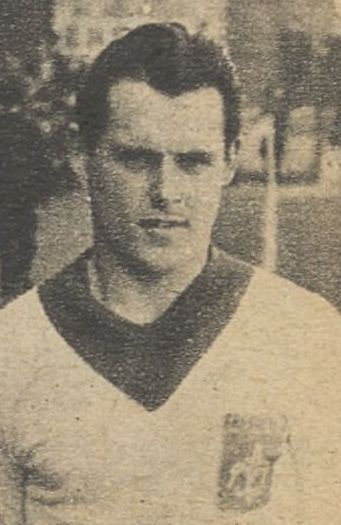
- Lechantre in 1947

Personal information
- Date of birth: 13 February 1922
- Place of birth: Taintignies, now parts of Rumes, Belgium
- Date of death: 12 February 2015 (aged 92)
- Place of death: Lille, France
- Position: Striker

Youth career
- Lille

Senior career*
| Years | Team | Apps | (Gls) |
| 1944–1952 | Lille | | |
| 1952–1955 | CO Roubaix-Tourcoing | 71 | (14) |
| 1955–1959 | AC Cambrai | | |
| 1959–1960 | CO Roubaix-Tourcoing | 10 | (2) |

International career
| 1947–1949 | France | 3 | (0) |

Managerial career
- 1955–1959: AC Cambrai
- 1959–1960: CO Roubaix-Tourcoing
- * Club domestic league appearances and goals

Jean Lechantre (13 February 1922 – 12 February 2015) was a footballer. He played club football most notably with Lille and CO Roubaix-Tourcoing. Born in Belgium, he was capped three times for France and ended his career as a player-coach for AC Cambrai and CO Roubaix-Tourcoing.

He acquired French nationality by naturalization on 21 November 1945.

== National team ==
He made his debut for France on 3 May 1947 against England in a friendly match. His second international match was also a friendly match, held two years later, on 13 November, against Czechoslovakia. His third and final international match was against Yugoslavia at a World Cup qualifier on 11 December 1949.
