= André Cheuva =

French footballer and manager (1908–1989)

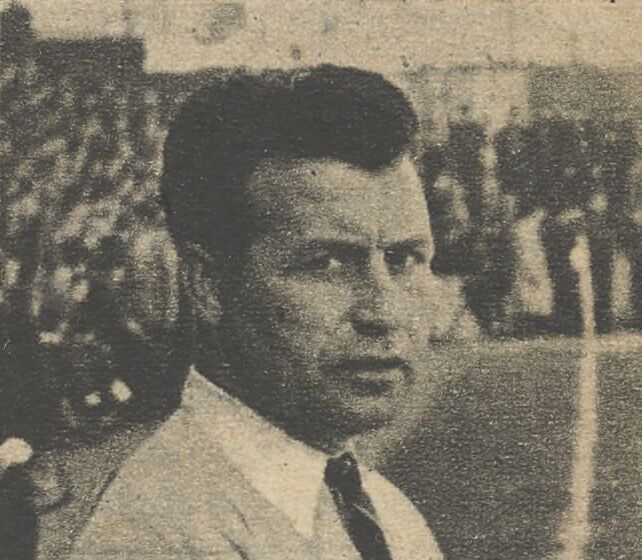
- Cheuva in 1947

Personal information
- Date of birth: 30 May 1908
- Place of birth: Hellemmes, France
- Date of death: 5 February 1989 (aged 80)
- Position: Midfielder

Senior career*
Years	Team	Apps	(Gls)
1932–1938	SC Fives		
1938–1939	Lille		

International career
1929–1936	France	7	(2)

Managerial career
- 1946–1958: Lille
- 1962–1966: Boulogne
- 1966–1968: Olympique Saint-Quentin
- 1968–1969: US Tourcoing
- * Club domestic league appearances and goals

André Cheuva (30 May 1908 – 5 February 1989) was a French footballer who played as a midfielder. After retiring, he became a manager, and won four Coupe de France with Lille.
