= Gérard Bourbotte =

French footballer (1934–2016)

Personal information
- Full name: Gérard Auguste Bourbotte
- Date of birth: 7 February 1934
- Place of birth: La Bassée, France
- Date of death: 25 June 2016 (aged 82)
- Place of death: Sailly-sur-la-Lys, France
- Height: 1.72 m (5 ft 8 in)
- Position: Forward

Senior career*
Years	Team	Apps	(Gls)
1952–1957	Lille	122	(53)
1957–1959	Strasbourg	41	(27)
1959–1960	Red Star	30	(17)
1960–1963	Stade Français	90	(28)
1963–1968	Lille	83	(16)
Total		366	(141)
- * Club domestic league appearances and goals

Gérard Auguste Bourbotte (7 February 1934 – 25 June 2016) was a French professional footballer who played as a forward. He is the third top scorer in the history of Lille.
