= Joseph Jadrejak =

Footballer (1918–1990)

Personal information
- Full name: Joseph Jadrzejczak
- Date of birth: 20 February 1918
- Place of birth: Gladbeck, Germany
- Date of death: 24 November 1990 (aged 72)
- Place of death: Saint-André-lez-Lille, France
- Position: Defender

Youth career
- 1930–1936: Houdain
- 1936–1937: Divion
- 1937–1939: Bruay

Senior career*
Years	Team	Apps	(Gls)
1939–1944	SC Fives		
1944–1950	Lille		

International career
1947	France	3	(0)

Managerial career
- 1969–1970: Lille
- * Club domestic league appearances and goals

Joseph Jadrzejczak, known as Joseph Jadrejak (20 February 1918 - 24 November 1990), was a football player and manager who played as a defender. He was part of the famed Lille team of the late 1940s. Born in Germany, he made three appearances for the France national team.

== Biography ==
Born in Gladbeck, Westphalia, Germany, Jadrejak moved to France with his family when he was two years old.

In the 1969–70 season, Jadrejak rejoined Lille as a manager, succeeding Daniel Langrand.

Jadrejak died in Saint-André-lez-Lille.

== Honours ==
Lille

- French champions: 1946
- Coupe de France: 1946, 1947, 1948

SC Fives

- Coupe de France runner-up: 1941
