= Lille OSC =

Association football club in France

Lille
- Full name: Lille Olympique Sporting Club
- Nicknames: Les Dogues (The Mastiffs); Les Nordistes (The Northmen); Les Lillois (The Lillois); La Machine de Guerre (The War Machine)
- Short name: LOSC; Lille OSC; LOSC Lille
- Founded: 23 September 1944; 82 years ago
- Stadium: Stade Pierre-Mauroy
- Capacity: 50,186 (Note: Initial capacity decreasing for club football matches/international fixtures due to home and away supporter segregation, and/or broadcast commentary position layout)
- Owner: Merlyn Partners
- President: Olivier Létang
- Head coach: Davide Ancelotti
- League: Ligue 1
- 2025–26: Ligue 1, 3rd of 18
- Website: losc.fr
Home colours	Away colours	Third colours

Lille Olympique Sporting Club (French pronunciation: [lil ɔlɛ̃pik spɔʁtɪŋ klœb]), commonly referred to as LOSC, LOSC Lille or simply Lille, is a professional football club based in Lille, Northern France competing in Ligue 1, the top division of French football. Lille have played their home matches since 2012 at the Stade Pierre-Mauroy. The 50,186-capacity retractable roof venue is the fourth-largest stadium in France.

Lille were founded as a result of a merger between Olympique Lillois and SC Fives in 1944. Both clubs were founding members of the French Division 1 and Olympique Lillois were the league's inaugural champions. The club's most successful period was the decade from 1946 to 1955, in the post-war period, when the first-team won seven major trophies, including a league/cup double in 1946, and was known as La Machine de Guerre (French for "The War Machine"). Having won another double in 2011, their fourth league title in 2021 as well as their first Trophée des Champions (Note: French equivalent to a super cup) the same year, Lille are the fourth best French club in the 21st century.

In domestic football, the club has won a total of four league titles, six Coupes de France and one Trophée des Champions since its foundation. In European football, Lille have participated in the UEFA Champions League ten times, reaching the knockout phase three times, competed in the UEFA Europa League on nine occasions and got to the UEFA Conference League quarter-finals once. They also won the UEFA Intertoto Cup in 2004 after finishing as runners-up in 2002. Lille are also one of the few clubs, still in the first division, to have at least 15 final top-three appearances (Note: Aggregate seasons in which a club is crowned champion, finished as runner-up or in third place) in the history of the French championship.

Nicknamed Les Dogues (French for "The Mastiffs"), Lille are known for their academy which has produced and trained notable graduates. Throughout their history, they have cultivated a reputation for scouting and developing young players. Lille is the best club in the world regarding the financial balance of transfers concerning non-academy players signed since 2015, according to the CIES Football Observatory. They have a long-standing rivalry with nearby side Lens, in which Lille lead in the head-to-head record and in terms of total trophies won. Chaired by Olivier Létang, they are the fifth-most followed French sports club on social media.

== History ==
=== First decade of glory : The War Machine (1944–1955) ===
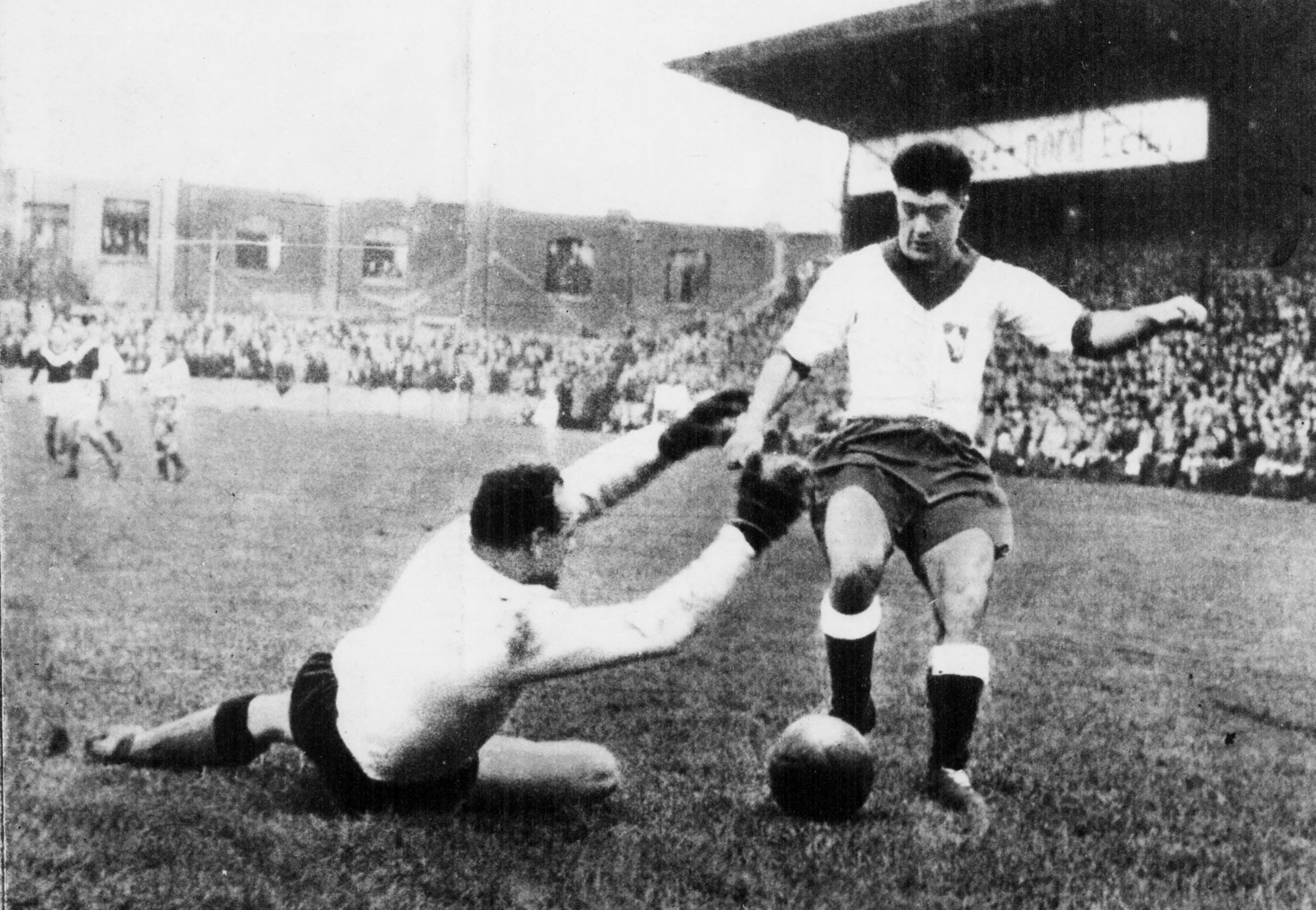
Roger Vandooren with Lille against Strasbourg in 1946

Before the Second World War, the city of Lille had two clubs at the top level; Olympique Lillois and SC Fives. Olympique Lillois were crowned domestic champions in 1932–33, the first in the history of the championship that was created in 1932, and were runners-up in 1935–36. They also earned a USFSA Football Championship title in 1914, the French football top division before the creation of the French Division 1, and went to the Coupe de France final in 1939. Their neighbours, SC Fives, ranked second in 1933–34. They also went to the Coupe de France final, being defeated by Girondins AS Port in 1941. Weakened by the war, the two clubs decided to merge in the autumn of 1944, on 23 September, giving birth to Stade Lillois, renamed Lille Olympique Sporting Club a few weeks later. On 25 November 1944, the club is officially registered under its new name.

For its first season, the newborn club reached the 1945 Coupe de France Final, with a squad composed of the best players of both merging teams, who are mostly natives of the Nord department. Next season, Lille won the double, beating Red Star in the 1946 Coupe de France Final and finishing at the first place of French Division 1 ahead of Saint-Étienne and Roubaix-Tourcoing. In 1947, Lille finished in the fourth place but came back to the Coupe de France final and retained the trophy, defeating Strasbourg. The club won the cup again in 1948 beating main rivals Lens, its third in a row, and were runners-up of the league the same year, behind Marseille that became the champions after a strong 1947–48 season finishing. They were also runners-up in 1948–49, 1949–50 and 1950–51. On 24 June 1951, an exhausted Lille reached the Latin Cup final and lost against Gre-No-Li's AC Milan after having played 250 minutes in the span of two days.

On 31 May 1953, they got back to winning and earned their fourth Coupe de France trophy in a 2–1 final win against FC Nancy, before 60,000 spectators. The club then won its second domestic title in 1953–54, having only conceded 22 goals within 34 games. After this season, Lille is praised for its defensive proficiency and acquired a reputation as a rock-solid defense. A year later, Les Dogues earned their fifth Coupe de France in a 5–2 win against Bordeaux in the final. This period of glory and hegemony, occurring after the war and the German occupation of France, has led to one of the club's nicknames: La Machine de Guerre (French for "The War Machine"). Within its first decade of existence, the club gathered the vast majority of its major trophies, winning two league titles and reaching the second place for four consecutive seasons. Lille, known as the best French club in the post-war period, accumulated five Coupe de France wins in seven finals, including five successive finals and winning the trophy three times in a row, one of the best performances in the history of the tournament.

=== Decline and several spells in lower levels (1955–1978) ===
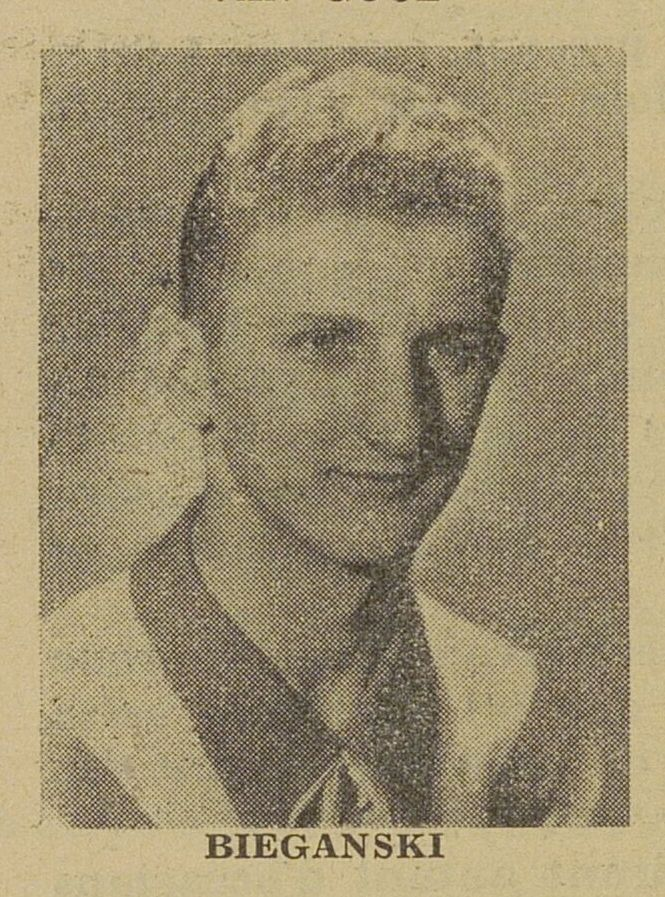
Guillaume Bieganski, one of the best Lille players in the late 1950s

The 1955–56 season happened to be highly complicated. The club suffered from internal conflicts, Louis Henno was contested and certain players refused to play some matches. In the field, the Northmen were way too irregular and crumbly in defense, and finished in 16th place. Lille were relegated for the first time in their history in 1956. This relegation is accompanied by aggravating financial consequences. Best players' departure is necessary to cover debts which are becoming substantial. Failing to rebuild a top team due to the increasingly poor financial situation, the club began a series of promotions and relegations. Promoted in 1957 by beating Rennes, Lille initially ended up to an unexpected 6th place. The club then finished in eighteenth place the following season; being relegated a second time. After a few years spent in Division 2, the club became a mid-table side in the late 1960s. From 1964 to 1968, the club managed somehow to avoid relegation to the lower level. After a long drought, the worst occurred when Lille abandoned its professional status on 23 June 1969, lacking facilities and resources.

A few seasons spent in amateur leagues later, Lille recreated its professional team by entering the second division in 1970, finished at the top of the division at the end of the season. The club began a new series of promotions and relegations in the 1970s. During this decade, the club's accounts were largely in deficit. To cover debts, a support committee was founded and friendly matches were organized to raise funds. Famous clubs like Marseille or Feyenoord as well as nearby Belgian teams like Anderlecht and Standard Liège agreed to play against Lille to help the northern team. However, these ticket revenues only temporarily improve the club's financial situation but the Lille city council was again forced to help and intervene. At the lower level, Lille missed out on promotion in 1973 by one point but were crowned Division 2 champions the following year. After finishing twice in 13th place, during the 1974–75 and 1975–76 seasons, the club was once again relegated in 1977.

=== Reconstruction and reorganization (1978–2000) ===
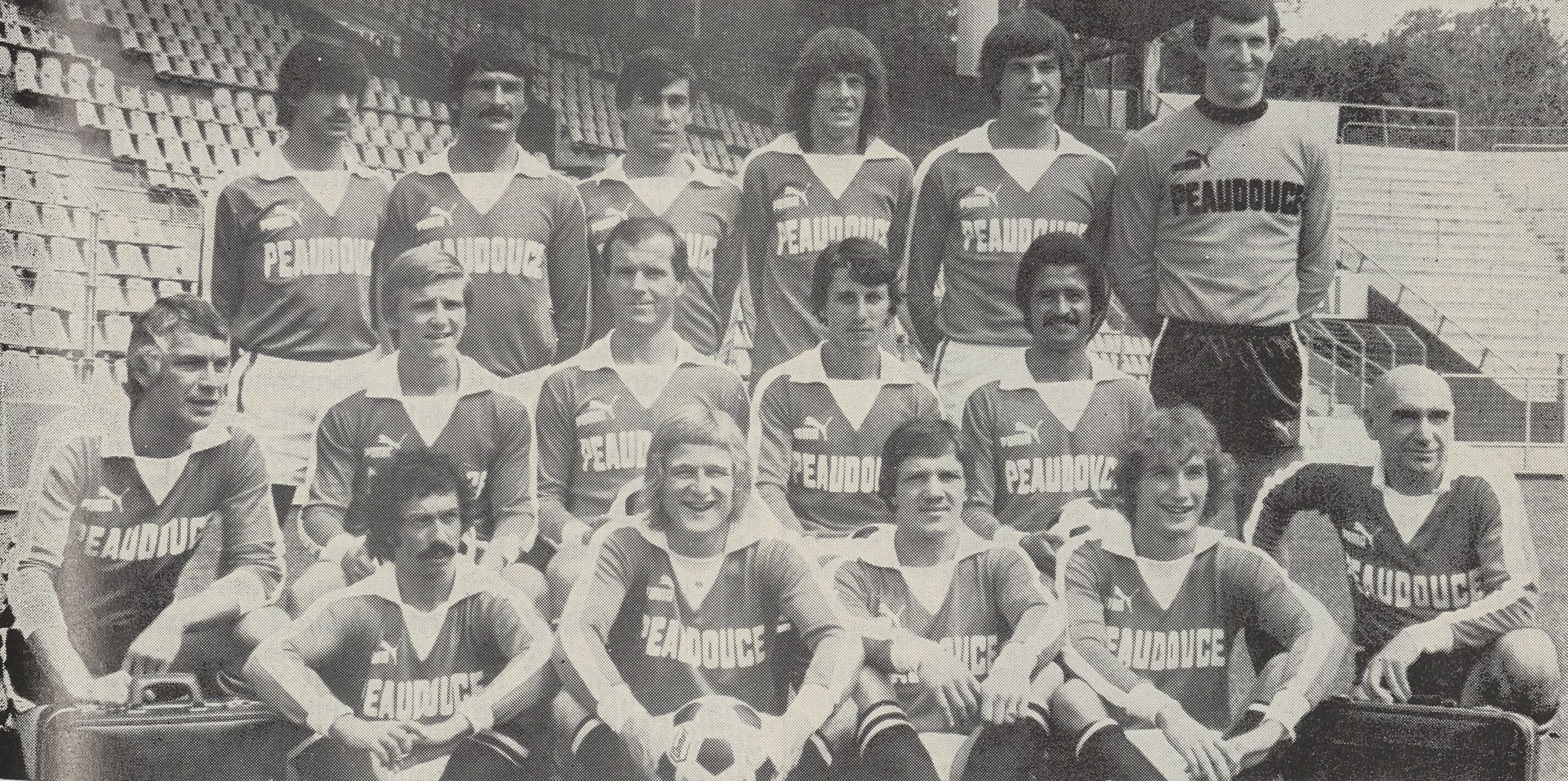
Lille squad for 1979–80 French Division 1 season

After years of back and forth, Lille finally returned to the top tier of French football at the end of the 1977–78 season. Until 1997, the club remained in the first division, becoming a perennial member of the Division 1. In the 1978–79, the Mastiffs had a good run and ended at 6th place, nearly qualifying for European competitions while being promoted. The following year, in July 1980, Lille was the first French club to opt for the status of a mixed economy company (SAEMS), of which the city of Lille became the majority shareholder and turned the club into a public-controlled enterprise. The new financial sustainability allows the club's sporting stabilization in the elite division. LOSC then achieved some success stories in the decade, reaching the Coupe de France semi-finals in 1983 and 1985.

However, presidents Jacques Amyot, Roger Deschodt and Jacques Dewailly all struggled to compete with the top teams in the country and saw Lille staying in the familiar surroundings of mid-table. In 1991, Lille then-coached by Jacques Santini finished in sixth place, just two points from the European places; this is the club's only appearance in the league table top half in the 1990s. After financial problems, Bernard Lecomte took over as president of the club in 1994 and saved it from administrative relegation the following year by negotiating with the governing bodies. During this period of austerity where the National Football League prohibited the club from recruiting, LOSC had to part ways with its star players, such as Antoine Sibierski or Miladin Bečanović, and chose to develop its youth academy. Yet another economic crisis brought the club to the brink of bankruptcy and led to relegation to the second division in 1997.

While being in Division 2, the club was privatised and purchased in 1999 by Luc Dayan and Francis Graille. The team then trained by Bosnian coach Vahid Halilhodžić reconnected with success. Lille quickly recovered as Lille were head and shoulders over the other clubs during the 1999–2000 Division 2 season, the club dominated the championship thanks to excellent defense and finished champion with sixteen points ahead of its runner-up, being promoted back to the top.

=== Back to the top and new double (2000–2017) ===
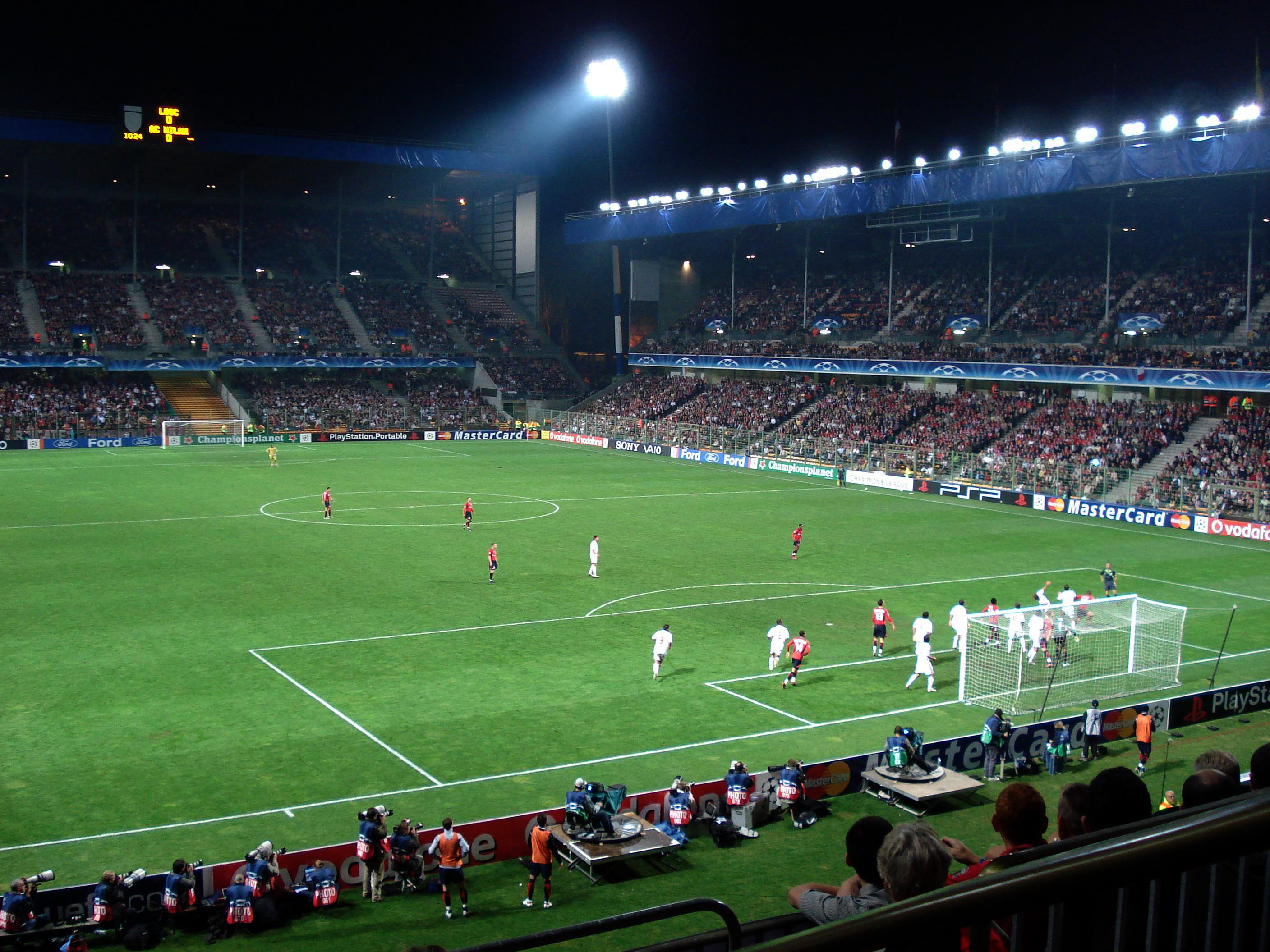
Lille playing against AC Milan in the 2006–07 UEFA Champions League

In just its first season back in the top flight 2000–01 French Division 1, Lille qualified for Europe for the first time in the club's history, booking its place in the 2001–02 Champions League. On the back of the club's new status, Lille entered into a decisive new era under the guidance of chairman and chief executive officer Michel Seydoux and coach Claude Puel. The club left the historical Stade Grimonprez-Jooris to join the Stadium Lille Métropole and became a regular on the European scene. Amongst its most emphatic results was the 1–0 victory over Manchester United at the Stade de France in 2005, the 2–0 triumph over Milan in San Siro in 2006 and the 1–0 home win over Liverpool in 2010.

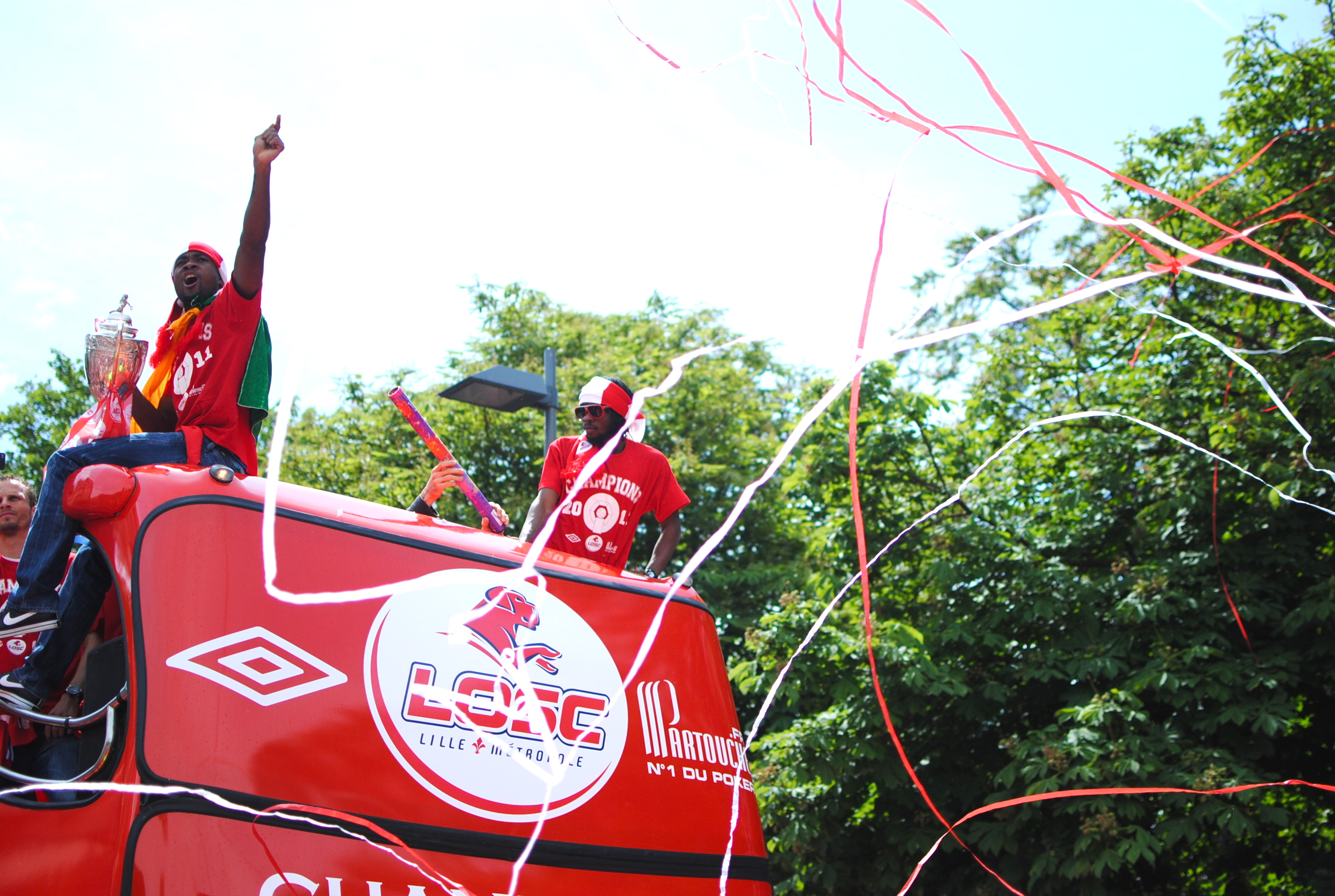
Aurélien Chedjou and Gervinho celebrate winning the double in 2011.

In the 2010s, Lille developed on and off the pitch, and established as an important club in French Ligue 1. First, the inauguration of the Domaine de Luchin training complex in 2007, the center being one of the largest in France. Roughly at the same time, the construction of the 50,000-capacity Grand Stade Lille Métropole (renamed later Stade Pierre-Mauroy), which opened in 2012, began on 29 March 2010 and will give the club the fourth-largest football stadium in France. Rudi Garcia took the club back to the top of the French league. Fifty-six years after the club's last trophy, 2010–11 first-team, led by Yohan Cabaye, Mathieu Debuchy and Eden Hazard, won the club's second double after finishing at the 2010–11 Ligue 1 top spot and defeating Paris Saint-Germain in the 2011 Coupe de France Final.

In the 2011–12 and 2012–13 Ligue 1 seasons, Lille confirmed its place belong top French football teams, finishing successively at the second and sixth places and qualifying for the 2012–13 Champions League. In 2013, Garcia left to join Roma, while former Montpellier coach René Girard was appointed as new manager. Under Girard, Lille finished at the third place in 2013–14, behind Zlatan Ibrahimović's Paris Saint-Germain and James Rodríguez's Monaco. After two years in charge of the club and a deceiving eight seed at the end of the 2014–15 Ligue 1 season, Girard left the club by mutual consent.

In May 2015, the Ivory Coast national team head coach Hervé Renard was appointed as the new manager. On 11 November 2015, Renard was terminated as manager and was replaced by Frederic Antonetti. On 23 November 2016, a year after being appointed, Lille terminated Antonetti's contract with the club lying second last in the table.

=== Campos and Galtier era: sustained success (2017–2021) ===
In early 2017, Lille appointed Luís Campos as sporting director and head of recruitment. A short time afterwards, the club announced the arrival of Argentine famous manager Marcelo Bielsa. In November 2017, Bielsa was suspended by Lille following an unauthorized trip to Chile with the club lying second from bottom on the table again and only managing 3 wins from the first 14 games of the season. On 23 December 2017, Bielsa was terminated by Lille and replaced with former Saint-Etienne manager Christophe Galtier. In a difficult 2017–18 season, Lille managed to avoid relegation to Ligue 2 by defeating Toulouse 3–2 in the second last game of the campaign.

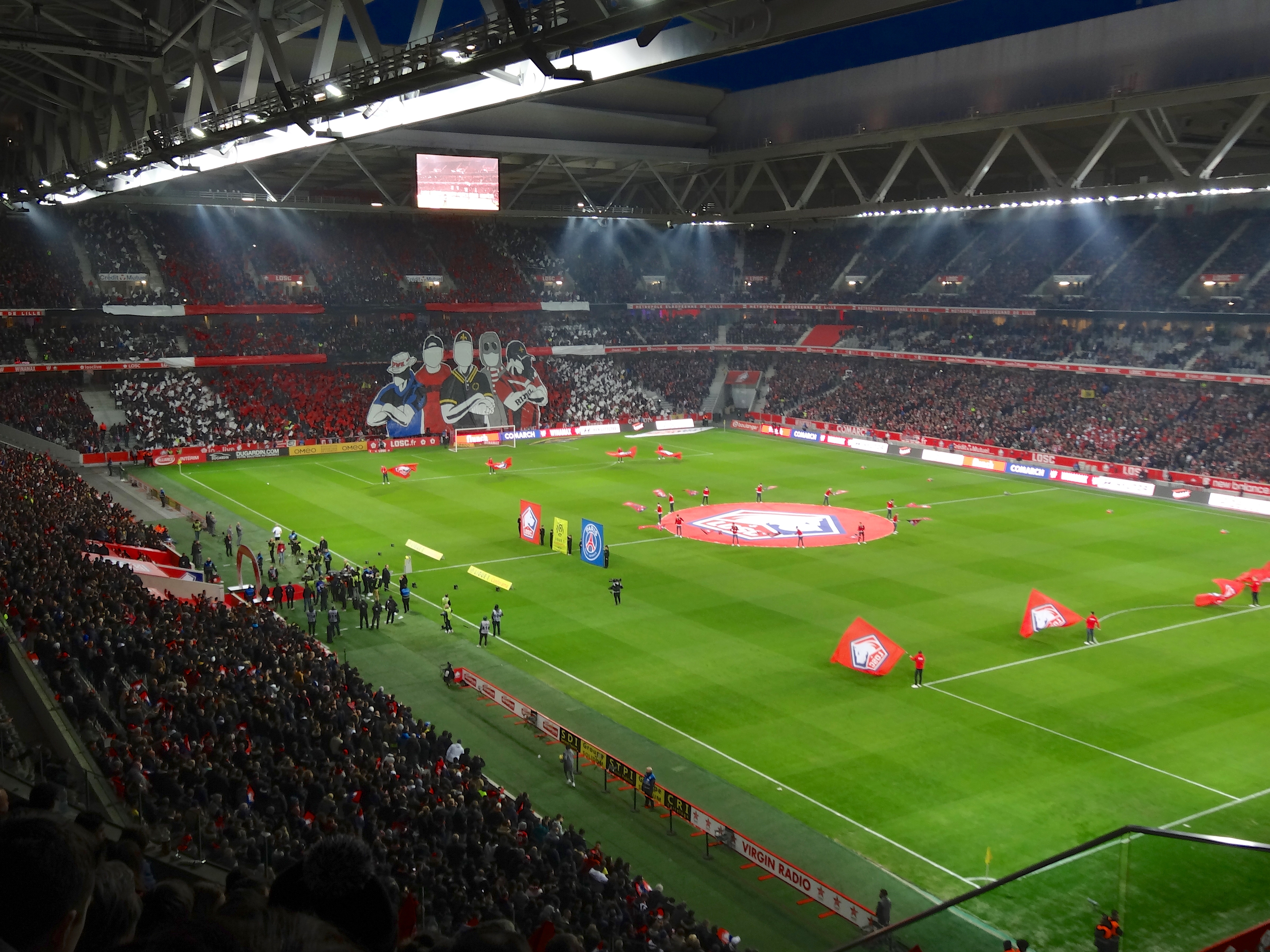
A crowded Stade Pierre-Mauroy before Lille's 5–1 win over Paris Saint-Germain on 14 April 2019

Lille's following season is completely different. After the arrivals of veterans José Fonte and Loïc Rémy, Turkish right-back Zeki Çelik and forwards Jonathan Bamba, Jonathan Ikoné and Rafael Leão, the team proceeded to reel off a string of victories, losing only five games in the first part of the 2018–19 Ligue 1 season. On 14 April 2019, before a record attendance of 49,712 spectators, they defeated Paris Saint-Germain in a historic and storming 5–1 home win with goals from Nicolas Pépé, Jonathan Bamba, Gabriel and team captain José Fonte. At the end of the season, Lille secured the second place to qualify for the 2019–20 UEFA Champions League group stage; they returned to the competition after a seven-year absence. On 1 August 2019, club's season-top scorer Nicolas Pépé is sold to Premier League side Arsenal in a club-record fee of €80 million (£72 million). Lille announced the recruitment of Victor Osimhen and Tiago Djaló on the same day, after the signings of Timothy Weah, Reinildo Mandava and Benjamin André a few weeks earlier. The club then announced the arrivals of Yusuf Yazıcı and Renato Sanches to strengthen the midfield. In early March 2020, the Northmen were in 4th place with 49 points after 28 rounds. However, the Ligue 1 season ended abruptly as the LFP first suspended domestic leagues indefinitely following the outbreak of COVID-19 in France on 13 March, and then definitely cancelled French football competitions a month and a half later.

In the 2020 summer transfer window, Lille chose to sign young talents Sven Botman and Jonathan David as well as veteran Burak Yılmaz. At the end of the 2020–21 season first half, Lille had only lost two games and was well installed in the top league rankings, having defeated Derby du Nord rivals Lens in a 4–0 home win on 18 October 2020. The Mastiffs started the second part of the season with a six-game winning streak and lost only once until the end. On 3 April 2021, Lille won at Paris with a Jonathan David goal and took over sole possession of first place in the league. Three weeks later, Lille came back from two goals down to beat Lyon at Groupama Stadium as Burak Yılmaz scored twice including a 27-yard free kick in a breathtaking 3–2 away win. Lille then defeated local rivals once again, scoring three goals at Lens and prevailing in the season with an aggregate score of 7–0. On 23 May, Lille sealed the Ligue 1 title with a 2–1 victory at Angers after a dramatic Ligue 1 final round and won its fourth Ligue 1 title under the guidance of manager Christophe Galtier. At the end of the season, goalkeeper Mike Maignan finished the season with 21 clean sheets, one short of the league season all-time record. Competing also in the 2020–21 UEFA Europa League, they defeated AC Milan at San Siro, on 5 November 2020, in a big 3–0 away win with a hat-trick from Yusuf Yazıcı, but lost to Ajax in round of 32.

=== Further stages and European maturity (2021–present) ===
In the 2021–22 season, Lille won its first Trophée des Champions, defeating Paris Saint-Germain with a Xeka goal at Bloomfield Stadium in Tel Aviv, Israel on 1 August 2021. The Northmen then reached UEFA Champions League round of 16 and are defeated by Chelsea, after qualifying from the group stage against Salzburg, Sevilla and Wolfsburg. According to an analysis report published at the end of the Ligue 1 season, Lille is the fourth best French club in Ligue 1, in the 21st century, behind Paris Saint-Germain, Lyon and Marseille.

On 29 June 2022, the club appointed Paulo Fonseca as new head coach of the first-team. The 2022–23 season started very well for the Northmen as they defeated Auxerre, on 7 August, in a 4–1 home win. On 9 October, they defeated close rivals Lens in a 1–0 home win. Being one of the best offensive teams in the league, Fonseca's Lille is praised for its stylish, slick passing game and its attacking system. Since the beginning of the season, Lille have played in an open, offensive 4–2–3–1 formation with Benjamin André, André Gomes or Angel Gomes playing as central midfielders behind playmaker Rémy Cabella and lone striker Jonathan David. Following 4–3 home win over Monaco on 23 October, only Lyon and Paris Saint-Germain have had more possession in France in the 2022–23 Ligue 1 season.

== Identity and colours ==
=== Crest and nicknames ===
Crest of Olympique Lillois

Crest of SC Fives

Lille's crest has changed many times. The first crest of the newborn club was simply the escutcheon of the city of Lille dating from 1235 that shows an argent-on-gules fleur-de-lys. The fleur-de-lys refers to the name and the insularity of the city. "Lille", or "Lile" and "Lysle" depending on the past forms, is phonetically close to "Lisle", an old spelling of "Lys". The lys also makes reference to the water flag, which were rife through the marshes surrounding the city. The colours of the heraldry, argent (white) and gules (red), embody wisdom and wealth for the first one, and passion and faithfulness for the second.

White and red were the colours of Olympique Lillois while blue, traditional colour of the team shorts, refers to SC Fives and is also present in the first-ever club crest from 1946. Red remains the main colour used by the club in its imagery, on its website or its social media.

The club adopted the colours of his founding and merging parents, and the fleur-de-lys symbol that can be seen in the first badges. In 1981, the mastiff appeared for the first time in the club crest and has never left it. The nickname, Les Dogues (French for "The Mastiffs"), evokes and emphasizes the team's aggressiveness and dedication, and was first used in the 1920s for Olympique Lillois players. This nickname seems to have appeared for the first time in the now-defunct newspaper Le Télégramme du Nord (French for "The North Telegram") on 10 November 1919. Olympique Lillois started to officially use it in the club's press releases a few weeks later. Other nicknames or designations are frequently used, like Les Nordistes (French for "The Northmen") or Les Lillois (French pronunciation: [lilwa]), the demonym corresponding to Lille.

In 1989, a new crest was unveiled which combines the fleur-de-lys and a mastiff that seems jumping out of the flower. The acronym "LOSC" is supplemented by the term "Lille Métropole" to enhance the Métropole Européenne de Lille size and importance in Western Europe. The club officials at that time wanted to entrench the club in its region, not only in the city but in a 1,000,000-inhabitants area where the club moved some facilities. This badge was marginally revised in 1997 but was replaced in 2002 with a more stylish one where the dog and the acronym are prominent. In 2012, the fleur-de-lys once again became a central element in the logo. The badge shape recalls the previous heraldry, and only the city and club name appear at the top of the logo like a crown.

The latest crest, which was unveiled in 2018, uses every club symbol (the club initials, the mastiff, the fleur-de-lys and the three colours) inside a regular pentagon shape, form of the Citadel of Lille's heart.

Lille OSC crest history

1944–1946 (Note: Escutcheon of the city of Lille)

1946–1955

1955–1974

1974–1981

1981–1989

1989–1997

1997–2002

2002–2012

2012–2018

=== Kits and sponsors ===
Period	Kit supplier	Main sponsor
1944–1970	None	None
1970–1971	Le Coq Sportif	None
1971–1973	Le Coq Sportif	Caby
1973–1974	Le Coq Sportif	Pel d'Or
1974–1975	Le Coq Sportif	Soda Krak GBM
1975–1979	Kopa	Peaudouce
1979–1988	Puma	Peaudouce
1988–1990	Duarig	Shopi
1990–1991	Constri-Foot	Eurest
1991–1992	Constri-Foot	Xylophene
1992–1993	Lotto	Eurest
1993–1994	ABM	Tousalon
1994–1995	ABM	La Redoute
1995–1996	Adidas	Aquatour
1996–1997	Reebok	Aquatour
1997–1998	Reebok	Polyfilla
1998–1999	Reebok	Crédit Agricole
1999–2000	Nike	Crédit Agricole
2000–2001	Nike	ING Direct
2001–2003	Kipsta	ING Direct
2003–2006	Kipsta	Partouche
2006–2008	Airness	Partouche
2008–2010	Canterbury	Partouche
2010–2013	Umbro	Partouche
2013–2014	Nike	Partouche
2014–2015	Nike	Etixx
2015–2016	Nike	Partouche
2016–2018	New Balance	Partouche
2018–2019	New Balance	None
2019–2022	New Balance	Boulanger
2022–2023	New Balance	Cazoo
2023–	New Balance	Boulanger

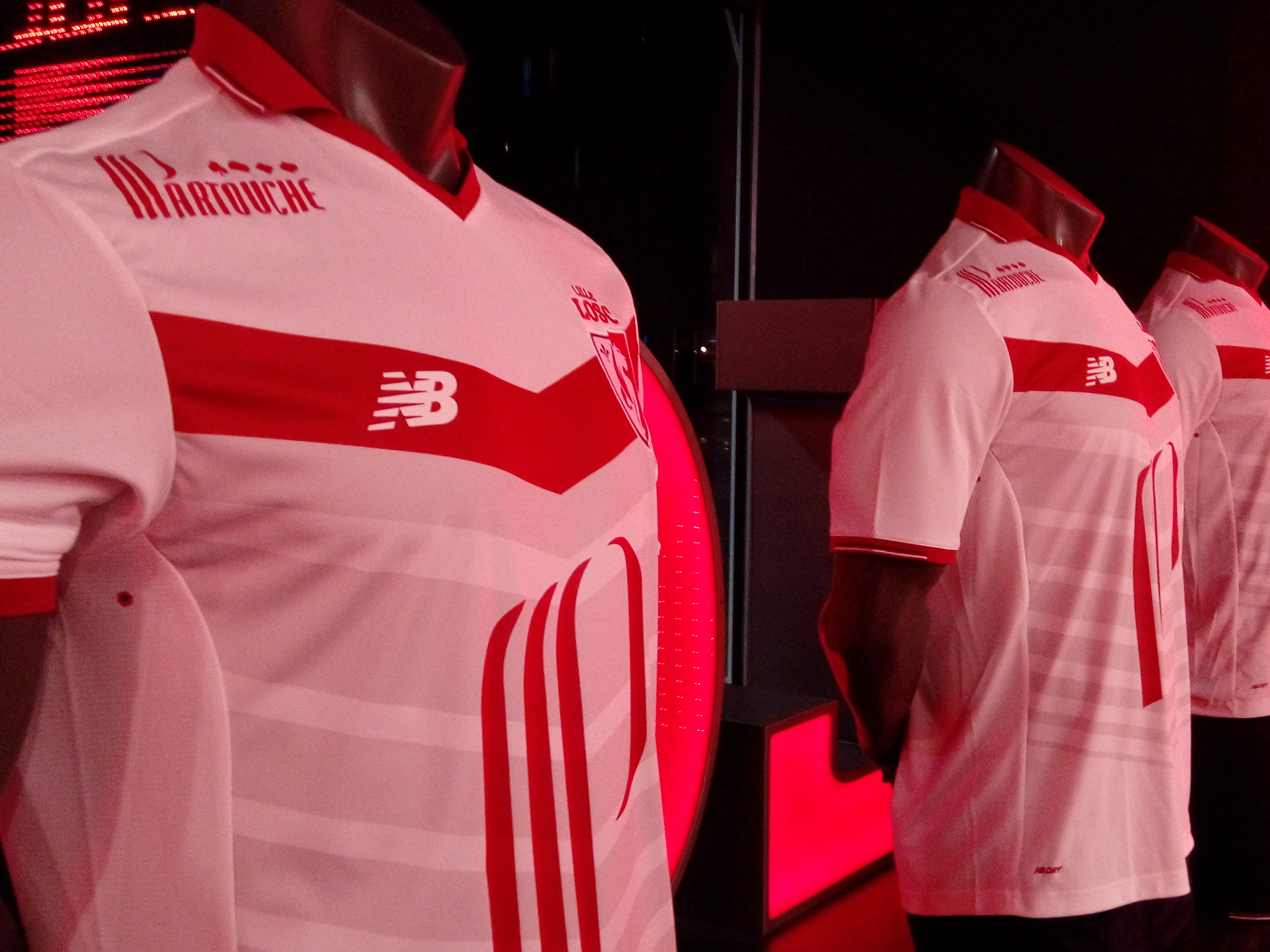
2016–17 home kits, with the red chevron

Born from the union of two teams, Lille OSC embraced different shirts elements and symbols of both founding clubs. The first club's home kit was white and blue. The white jersey, with a large red "V" or chevron form around the neck and red sleeve ends, is inspired by the Olympique Lillois home jersey while the "V" shape comes from SC Fives kits as well as the blue shorts and socks. White was the jersey primary color with little shades of red. The red chevron was part of each jersey until 1964 when it disappeared to give place to an immaculate white jersey that only kept red collar and sleeve ends. This jersey version, white with only few red shades around collar and sleeves, remains substantially the same for decades.

In the 1990s, the different kit manufacturers successively added different red shapes around shoulders like a red check pattern, a large Reebok logo that lines the top of the shirt or a plain red pattern enabling the presence of a white chevron with red borders. The 1992–93 season marked the quick return of the red chevron. 1999 marked a significant moment in LOSC kits history. At the beginning of this season, the club chose to switch the principal colour of the kits. Home jerseys are now dominated by red, while away ones are white overall. The club exceptionally returns to a white home kit for the 2016–17 Ligue 1 season to celebrate the league and cup double 70-year anniversary.

Third kits are traditionally used for European games. Being initially blue in the early 2000s, third kits then used and incorporated flag of Flanders colours: black and yellow. Since the beginning of the twenty-first century, the club released more than a dozen black or yellow third kits.

Lille have known many sporting goods manufacturers in its history. From its creation until the 1970s, Lille didn't have a proper kit supplier. The first club's kit manufacturer was Le Coq Sportif which made Lille's first branded jerseys until 1975. In the 1980s, the club's supplier was Puma, one of the famous Lille's kit maker. Puma's sponsorship lasted for nine years, and the German brand shirts remain engraved in people's memories. After this period, many suppliers have come and gone including Lotto and Adidas for brief contracts. Reebok received the contract in 1996, stayed three seasons, before Nike started a first spell in 1999. Decathlon's football brand Kipsta, which is based in Lille region, Airness and Canterbury, the rugby-specialized company, followed. In 2013, Umbro took over until Nike started a second spell in 2013 that lasted three years.

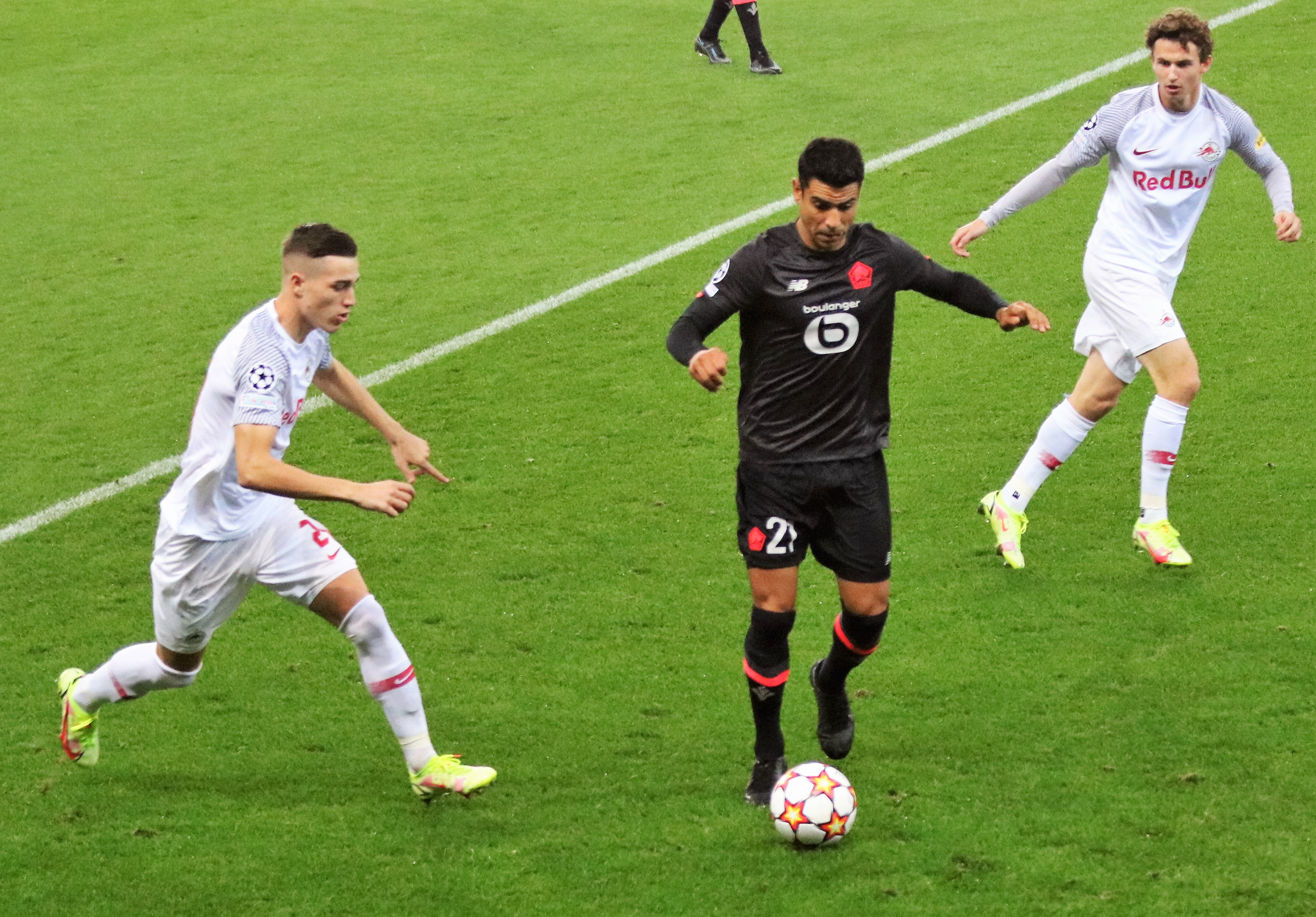
Benjamin André wearing 2020–21 third kit, sponsored by Boulanger

On 22 June 2016, Lille announced a five-year partnership with New Balance, becoming one of the biggest football teams that have signed with the Boston-based sportswear manufacturer. Partnership is renewed in 2021 on a new five-season contract until June 2026.

The first main sponsors of the club were Jean Caby butchery that appeared two seasons in the front of the jersey, and Lille-made Pel d'Or lemonade, produced by the very famous Pelforth brewery. One of the most iconic Lille sponsors is French nappy and baby products manufacturer Peaudouce that lasted more than ten years. Production factories were located in Linselles, in the Lille region and the nine red letters are now part of the identity of the club. However, Peaudouce was acquired by Sweden consumer products company SCA which decided to end the sponsorship. Foodservice company Eurest, banks Crédit Agricole and ING Direct are famous main sponsors too, that lasted at least two seasons.

Subsequently, the famous "P" of French casino and resort company Partouche appeared on Lille's jersey in 2003 for the first time. Based in the north of France, Partouche is Lille's most loyal sponsor: the brand logo was on the club's shirt during fourteen seasons. The most recent main sponsors are French consumer electronics retailer Boulanger and British online car retailer Cazoo.

1940s to 1960s	1970s	1980s	1999–present	2011–12 home	2012–13 away	2013–14 third	2015–16 third

== Grounds ==
=== Stadiums ===
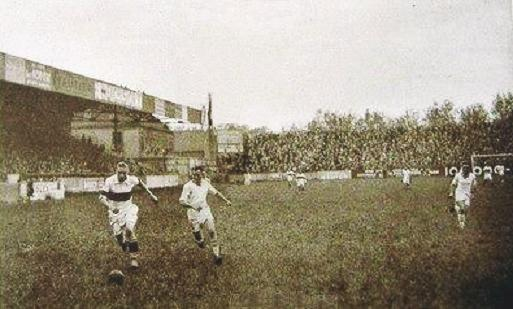
Stade Henri-Jooris in 1937

After its foundation following the merging of Olympique Lillois and SC Fives, Lille alternately played its home games at the stadiums of both clubs: Stade Henri-Jooris of Olympique Lillois and Stade Jules-Lemaire of SC Fives. However, in 1949, the club chose to keep the first as his home ground and to use the second as a training ground. Becoming more and more obsolete, Stade Jules-Lemaire was destroyed ten years later, in 1959. Named after Henri Jooris, the iconic president of Olympique Lillois, the 15,000-seat stadium, located by the Deûle river, near the Citadel of Lille, was the home of Les Dogues until 1975 when Lille moved at Stade Grimonprez-Jooris.

Located inside the citadel park, not far from the former venue, the stadium's original capacity was 25,000 at the time it was opened, but this was reduced to around 17,000 by 2000 due to the evolution of safety standards. In 2000, the stadium was renovated and its capacity was increased to 21,000. However, it still failed to meet FIFA licensing regulations and plans to build a new stadium compliant with UEFA's standards were made in 2002, when the club was privatized.

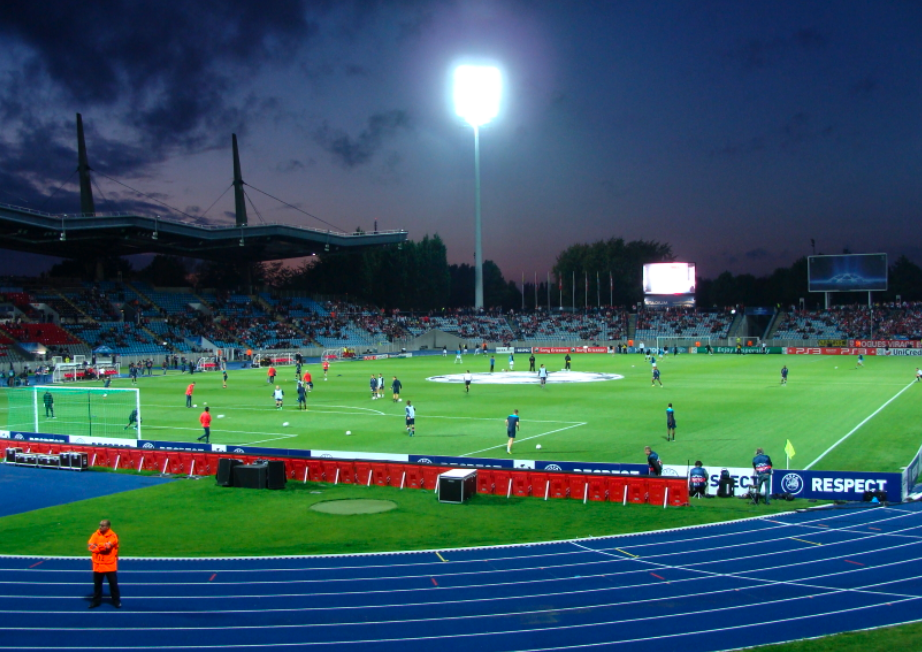
Stadium Nord Lille Métropole before 2011–12 UEFA Champions League game between Lille and CSKA Moscow

In June 2003, the club's board agreed to a new proposal put forward by the city mayor to build a new 33,000-seat stadium on the site of the Stade Grimonprez-Jooris. Preliminary works which included dismantling of training grounds were undertaken, and the delivery was scheduled for 31 December 2004 but was postponed. Construction work was then planned to begin in early 2005, but the project faced opposition from preservationists who successfully prevented the project to obtain necessary permits as the site of the stadium was close to the 17th-century citadel.

In May 2004, the stadium closed its doors and the delays forced Lille to play its league matches at Stadium Nord Lille Métropole, a 18,000-seat stadium in Villeneuve-d'Ascq, and their 2005–06 UEFA Champions League games at Stade de France in the Paris region. After two years of court battles, local courts had declared issued building permits void in July and December 2005, which meant that Grimonprez-Jooris II would never come into existence. Grimonprez-Jooris was demolished in 2010, six years after Lille OSC's departure. The club stayed at Stadium Lille Métropole until the end of the 2011–12 Ligue 1 season. While LOSC was struggling with its venue problems, the administrative landscape of the Lille area changed. The new administration, now in charge of the whole area, decided to launch a new stadium project.

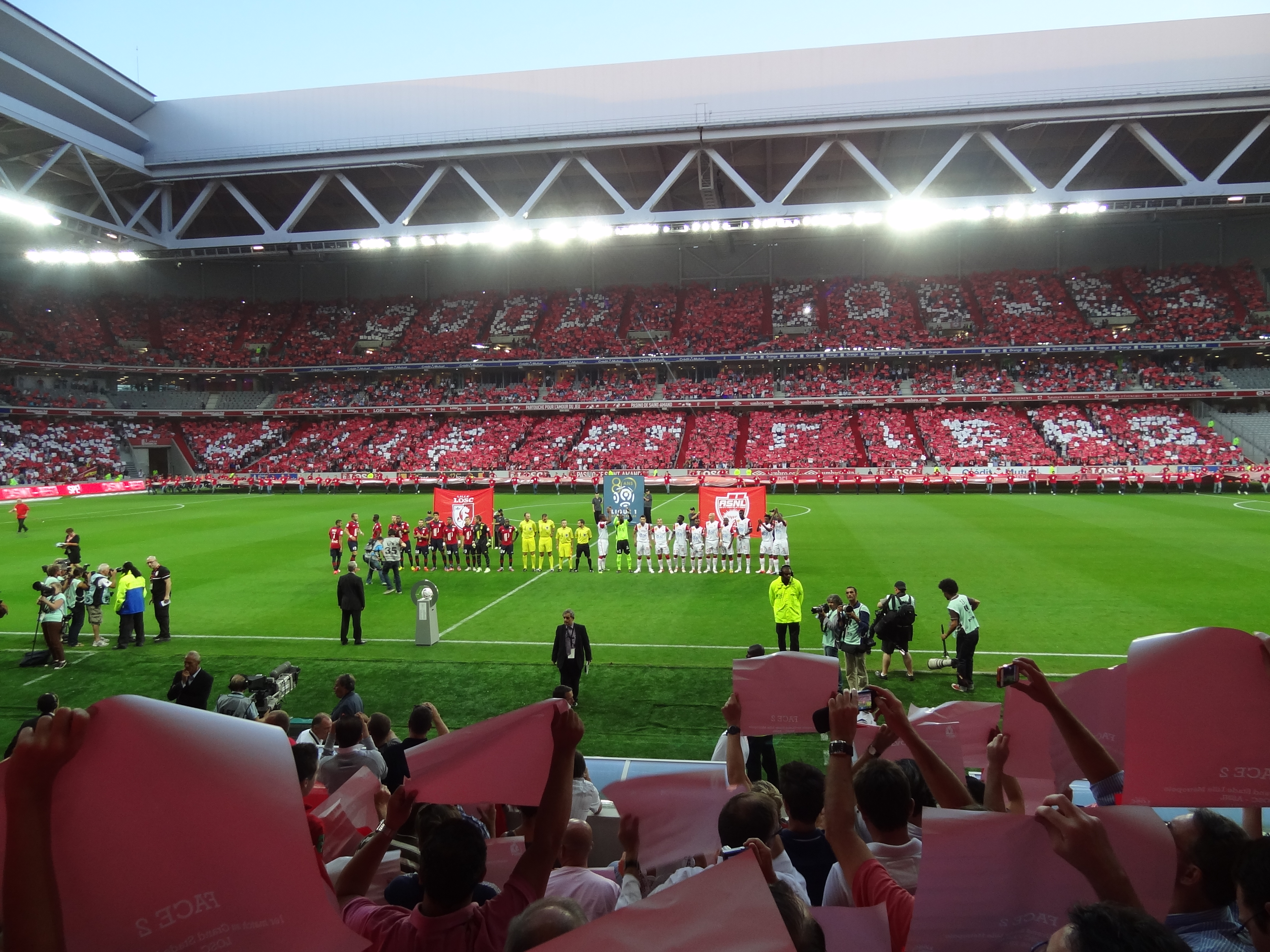
Lille lining up at the Stade Pierre-Mauroy before its first match in 2012

On 1 February 2008, Eiffage was selected during a general meeting to build a 50,000-seat capacity multi-purpose stadium with a retractable roof. The stadium has also a particularity: it can become a fully functional arena of 30,000 seats that can host basketball, tennis or handball games as well as concerts. Stade Pierre-Mauroy, known for sponsorship reasons as Decathlon Arena – Stade Pierre-Mauroy since 2022, was inaugurated on 17 August 2012. Originally named the Grand Stade Lille Métropole, the stadium was renamed in 2013 in honor of the former Mayor of Lille and former Prime Minister of France Pierre Mauroy. The stadium venue is located in Villeneuve-d'Ascq and has a seating capacity of 50,186 people, becoming France's fourth largest stadium.

The stadium hosted France national football team and France national rugby union team as well as some games of UEFA Euro 2016 and many Top 14 matches. It has been chosen to be one of the nine venues selected for France's hosting of the 2023 Rugby World Cup. The 30,000-seat arena hosted EuroBasket 2015, Davis Cup, 2017 World Men's Handball Championship and was also chosen to host handball and basketball tournaments at the 2024 Olympic Games.

The record attendance for a sports game stands at 49,712 spectators, who witnessed Lille's 5–1 win over Paris Saint-Germain in 2019.

Exterior view of the Lille OSC stadium Stade Pierre-Mauroy.

=== Training facilities ===
Located in Camphin-en-Pévèle, 15 minutes away from central Lille, the Domaine de Luchin has been the club's training ground since 2007. A 43-hectare estate, it houses nine full-size pitches (including one artificial turf pitch), one goalkeepers training field, the club headquarters, the academy facility, classrooms and bedrooms as well as a medical pole, a fitness centre, press areas and the famous "Dogue de Bronze" (French for "The Bronze Mastiff"), a bronze statue of a mastiff which has been installed in 2011 and appeared in many pictures and videos of the club. The main pitch is a stadium of 1,000 spectators, including 500 seats, that can host matches for the academy and women's teams. In March 2024, Lille OSC chose to rename this pitch after club legend Eden Hazard. The "Terrain Eden Hazard" (French for "Eden Hazard pitch") was inaugurated by the former Belgium captain in the company of his loved ones, ex-teammates, academy players and supporters groups.

A segment of the Berlin Wall, with a graffiti of Hazard by French artist C215 painted on it, has been unveiled in 2016 and is on display inside the centre.

== Club rivalries ==
The Derby du Nord (French for "The North Derby") is contested between Lille and RC Lens. The derby name refers only to their geographical location in France; both clubs and cities only being located in the northern part of France, within the Hauts-de-France region but not the same department. Being the fourth-largest city of the Pas-de-Calais department, Lens is located 30 kilometres south of regional prefecture and nerve centre Lille, Nord department main city. The name can also refer to matches involving Lille and Valenciennes as both clubs are located within Nord, however, the match historically refers to matches involving Lille and Lens. As a result, the Lille–Valenciennes match is sometimes referred to as Le Petit Derby du Nord (French for "The Little North Derby").

The two clubs first met in 1937 when Lille were playing under the Olympique Lillois emblem. Due to each club's close proximity towards each other being separated by only 30 kilometres (19 mi) and sociological differences between each club's supporters, a fierce rivalry developed. The North Derby is underpinned by social and economic differences, since the city of Lens is known as a working-class and industrial mining city whereas Lille as a middle-class, modern, internationally oriented cultural metropolis. This social class opposition is no longer relevant: both fanbases now come from lower and middle classes.

As of 2024, the teams have played more than 115 matches in all competitions, Lille winning 46, Lens 37, and the remaining 36 having been drawn. Lille have won the most top division titles, the most Coupe de France trophies and Trophée des Champions titles. The Mastiffs have also played more games in domestic and European top competitions and have more game wins in French top division than their nearby rivals.

== Honours ==
=== Domestic ===
==== League ====
- French Division 1/Ligue 1
  - Winners (4): 1945–46, 1953–54, 2010–11, 2020–21
  - Runners-up (6): 1947–48, 1948–49, 1949–50, 1950–51, 2004–05, 2018–19
- French Division 2
  - Winners (4): 1963–64, 1973–74, 1977–78, 1999–2000

==== Cups ====
- Coupe de France
  - Winners (6): 1945–46, 1946–47, 1947–48, 1952–53, 1954–55, 2010–11
  - Runners-up (2): 1944–45, 1948–49
- Coupe de la Ligue
  - Runners-up (1): 2015–16
- Trophée des Champions
  - Winners (1): 2021
  - Runners-up (2): 1955, 2011
- Coupe Charles Drago
  - Runners-up (2): 1954, 1956

=== Europe ===
- UEFA Intertoto Cup
  - Winners (1): 2004
  - Runners-up (1): 2002
- Latin Cup
  - Runners-up (1): 1951

=== Doubles ===
- French Division 1/Ligue 1 and Coupe de France (2): 1945–46, 2010–11

=== Individual ===
UNFP Awards and Prix Marc-Vivien Foé
- UNFP Player of the Year
  - (Belgium) Eden Hazard – 2011
  - (Belgium) Eden Hazard – 2012
- UNFP Young Player of the Year
  - (Belgium) Eden Hazard – 2009
  - (Belgium) Eden Hazard – 2010
- UNFP Goalkeeper of the Year
  - (France) Mike Maignan – 2019
  - (France) Lucas Chevalier – 2025
- UNFP Manager of the Year
  - (France) Claude Puel – 2006
  - (France) Rudi Garcia – 2011
  - (France) René Girard – 2014
  - (France) Christophe Galtier – 2019
  - (France) Christophe Galtier – 2021
- UNFP Goal of the Year
  - (France) Loïc Rémy – 2019
  - (Turkey) Burak Yılmaz – 2021
- Prix Marc-Vivien Foé
  - (Ivory Coast) Gervinho – 2010
  - (Ivory Coast) Gervinho – 2011
  - (Nigeria) Vincent Enyeama – 2014
  - (Morocco) Sofiane Boufal – 2016
  - (Ivory Coast) Nicolas Pépé – 2019
  - (Nigeria) Victor Osimhen – 2020

Correct as of 2025

== Results ==
=== Domestic record ===
==== League history ====
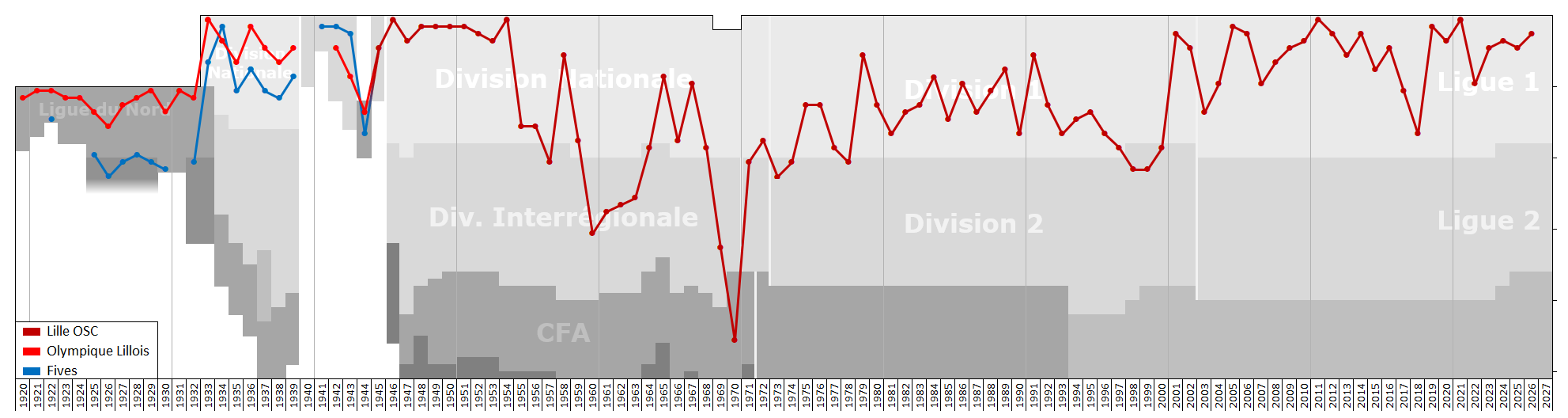
Historical league performance chart of Lille OSC

1944–1956 Division 1 (L1); 1956–1957 Division 2 (L2); 1957–1959 Division 1 (L1); 1959–1964 Division 2 (L2); 1964–1968 Division 1 (L1)	1968–1969 Division 2 (L2); 1969–1970 CFA (Am.); 1970–1971 Division 2 (L2); 1971–1972 Division 1 (L1); 1972–1974 Division 2 (L2)	1974–1977 Division 1 (L1); 1977–1978 Division 2 (L2); 1978–1997 Division 1 (L1); 1997–2000 Division 2 (L2); 2000–present Ligue 1 (L1)

L1 = Level 1 of the football league system; L2 = Level 2 of the football league system; Am. = Amateur first tier of the football league system

==== List of 21st-century seasons ====
Domestic Results in Division 1/Ligue 1 since 2000
Domestic league	League result	Qualification to
2025–26 Ligue 1	3rd	UEFA Champions League
2024–25 Ligue 1	5th	UEFA Europa League
2023–24 Ligue 1	4th	UEFA Champions League
2022–23 Ligue 1	5th	UEFA Europa Conference League
2021–22 Ligue 1	10th	
2020–21 Ligue 1	1st	UEFA Champions League
2019–20 Ligue 1	4th (season stopped due to COVID-19 pandemic)	UEFA Europa League
2018–19 Ligue 1	2nd	UEFA Champions League
2017–18 Ligue 1	17th	
2016–17 Ligue 1	11th	
2015–16 Ligue 1	5th	UEFA Europa League
2014–15 Ligue 1	8th	
2013–14 Ligue 1	3rd	UEFA Champions League
2012–13 Ligue 1	6th	
2011–12 Ligue 1	3rd	UEFA Champions League
2010–11 Ligue 1	1st	UEFA Champions League
2009–10 Ligue 1	4th	UEFA Europa League
2008–09 Ligue 1	5th	UEFA Europa League
2007–08 Ligue 1	7th	
2006–07 Ligue 1	10th	
2005–06 Ligue 1	3rd	UEFA Champions League
2004–05 Ligue 1	2nd	UEFA Champions League
2003–04 Ligue 1	10th	UEFA Intertoto Cup
2002–03 Ligue 1	14th	
2001–02 French Division 1	5th	UEFA Intertoto Cup
2000–01 French Division 1	3rd	UEFA Champions League

=== Continental record ===
==== UEFA club coefficient ranking ====
As of 1 June 2025

Rank	↑↓	Club	Points
24	▲	(Netherlands) PSV Eindhoven	59.250
25	▼	(Italy) Lazio	59.000
26	▲	(France) Lille	58.000
27	▲	(Spain) Real Sociedad	57.000
28	▼	(Portugal) Porto	56.750

== Players ==
=== Current squad ===
As of 6 September 2026

Note: Flags indicate national team as defined under FIFA eligibility rules; some limited exceptions apply. Players may hold more than one non-FIFA nationality.

No.	Pos.	Nation	Player
1	GK	TUR	Berke Özer
2	DF	SUI	Loun Srdanović
3	DF	BEL	Nathan Ngoy
4	DF	BRA	Alexsandro
6	MF	ALG	Nabil Bentaleb
7	FW	FRA	Dilane Bakwa (on loan from Nottingham Forest)
8	FW	FRA	Ethan Mbappé
9	FW	FRA	Olivier Giroud (vice-captain)
10	MF	ISL	Hákon Haraldsson
11	FW	MAR	Osame Sahraoui
12	GK	PAR	Orlando Gill
14	MF	DEN	Maurits Kjærgaard
15	DF	FRA	Romain Perraud

No.	Pos.	Nation	Player
17	MF	COD	Ngal'ayel Mukau
18	FW	JPN	Ayase Ueda
19	FW	TUR	Başar Önal
21	MF	FRA	Benjamin André (captain)
22	DF	POR	Tiago Santos
23	DF	FRA	Tanguy Nianzou
24	DF	IDN	Calvin Verdonk
26	DF	FRA	Isaac Cossier
28	FW	FRA	Gaëtan Perrin
29	FW	MAR	Hamza Igamane
35	FW	FRA	Soriba Diaoune
38	DF	FRA	Maxima Goffi

==== Out on loan ====
Note: Flags indicate national team as defined under FIFA eligibility rules; some limited exceptions apply. Players may hold more than one non-FIFA nationality.

No.	Pos.	Nation	Player
—	GK	BEL	Arnaud Bodart (at Le Havre until 30 June 2027)
—	DF	POR	Rafael Fernandes (at Marítimo until 30 June 2027)
—	DF	CMR	Stéphane Noumbissie (at Sigma Olomouc until 30 June 2027)
—	DF	FRA	Ousmane Touré (at Dunkerque until 30 June 2027)
—	MF	ARG	Ignacio Miramón (at Gimnasia LP until 31 December 2026)

No.	Pos.	Nation	Player
—	FW	NOR	Marius Broholm (at Utrecht until 30 June 2027)
—	FW	POR	Félix Correia (at Sevilla until 30 June 2027)
—	FW	FRA	Noah Edjouma (at Brest until 30 June 2027)
—	FW	FRA	Younes Lachaab (at Sabah until 30 June 2027)

=== Reserve team ===
The following players have previously made appearances or have appeared on the substitutes bench for the first-team.

Note: Flags indicate national team as defined under FIFA eligibility rules; some limited exceptions apply. Players may hold more than one non-FIFA nationality.

No.	Pos.	Nation	Player
—	GK	FRA	Zadig Lanssade
—	GK	FRA	Thomas Sajous
—	FW	ALG	Saad Boussadia

No.	Pos.	Nation	Player
—	FW	POR	Tiago Morais
—	FW	CMR	Angel Yondjo

=== Notable former players ===
==== Goalkeepers ====
- (France) Robert Germain (1946–49)
- (France) César Ruminski (1952–55)
- (France) Jean Van Gool (1954–68)
- (France) Charles Samoy (1963–74)
- (France) Philippe Bergerôo (1978–83)
- (France) Bernard Lama (1981–89)
- (France) Jean-Claude Nadon (1989–96)
- (France) Grégory Wimbée (1998–2004)
- (Senegal) Tony Sylva (2004–08)
- (France) Mickaël Landreau (2009–12)
- (Nigeria) Vincent Enyeama (2011–18)
- (France) Mike Maignan (2015–21)
- (France) Lucas Chevalier (2022–25)

==== Defenders ====
- (France) Joseph Jadrejak (1944–50)
- (France) Jean-Marie Prévost (1945–52)
- (France) Marceau Somerlinck (1945–57)
- (France) Jacques Van Cappelen (1949–55)
- (Netherlands) Cor van der Hart (1950–54)
- (France) Guillaume Bieganski (1951–59)
- (France) Robert Lemaître (1953–56)
- (France) Antoine Pazur (1952–60)
- (France) Bernard Stakowiak (1958–69)
- (France) Claude Andrien (1962–69)
- (France) Marcel Adamczyk (1963–68)
- (France) Jean-Luc Buisine (1962–69)
- (Chile) Ignacio Prieto (1971–76)
- (France) Pierre Dréossi (1976–82)
- (France) René Marsiglia (1978–83)
- (France) Éric Péan (1981–87)
- (Algeria) Noureddine Kourichi (1982–86)
- (Socialist Federal Republic of Yugoslavia) Boro Primorac (1983–86)
- (France) Éric Prissette (1983–90)
- (France) Dominique Thomas (1983–88, 89–93)
- (France) Jocelyn Angloma (1987–90)
- (Denmark) Jakob Friis-Hansen (1989–95)
- (France) Fabien Leclercq (1989–99)
- (France) Pascal Cygan (1995–2002)
- (France) Grégory Tafforeau (2001–09)
- (France) Eric Abidal (2002–04)
- (France) Matthieu Chalmé (2002–07)
- (France) Mathieu Debuchy (2003–13)
- (France) Nicolas Plestan (2003–10)
- (Greece) Stathis Tavlaridis (2004–07)
- (Switzerland) Stephan Lichtsteiner (2005–08)
- (Brazil) Emerson (2006–11)
- (France) Adil Rami (2006–11)
- (France) Franck Béria (2007–17)
- (Cameroon) Aurélien Chedjou (2007–13)
- (Czech Republic) David Rozehnal (2010–15)
- (Senegal) Pape Souaré (2010–15)
- (Montenegro) Marko Baša (2011–17)
- (France) Lucas Digne (2011–13)
- (France) Djibril Sidibé (2012–16)
- (Denmark) Simon Kjær (2013–15)
- (France) Adama Soumaoro (2013–21)
- (France) Sébastien Corchia (2014–17)
- (France) Benjamin Pavard (2015–16)
- (Brazil) Gabriel (2017–20)
- (Turkey) Zeki Çelik (2018–22)
- (Portugal) José Fonte (2018–23)
- (Mozambique) Reinildo Mandava (2019–22)
- (Portugal) Tiago Djaló (2019–24)
- (Netherlands) Sven Botman (2020–22)
- (Sweden) Gabriel Gudmundsson (2021–25)
- (France) Bafodé Diakité (2022–25)
- (Brazil) Ismaily (2022–25)
- (France) Leny Yoro (2022–24)
- (Belgium) Thomas Meunier (2024–26)

==== Midfielders ====
- (France) Jules Bigot (1944–50)
- (France) François Bourbotte (1944–47)
- (France) Roger Carré (1944–50)
- (France) Albert Dubreucq (1945–53)
- (France) Roland Clauws (1953–60, 62–64)
- (France) Alain de Martigny (1970–76)
- (France) Alain Verhoeve (1970–74)
- (Chile) Alberto Fouillioux (1972–75)
- (France) Serge Besnard (1975–79)
- (France) Alain Grumelon (1976–83)
- (France) Arnaud Dos Santos (1977–81)
- (France) Stéphane Plancque (1977–87)
- (France) Didier Simon (1977–82)
- (France) Pascal Plancque (1980–87)
- (France) Philippe Périlleux (1984–91, 95–96)
- (France) Alain Fiard (1987–93)
- (France) Victor Da Silva (1988–92)
- (France) Arnaud Duncker (1994–98)
- (France) Patrick Collot (1995–2002)
- (France) Christophe Landrin (1996–2005)
- (France) Bruno Cheyrou (1998–2002)
- (France) Benoît Cheyrou (1999–2004)
- (Argentina) Fernando D'Amico (1999–2003)
- (Senegal) Sylvain N'Diaye (2000–03)
- (Cameroon) Jean Makoun (2001–08)
- (France) Philippe Brunel (2002–05)
- (France) Mathieu Bodmer (2003–07)
- (France) Stéphane Dumont (2003–11)
- (Slovenia) Milenko Ačimovič (2004–06)
- (France) Yohan Cabaye (2004–11)
- (France) Florent Balmont (2008–16)
- (France) Rio Mavuba (2008–17)
- (Senegal) Idrissa Gueye (2010–15)
- (England) Joe Cole (2011–12)
- (France) Dimitri Payet (2011–13)
- (France) Benoît Pedretti (2011–13)
- (Portugal) Rony Lopes (2014–15, 16–17)
- (Mali) Yves Bissouma (2016–18)
- (Brazil) Thiago Mendes (2017–19)
- (France) Boubakary Soumaré (2017–21)
- (Portugal) Xeka (2017–22)
- (Portugal) Renato Sanches (2019–22)
- (Turkey) Yusuf Yazıcı (2019–24)
- (England) Angel Gomes (2020–25)
- (Belgium) Amadou Onana (2021–22)
- (France) Rémy Cabella (2022–25)
- (Morocco) Ayyoub Bouaddi (2023–26)

==== Forwards ====
- (France) Jean Baratte (1944–53, 56–57)
- (France) René Bihel (1944–46)
- (France) Jean Lechantre (1944–52)
- (France) Roger Vandooren (1944–50)
- (France) Bolek Tempowski (1945–51)
- (France) Marius Walter (1945–52)
- (France) André Strappe (1948–58)
- (France) Bernard Lefèvre (1949–56, 62–63)
- (Denmark) Erik Kuld Jensen (1950–53)
- (France) Jean Vincent (1950–56)
- (France) Gérard Bourbotte (1952–58, 63–68)
- (France) Yvon Douis (1953–59)
- (France) Fernand Devlaminck (1956–59)
- (France) François Heutte (1957–59, 65–66)
- (France) René Fatoux (1957–62)
- (France) André Guy (1965–67)
- (France) Christian Coste (1973–77)
- (Socialist Federal Republic of Yugoslavia) Stanislav Karasi (1974–77)
- (Socialist Federal Republic of Yugoslavia) Žarko Olarević (1977–81)
- (France) Pierre Pleimelding (1977–81)
- (Socialist Federal Republic of Yugoslavia) Dušan Savić (1983–85)
- (Belgium) Erwin Vandenbergh (1986–90)
- (Ghana) Abedi Pele (1988–90)
- (Denmark) Per Frandsen (1990–94)
- (Armenia) Éric Assadourian (1990–95)
- (France) Antoine Sibierski (1992–96)
- (Sweden) Kennet Andersson (1993–94)
- (France) Djézon Boutoille (1993–2004)
- (France) Matt Moussilou (2001–06)
- (France) Nicolas Fauvergue (2003–11)
- (Belgium) Kevin Mirallas (2004–08)
- (Nigeria) Peter Odemwingie (2004–07)
- (Ivory Coast) Kader Keïta (2005–07)
- (Brazil) Michel Bastos (2006–09)
- (Belgium) Eden Hazard (2007–12)
- (Netherlands) Patrick Kluivert (2007–08)
- (Poland) Ludovic Obraniak (2007–12)
- (Brazil) Túlio de Melo (2008–14)
- (Slovakia) Róbert Vittek (2008–10)
- (France) Pierre-Alain Frau (2008–11)
- (Gabon) Pierre-Emerick Aubameyang (2009–10)
- (Ivory Coast) Gervinho (2009–11)
- (Senegal) Moussa Sow (2010–12)
- (Ivory Coast) Salomon Kalou (2012–14)
- (Belgium) Divock Origi (2012–15)
- (France) Nolan Roux (2012–15)
- (Morocco) Sofiane Boufal (2015–16)
- (Portugal) Eder (2016–18)
- (France) Martin Terrier (2016–18)
- (Brazil) Luiz Araújo (2017–21)
- (South Africa) Lebo Mothiba (2017–18)
- (Ivory Coast) Nicolas Pépé (2017–19)
- (France) Jonathan Ikoné (2018–22)
- (Ivory Coast) Jonathan Bamba (2018–23)
- (Portugal) Rafael Leão (2018–19)
- (France) Loïc Rémy (2018–20)
- (Nigeria) Victor Osimhen (2019–20)
- (United States) Timothy Weah (2019–23)
- (Canada) Jonathan David (2020–25)
- (Turkey) Burak Yılmaz (2020–22)
- (Kosovo) Edon Zhegrova (2022–25)
- (Belgium) Matias Fernandez-Pardo (2024–26)

=== Notable past line-ups ===

Usual line-up for the double-winning 1945–46 season

Usual line-up for the double-winning 2010–11 season

Usual line-up for the title-winning 2020–21 season

== Club officials ==
- Owner of Lille Olympique Sporting Club – LOSC Lille: (Luxembourg) Merlyn Partners SCSp

=== Board of directors ===
Position	Name	Ref.
Shareholders	(Netherlands) Maarten Petermann (Italy) Alessandro Barnaba (Germany) Maren Schirmer	
President	(France) Olivier Létang	
President of LOSC Association	(France) Patrick Robert	

=== First-team coaching staff ===
As of 1 July 2026

Position	Name
Head coach	(Italy) Davide Ancelotti
Assistant coaches	(Spain) Luis Tevenet (England) Andrew Mangan
Assistant and set-piece coach	(Spain) Diego Nogales
Assistant and individual development coach	(France) Mickaël D'Amore
Goalkeeping coach	(France) Rémy Vercoutre
Head of high performance	(France) Benoit Delaval
Fitness coaches	(Spain) Mario Sandúa (France) Stéphane Caterina
Data scientist	(France) Benjamin Barthélémy
Head of analysis	(France) Alexis Marie
Analysts	(France) Hugo Dufour (France) Thonin Broutée

== Coaching history ==
The following is a list of Lille OSC head coaches from the foundation of the club in 1944, until the present day.

Tenure	Head coach
1944–1946	(England) George Berry
1946–1958	(France) André Cheuva
1958–1959	(France) Jacques Delepaut (caretaker)
1959–1961	(France) Jules Vandooren
1961–1962	(France) Jean Baratte
1962	(France) Jean Van Gool (caretaker)
1962–1963	(France) Guy Poitevin
1963–1966	(France) Jules Bigot
1966	(France) Jean Van Gool (caretaker)
1966–1969	(France) Daniel Langrand
1969–1970	(France) Joseph Jadrejak
1970–1973	(France) René Gardien
1973–1976	(France) Georges Peyroche
1976–1977	(France) Charles Samoy (caretaker)
1977–1982	(France) José Arribas
1982–1984	(France) Arnaud Dos Santos
1984–1989	(Belgium) Georges Heylens
1989–1992	(France) Jacques Santini
1991	(Croatia) Milan Đuričić (France) Jacques Santini
1992–1993	(France) Bruno Metsu
1993	(Poland) Henryk Kasperczak

Tenure	Head coach
1993–1994	(France) Pierre Mankowski
1994–1995	(France) Jean Fernandez
1995–1997	(France) Jean-Michel Cavalli
1997	(France) Hervé Gauthier (France) Charles Samoy (caretaker)
1997–1998	(France) Thierry Froger
1998–2001	(Bosnia and Herzegovina) Vahid Halilhodžić
2001–2002	(France) Bruno Baronchelli (caretaker)
2002	(Bosnia and Herzegovina) Vahid Halilhodžić
2002–2008	(France) Claude Puel
2008–2013	(France) Rudi Garcia
2013–2015	(France) René Girard
2015	(France) Hervé Renard
2015	(France) Patrick Collot (caretaker)
2015–2016	(France) Frédéric Antonetti
2016–2017	(France) Patrick Collot (caretaker)
2017	(France) Franck Passi (caretaker)
2017	(Argentina) Marcelo Bielsa
2017	(Portugal) João Sacramento (caretaker)
2017–2021	(France) Christophe Galtier
2021–2022	(France) Jocelyn Gourvennec
2022–2024	(Portugal) Paulo Fonseca

Tenure	Head coach
2024–2026	(France) Bruno Génésio
2026–	(Italy) Davide Ancelotti

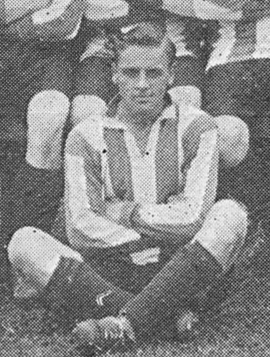
George Berry

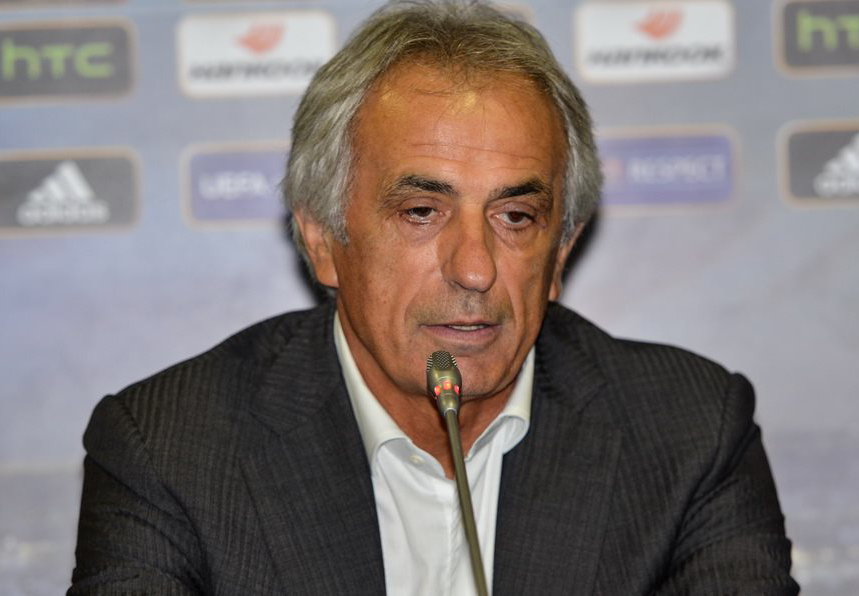
Vahid Halilhodžić

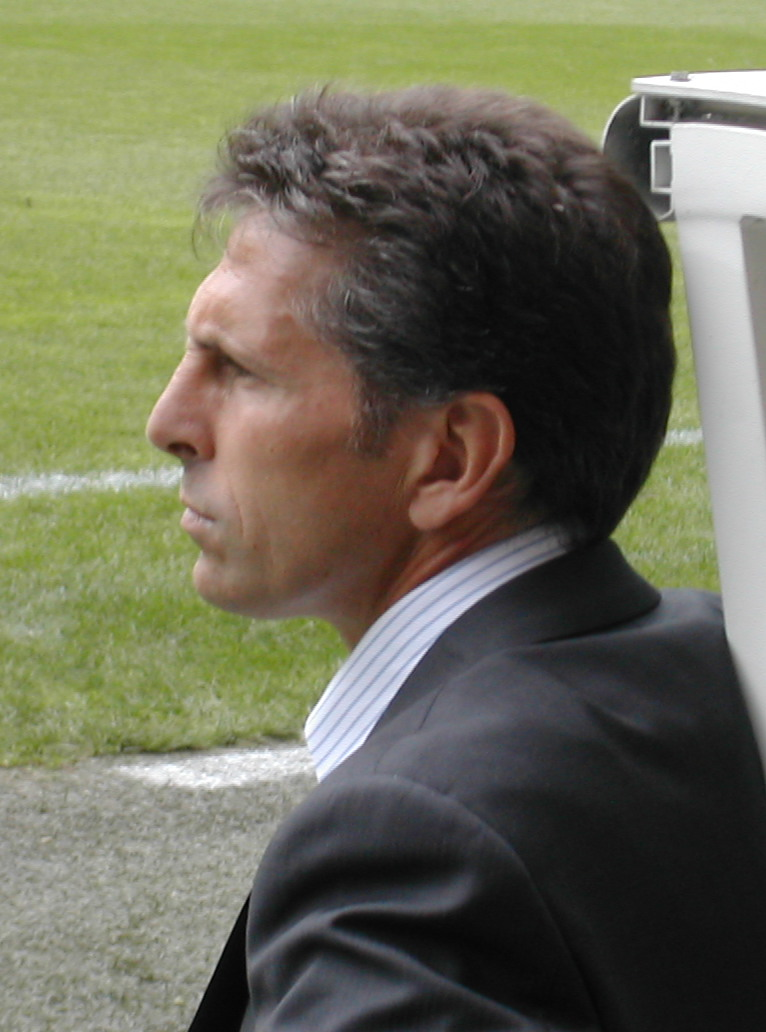
Claude Puel

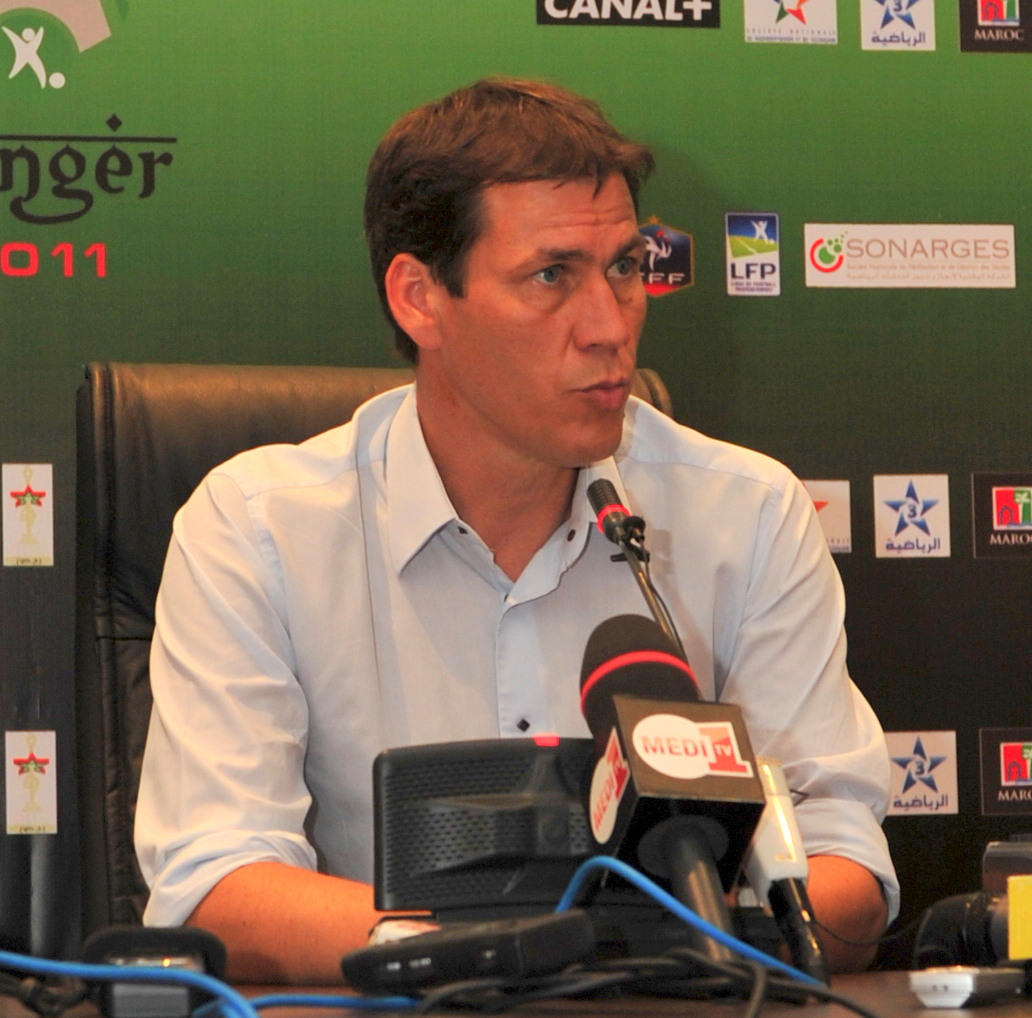
Rudi Garcia

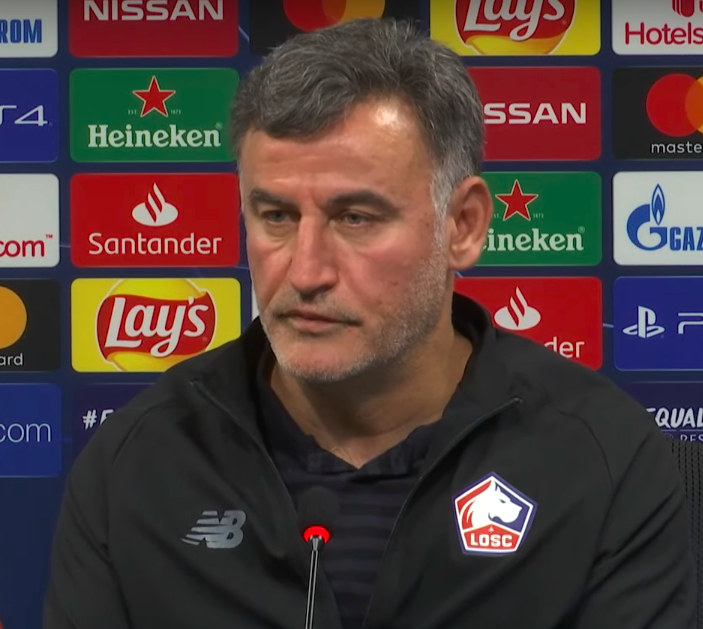
Christophe Galtier

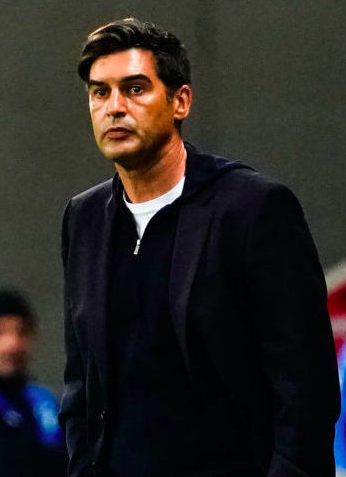
Paulo Fonseca

== Records and statistics ==
=== Coaching records ===
==== Trophy-winning head coaches ====
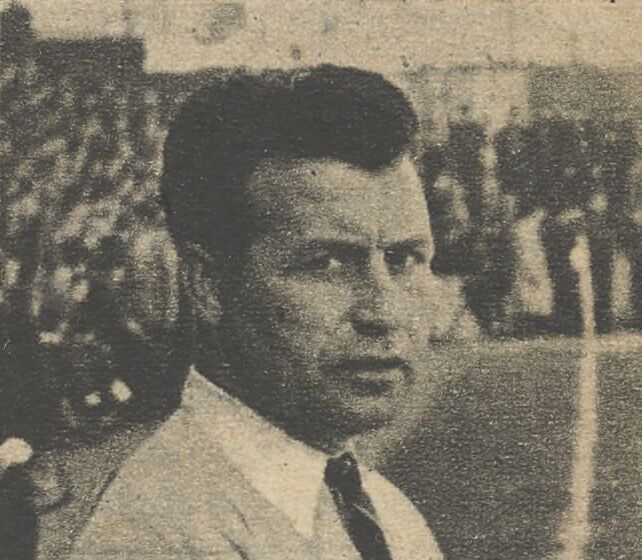
André Cheuva, Lille's most successful head coach

Rank	Head coach	L1	L2	CdF	TdC	UIC	Total
1	(France) André Cheuva	1	–	4	–	–	5
2	(England) George Berry	1	–	1	–	–	2
3	(France) Rudi Garcia	1	–	1	–	–	2
4	(France) Christophe Galtier	1	–	–	–	–	1
5	(France) Jules Bigot	–	1	–	–	–	1
6	(France) Georges Peyroche	–	1	–	–	–	1
7	(France) José Arribas	–	1	–	–	–	1
8	(Bosnia and Herzegovina) Vahid Halilhodžić	–	1	–	–	–	1
9	(France) Jocelyn Gourvennec	–	–	–	1	–	1
10	(France) Claude Puel	–	–	–	–	1	1

=== Player records ===
As of 17 May 2025

==== Most appearances ====
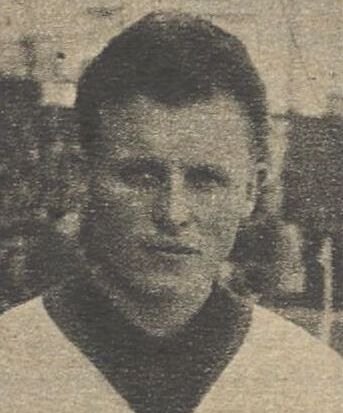
Marceau Somerlinck, Lille's player with most appearances

Rank	Player	Matches
1	(France) Marceau Somerlinck	433
2	(France) Rio Mavuba	370
3	(France) André Strappe	365
4	(France) Florent Balmont	323
5	(France) Franck Béria	317

==== Top goalscorers ====
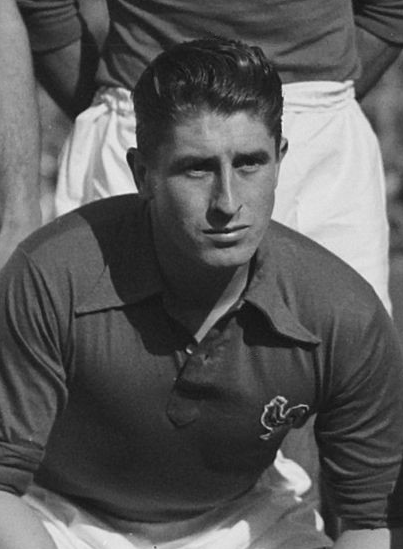
Jean Baratte, Lille's all-time record goalscorer

Rank	Player	Goals
1	(France) Jean Baratte	224
2	(France) André Strappe	134
3	(Canada) Jonathan David	109
4	(France) Gérard Bourbotte	92
5	(France) Jean Lechantre	90

=== Transfer records ===
==== Highest transfer fees paid ====
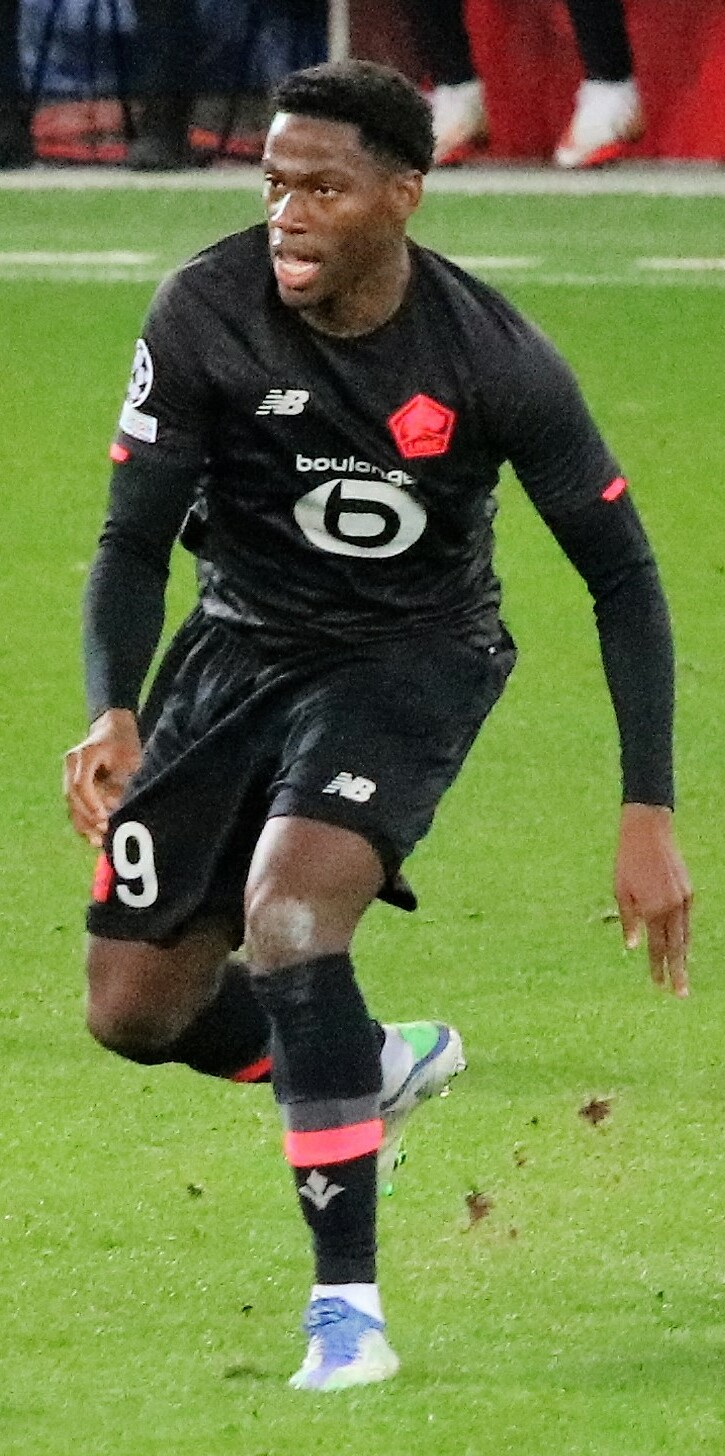
Jonathan David, Lille's current record signing

As of 1 September 2026

Rank	Player	From	Transfer fee (€ millions)	Year	Ref.
1	(Canada) Jonathan David	(Belgium) Gent	€27 (Note: Initial €27 million plus reported €5 million bonuses)	2020	
2	(Portugal) Renato Sanches	(Germany) Bayern Munich	€20	2019	
3	(Turkey) Yusuf Yazıcı	(Turkey) Trabzonspor	€16.5 (Note: Initial €16.5 million plus 50% of the rights to Edgar Ié)	2017	
4	(Japan) Ayase Ueda	(Netherlands) Feyenoord	€15	2026	
5	(Brazil) Thiago Maia	(Brazil) Santos	€14	2017	
5	(Guinea) Mohamed Bayo	(France) Clermont	€14	2022	
7	(Nigeria) Victor Osimhen	(Belgium) Charleroi	€12 (Note: Initial €12 million plus reported €3 million bonuses)	2019	
7	(Iceland) Hákon Arnar Haraldsson	(Denmark) Copenhagen	€12 (Note: Initial €12 million plus reported €5 million bonuses)	2023	
7	(Morocco) Hamza Igamane	(Scotland) Rangers	€12	2025	
10	(Brazil) Luiz Araújo	(Brazil) São Paulo	€10.5	2017	

==== Highest transfer fees received ====
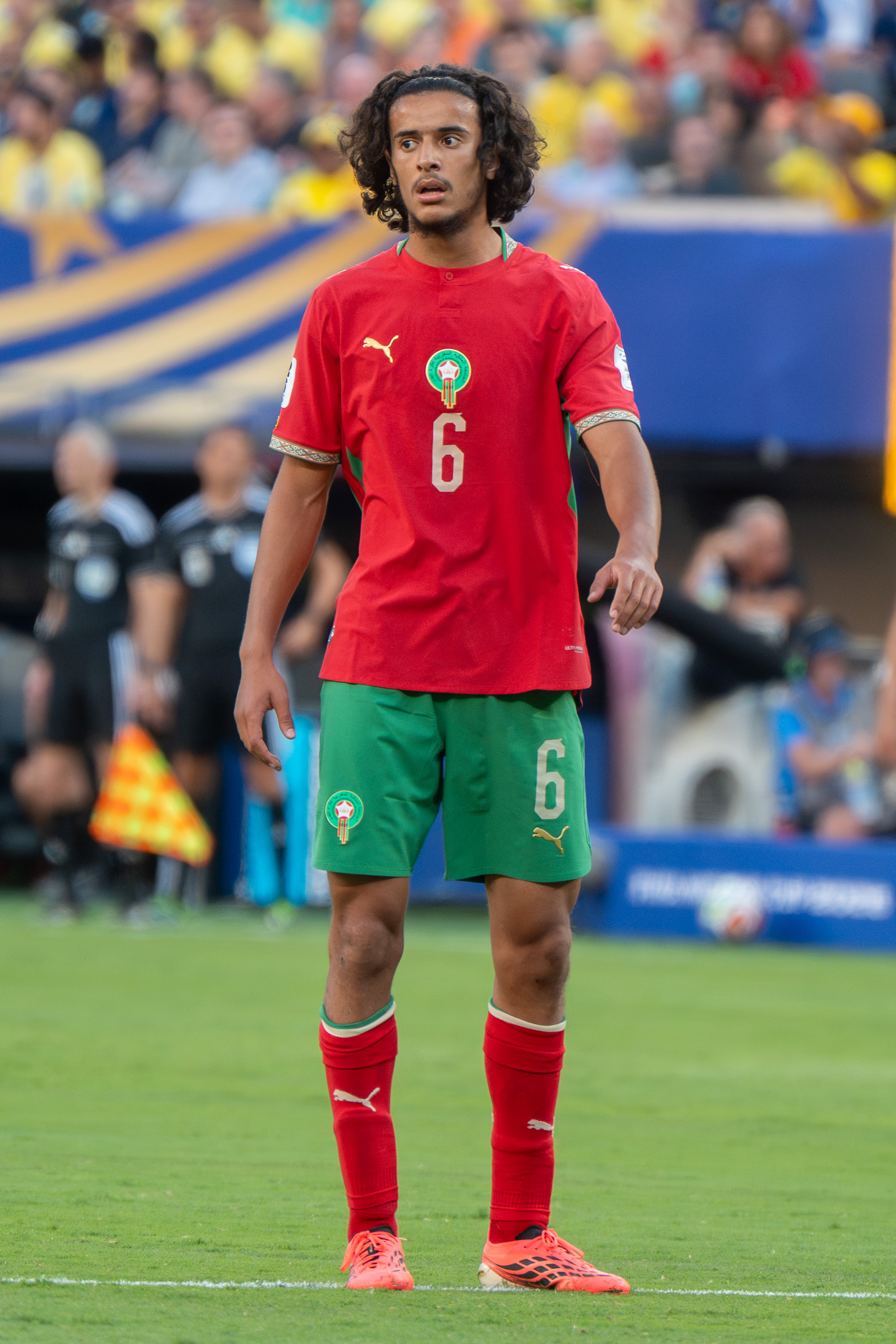
Ayyoub Bouaddi, Lille's current record sale

As of 1 September 2026

Rank	Player	To	Transfer fee (€ millions)	Year	Ref.
1	(Morocco) Ayyoub Bouaddi	(England) Manchester City	€95 (Note: Initial €95 million plus reported €5 million bonuses)	2026	
2	(Ivory Coast) Nicolas Pépé	(England) Arsenal	€80 (Note: Initial €80 million plus undisclosed bonuses)	2019	
3	(Nigeria) Victor Osimhen	(Italy) Napoli	€71.2 (Note: Initial €71.2 million plus reported €10.1 million guaranteed bonuses)	2020	
4	(France) Leny Yoro	(England) Manchester United	€62 (Note: Initial €62 million plus reported €8 million bonuses)	2024	
5	(Belgium) Matias Fernandez-Pardo	(England) Newcastle United	€60 (Note: Initial €60 million plus reported €5 million bonuses and 20% sell-on clause)	2026	
6	(France) Lucas Chevalier	(France) Paris Saint-Germain	€40 (Note: Initial €40 million plus reported €15 million bonuses)	2025	
7	(Netherlands) Sven Botman	(England) Newcastle United	€37 (Note: Initial €37 million plus reported €3 million bonuses)	2022	
8	(Belgium) Amadou Onana	(England) Everton	€36 (Note: Initial €36 million plus reported €4 million bonuses and 20% sell-on clause)	2022	
9	(Belgium) Eden Hazard	(England) Chelsea	€35 (Note: Transfer agreement was revealed in Football Leaks)	2012	
9	(Portugal) Rafael Leão	(Italy) Milan	€35 (Note: Initial €35 million plus 20% sell-on clause)	2019	
9	(France) Bafodé Diakité	(England) Bournemouth	€35 (Note: Initial €35 million plus reported €5 million bonuses)	2025	

== See also ==
- Lille OSC in European football
- List of football clubs in France
- Football records and statistics in France
