= René Bihel =

French footballer (1916-1997)

Personal information
- Full name: René Bihel
- Date of birth: 2 September 1916
- Place of birth: Montivilliers, France
- Date of death: 8 September 1997 (aged 81)
- Height: 1.74 m (5 ft 9 in)
- Position: Forward

Youth career
- 1929–1936: US Tréfileries du Havre

Senior career*
Years	Team	Apps	(Gls)
1936–1938	US Quevilly		
1938–1939	Valenciennes		
1939–1942	Le Havre		
1942–1943	SC Fives		
1943–1944	EF Lille-Flandres		
1944–1946	Lille		
1946–1947	Le Havre		
1947–1949	Marseille		
1949–1950	SC Toulon		
1950–1951	Strasbourg		
1951–1953	AAJ Blois		
1953–1954	Le Havre		

International career
1945–1947	France	6	(1)

Managerial career
- 1953–1954: Le Havre
- 1954–1956: AAJ Blois
- * Club domestic league appearances and goals

René Bihel (2 September 1916 – 8 September 1997) was a French professional football player who became a trainer.

== Biography ==
His first appearance was in 1929 with the US Trèfileries youth team in Le Havre. He played professionally as a centre forward at US Valenciennes-Anzin from 1938 to 1939. In 1944, he moved to Lille OSC. He also played for Olympique de Marseille, SC Toulon and RC Strasbourg.

Nicknamed le taureau normand (the Norman bull) he was selected six times and scored one goal for the France national team between 1945 and 1947. During the period from 1934 to 1951 as a professional club footballer, he played 239 matches and scored a total 177 registered goals.

After his career as a player, he became a trainer at Havre AC (1953), and later at Blois.

== Honours ==
- Champion of France D1 1946 with Lille and 1948 with Marseille.
- Winner of the Coupe de France 1946 with Lille and 1951 with Strasbourg.
- Finalist Coupe de France 1945 with Lille
- Top goal scorer in the championship of France D1 1945–46 with 28 goals.
