= 1963–64 French Division 2 =

25th season of the second-tier football league in France

Division 2
- Season: 1963–64

Statistics of Division 2 in the 1963–64 season.

== Overview ==
It was contested by 18 teams, and Lille won the championship, after Le Havre was disqualified.

== League standings ==
Pos	Team	Pld	W	D	L	GF	GA	GD	Pts	Promotion or relegation
1	Lille	34	22	6	6	62	29	+33	50	Promoted
2	Sochaux-Montbéliard	34	16	12	6	62	39	+23	44	Promoted
3	FC Metz	34	15	11	8	54	40	+14	41	
4	Toulon	34	19	3	12	55	43	+12	41	Promoted
5	Olympique Marseille	34	15	10	9	59	57	+2	40	
6	Grenoble	34	14	11	9	46	36	+10	39	
7	Le Havre	34	14	8	12	58	55	+3	36	
8	Montpellier	34	12	11	11	55	57	−2	35	
9	Limoges	34	14	7	13	53	58	−5	35	
10	Aix-en-Provence	34	13	8	13	45	40	+5	34	
11	Red Star Paris	34	11	10	13	53	61	−8	32	
12	Besançon	34	9	11	14	46	56	−10	29	
13	Cannes	34	10	8	16	47	54	−7	28	
14	Cherbourg	34	8	12	14	55	69	−14	28	
15	US Boulogne	34	9	9	16	50	61	−11	27	
16	Nancy	34	10	7	17	45	61	−16	27	
17	Forbach	34	6	14	14	28	42	−14	26	
18	Béziers	34	5	10	19	23	47	−24	20	

Source: rsssf.com
