= François Bourbotte =

French footballer (1913-1972)

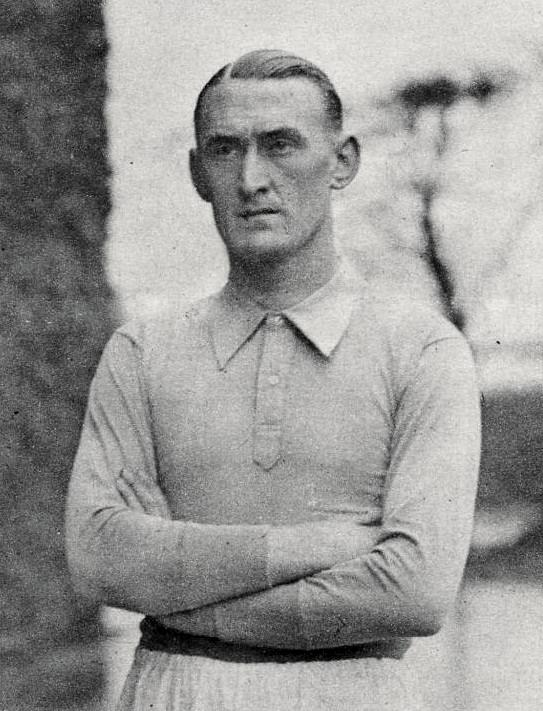
- Bourbotte in 1938

Personal information
- Date of birth: 24 February 1913
- Place of birth: Loison-sous-Lens, France
- Date of death: 15 December 1972 (aged 59)
- Positions: Defender; midfielder

Senior career*
Years	Team	Apps	(Gls)
1932–1934	Bully		
1934–1939	SC Fives		
1939–1940	Excelsior AC Roubaix		
1940–1943	SC Fives		
1943–1944	Lille-Flandres		
1944–1947	Lille		
1947–1949	Armentières		

International career
1937–1942	France	17	(0)

Managerial career
- 1950–1956: Boulogne
- * Club domestic league appearances and goals

François Bourbotte (24 February 1913 – 15 December 1972) was a French professional footballer who played as a defender and midfielder. He made 17 appearances for the France national team between 1937 and 1942.

== Gallery ==
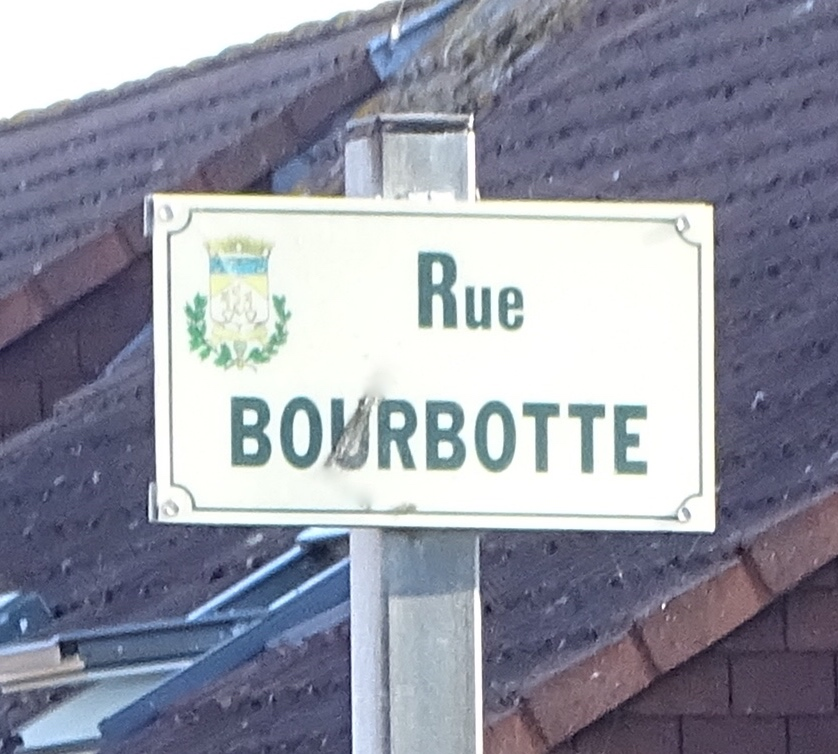
Bourbotte Street, in Loison-sous-Lens
