= List of Coupe de France finals =

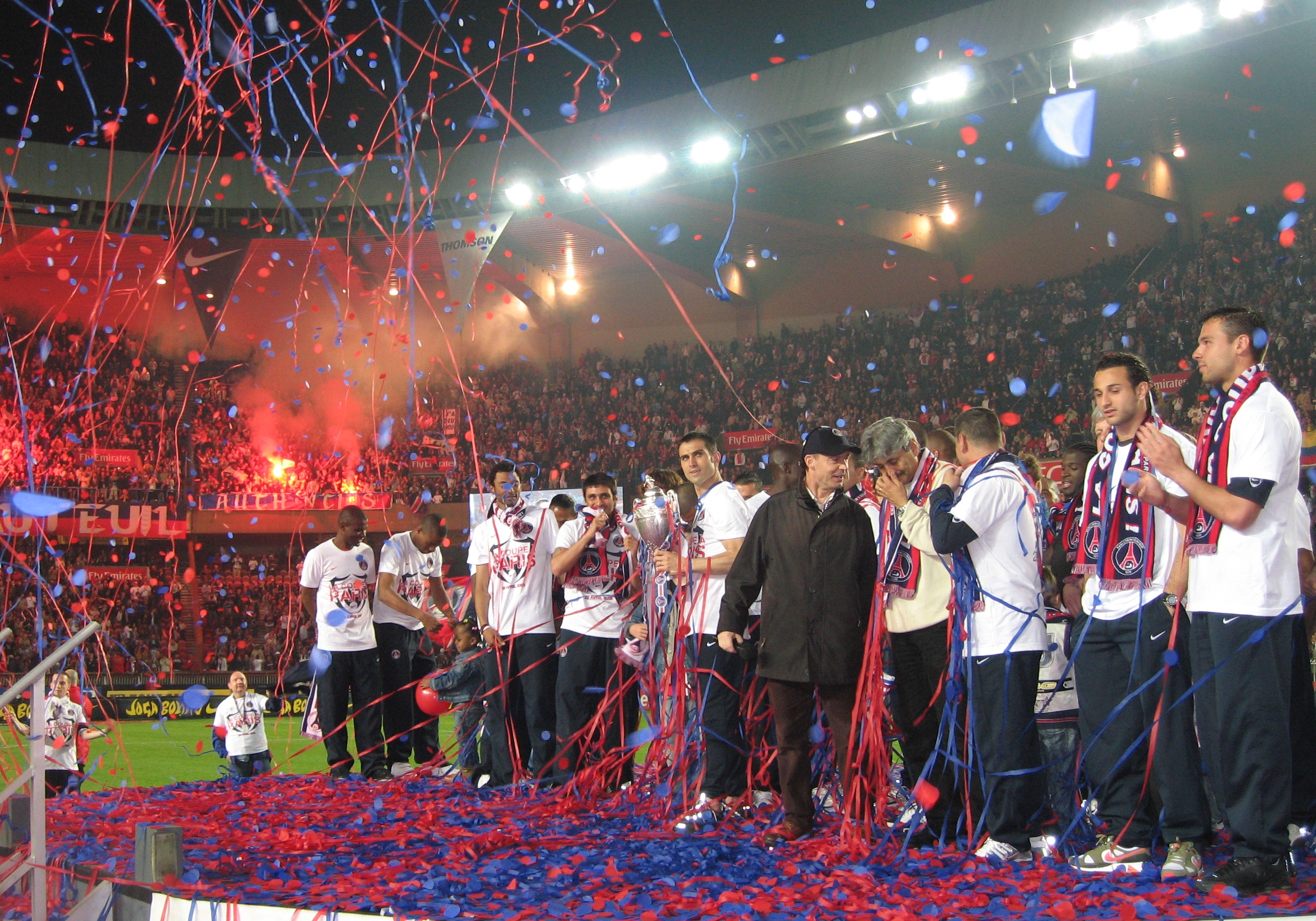
Paris Saint-Germain celebrating their seventh Coupe de France title in 2006.

The Coupe Charles Simon, commonly known as the Coupe de France, is a knockout cup competition in French football organized by the French Football Federation. The competition began in 1919 and is open to all amateur and professional football clubs in France, including clubs based in the overseas departments and territories. The competition culminates in May with the final, which is held at the Stade de France, the country's national stadium. Since 1927, the President of France has always attended the cup final and presented the trophy to the winning team's captain.

As of 2026, 35 clubs have lifted the trophy; Paris Saint-Germain have the most titles of these clubs with 16 victories. They are followed by Marseille, who have 10, and Saint-Étienne, who have six. The current champions are Lens, who defeated Nice 3–1 in the 2026 final.

== Finals ==
Date	Winners	Result	Runners-up	Venues	Attendance	Entries
5 May 1918	Olympique de Pantin	3–0	FC Lyon	Rue Olivier-de-Serres	2,000	48
6 April 1919	CASG Paris	3–2 (a.e.t.)	Olympique de Pantin	Parc des Princes	10,000	60
9 May 1920	CA Paris	2–1	Le Havre	Stade Bergeyre	7,000	114
24 April 1921	Red Star	2–1	Olympique de Pantin	Stade Pershing	18,000	202
7 May 1922	Red Star	2–0	Rennes	Stade Pershing	25,000	249
6 May 1923	Red Star	4–2	Sète	Stade Pershing	20,000	304
13 April 1924	Marseille	3–2 (a.e.t.)	Sète	Stade Pershing	29,000	325
26 April 1925	CASG Paris	1–1 (a.e.t.)	FC Rouen	Colombes	18,000	326
10 May 1925	CASG Paris	3–2 Replay	FC Rouen	Colombes	18,000	326
9 May 1926	Marseille	4–1	AS Valentigney	Colombes	26,000	336
6 May 1927	Marseille	3–0	US Quevilly	Colombes	23,800	346
6 May 1928	Red Star	3–1	CA Paris	Colombes	30,000	336
5 May 1929	Montpellier	2–0	Sète	Colombes	25,000	380
27 April 1930	Sète	3–1 (a.e.t.)	RC Paris	Colombes	35,000	408
3 May 1931	Club Français	3–0	Montpellier	Colombes	30,000	423
24 April 1932	Cannes	1–0	RC Roubaix	Colombes	36,143	438
7 May 1933	Excelsior AC	3–1	RC Roubaix	Colombes	33,000	472
6 May 1934	Sète	2–1	Marseille	Colombes	40,600	540
5 May 1935	Marseille	3–0	Rennes	Colombes	40,008	567
3 May 1936	RC Paris	1–0	FCO Charleville (Level 2)	Colombes	39,725	636
9 May 1937	FC Sochaux	2–1	Strasbourg	Colombes	39,538	658
8 May 1938	Marseille	2–1 (a.e.t.)	Metz	Parc des Princes	33,044	679
14 May 1939	RC Paris	3–1	Lille	Colombes	52,431	727
5 May 1940	RC Paris	2–1	Marseille	Parc des Princes	25,969	778
25 May 1941	Girondins de Bordeaux	2–0	SC Fives	Saint-Ouen	15,230	236
17 May 1942	Red Star	2–0	Sète	Colombes	40,000	469
9 May 1943	Marseille	2–2 (a.e.t.)	Bordeaux	Colombes	32,500	664
22 May 1943	Marseille	4–0 Replay	Bordeaux	Colombes	32,212	664
7 May 1944	ÉF Nancy-Lorraine	4–0	ÉF Reims-Champagne	Parc des Princes	31,995	772
6 May 1945	RC Paris	3–0	Lille	Colombes	49,983	510
26 May 1946	Lille	4–2	Red Star	Colombes	59,692	811
11 May 1947	Lille	2–0	Strasbourg	Colombes	59,852	922
10 May 1948	Lille	3–2	Lens (Level 2)	Colombes	60,739	933
8 May 1949	RC Paris	5–2	Lille	Colombes	61,473	981
14 May 1950	Reims	2–0	RC Paris	Colombes	61,722	977
6 May 1951	Strasbourg	3–0	Valenciennes (Level 2)	Colombes	61,492	1,010
4 May 1952	Nice	5–3	Bordeaux	Colombes	61,485	1,024
31 May 1953	Lille	2–1	FC Nancy	Colombes	58,993	1,035
23 May 1954	Nice	2–1	Marseille	Colombes	56,803	1,072
29 May 1955	Lille	5–2	Bordeaux	Colombes	49,411	1,165
27 May 1956	CS Sedan	3–1	AS Troyes-Savinienne	Colombes	47,258	1,203
26 May 1957	Toulouse	6–3	Angers	Colombes	43,125	1,149
18 May 1958	Reims	3–1	Nîmes	Colombes	56,523	1,163
3 May 1959	Le Havre (Level 2)	2–2 (a.e.t.)	Sochaux	Colombes	50,778	1,159
18 May 1959	Le Havre (Level 2)	3–0 Replay	Sochaux	Colombes	36,655	1,159
15 May 1960	Monaco	4–2 (a.e.t.)	Saint-Étienne	Colombes	38,298	1,187
7 May 1961	CS Sedan	3–1	Nîmes	Colombes	39,070	1,193
13 May 1962	Saint-Étienne	1–0	FC Nancy	Colombes	30,654	1,226
12 May 1963	Monaco	0–0 (a.e.t.)	Lyon	Colombes	32,923	1,209
23 May 1963	Monaco	2–0 Replay	Lyon	Parc des Princes	24,910	1,209
10 May 1964	Lyon	2–0	Bordeaux	Colombes	32,777	1,203
23 May 1965	Rennes	2–2 (a.e.t.)	CS Sedan	Parc des Princes	36,789	1,183
26 May 1965	Rennes	3–1 Replay	CS Sedan	Parc des Princes	26,792	1,183
22 May 1966	Strasbourg	1–0	Nantes	Parc des Princes	36,285	1,190
21 May 1967	Lyon	3–1	Sochaux	Parc des Princes	32,523	1,378
12 May 1968	Saint-Étienne	2–1	Bordeaux	Colombes	33,959	1,378
18 May 1969	Marseille	2–0	Bordeaux	Colombes	39,460	1,377
31 May 1970	Saint-Étienne	5–0	Nantes	Colombes	32,894	1,375
20 June 1971	Rennes	1–0	Lyon	Colombes	46,801	1,383
4 June 1972	Marseille	2–1	Bastia	Parc des Princes	44,069	1,596
17 June 1973	Lyon	2–1	Nantes	Parc des Princes	45,734	1,596
8 June 1974	Saint-Étienne	2–1	Monaco	Parc des Princes	45,813	1,720
14 June 1975	Saint-Étienne	2–0	Lens	Parc des Princes	44,725	1,940
12 June 1976	Marseille	2–0	Lyon	Parc des Princes	45,661	1,977
18 June 1977	Saint-Étienne	2–1	Reims	Parc des Princes	45,454	2,084
13 May 1978	Nancy	1–0	Nice	Parc des Princes	45,998	2,544
16 June 1979	Nantes	4–1 (a.e.t.)	Auxerre (Level 2)	Parc des Princes	46,070	2,473
7 June 1980	Monaco	3–1	Orléans (Level 2)	Parc des Princes	46,136	2,473
13 June 1981	Bastia	2–1	Saint-Étienne	Parc des Princes	46,155	2,924
15 May 1982	Paris Saint-Germain	2–2 (a.e.t.) (6–5 pen.)	Saint-Étienne	Parc des Princes	46,160	3,179
11 June 1983	Paris Saint-Germain	3–2	Nantes	Parc des Princes	46,203	3,280
11 May 1984	Metz	2–0 (a.e.t.)	Monaco	Parc des Princes	45,384	3,705
8 June 1985	Monaco	1–0	Paris Saint-Germain	Parc des Princes	45,711	3,983
30 April 1986	Bordeaux	2–1 (a.e.t.)	Marseille	Parc des Princes	45,429	4,117
10 June 1987	Bordeaux	2–0	Marseille	Parc des Princes	45,145	4,964
11 June 1988	Metz	1–1 (a.e.t.) (5–4 pen.)	Sochaux (Level 2)	Parc des Princes	44,531	5,293
10 June 1989	Marseille	4–3	Monaco	Parc des Princes	44,448	5,293
2 June 1990	Montpellier	2–1 (a.e.t.)	RC Paris	Parc des Princes	44,067	5,972
8 June 1991	Monaco	1–0	Marseille	Parc des Princes	44,123	6,065
1992	The disaster at the Furiani Stadium in Bastia on 5 May 1992 ended the tournament.					6,343
12 June 1993	Paris Saint-Germain	3–0	Nantes	Parc des Princes	48,789	6,523
14 May 1994	Auxerre	3–0	Montpellier	Parc des Princes	45,189	6,261
13 May 1995	Paris Saint-Germain	1–0	Strasbourg	Parc des Princes	46,698	5,975
4 May 1996	Auxerre	2–1	Nîmes (Level 3)	Parc des Princes	44,921	5,847
10 May 1997	Nice	1–1 (a.e.t.) (4–3 pen.)	Guingamp	Parc des Princes	44,131	5,986
2 May 1998	Paris Saint-Germain	2–1	Lens	Stade de France	78,265	6,106
15 May 1999	Nantes	1–0	Sedan (Level 2)	Stade de France	78,586	5,957
7 May 2000	Nantes	2–1	Calais RUFC (Level 4)	Stade de France	78,717	6,096
26 May 2001	Strasbourg	0–0 (a.e.t.) (5–4 pen.)	Amiens (Level 3)	Stade de France	78,641	6,375
11 May 2002	Lorient	1–0	Bastia	Stade de France	66,215	5,848
31 May 2003	Auxerre	2–1	Paris Saint-Germain	Stade de France	78,316	5,850
29 May 2004	Paris Saint-Germain	1–0	LB Châteauroux (Level 2)	Stade de France	78,357	6,057
4 June 2005	Auxerre	2–1	CS Sedan (Level 2)	Stade de France	78,721	6,263
29 April 2006	Paris Saint-Germain	2–1	Marseille	Stade de France	79,797	6,394
12 May 2007	Sochaux	2–2 (a.e.t.) (5–4 pen.)	Marseille	Stade de France	79,850	6,577
24 May 2008	Lyon	1–0	Paris Saint-Germain	Stade de France	79,204	6,734
9 May 2009	Guingamp (Level 2)	2–1	Rennes	Stade de France	80,056	7,246
1 May 2010	Paris Saint-Germain	1–0 (a.e.t.)	Monaco	Stade de France	74,000	7,317
14 May 2011	Lille	1–0	Paris Saint-Germain	Stade de France	79,000	7,449
28 April 2012	Lyon	1–0	US Quevilly (Level 3)	Stade de France	76,293	7,422
31 May 2013	Bordeaux	3–2	Evian	Stade de France	77,000	7,656
3 May 2014	Guingamp	2–0	Rennes	Stade de France	80,000	7,656
30 May 2015	Paris Saint-Germain	1–0	Auxerre (Level 2)	Stade de France	80,000	8,506
21 May 2016	Paris Saint-Germain	4–2	Marseille	Stade de France	80,000	8,506
27 May 2017	Paris Saint-Germain	1–0	Angers	Stade de France	78,000	8,506
8 May 2018	Paris Saint-Germain	2–0	Les Herbiers (Level 3)	Stade de France	73,772	8,506
27 April 2019	Rennes	2–2 (a.e.t.) (6–5 pen.)	Paris Saint-Germain	Stade de France	75,000	8,506
24 July 2020	Paris Saint-Germain	1–0	Saint-Étienne	Stade de France	2,805 (Note: The final was played in front of 2,805 spectators due to the COVID-19 pandemic in France.)	8,506
19 May 2021	Paris Saint-Germain	2–0	Monaco	Stade de France	0 (Note: The final was played behind closed doors due to the COVID-19 pandemic in France.)	7,378
7 May 2022	Nantes	1–0	Nice	Stade de France	78,961	7,307
29 April 2023	Toulouse	5–1	Nantes	Stade de France	78,038	7,292
25 May 2024	Paris Saint-Germain	2–1	Lyon	Stade Pierre-Mauroy	46,577	5,271
24 May 2025	Paris Saint-Germain	3–0	Reims	Stade de France	77,101	5,138
22 May 2026	Lens	3–1	Nice	Stade de France	24,672	5,162

== Performance by club ==
Club	Winners	Runners-up	Years won	Years runner-up
Paris Saint-Germain	16	5	1982, 1983, 1993, 1995, 1998, 2004, 2006, 2010, 2015, 2016, 2017, 2018, 2020, 2021, 2024, 2025	1985, 2003, 2008, 2011, 2019
Marseille	10	9	1924, 1926, 1927, 1935, 1938, 1943, 1969, 1972, 1976, 1989	1934, 1940, 1954, 1986, 1987, 1991, 2006, 2007, 2016
Saint-Étienne	6	4	1962, 1968, 1970, 1974, 1975, 1977	1960, 1981, 1982, 2020
Lille	6	3	1946, 1947, 1948, 1953, 1955, 2011	1939, 1945, 1949
Monaco	5	5	1960, 1963, 1980, 1985, 1991	1974, 1984, 1989, 2010, 2021
Lyon	5	4	1964, 1967, 1973, 2008, 2012	1963, 1971, 1976, 2024
RC Paris	5	3	1936, 1939, 1940, 1945, 1949	1930, 1950, 1990
Red Star	5	1	1921, 1922, 1923, 1928, 1942	1946
Bordeaux	4	6	1941, 1986, 1987, 2013	1943, 1952, 1955, 1964, 1968, 1969
Nantes	4	6	1979, 1999, 2000, 2022	1966, 1970, 1973, 1983, 1993, 2023
Auxerre	4	2	1994, 1996, 2003, 2005	1979, 2015
Rennes	3	4	1965, 1971, 2019	1922, 1935, 2009, 2014
Strasbourg	3	3	1951, 1966, 2001	1937, 1947, 1995
Nice	3	3	1952, 1954, 1997	1978, 2022, 2026
Sète	2	4	1930, 1934	1923, 1924, 1929, 1942
Sedan	2	3	1956, 1961	1965, 1999, 2005
Sochaux	2	3	1937, 2007	1959, 1967, 1988
Montpellier	2	2	1929, 1990	1931, 1994
Reims	2	2	1950, 1958	1977, 2025
Metz	2	1	1984, 1988	1938
Guingamp	2	1	2009, 2014	1997
CASG Paris	2	–	1919, 1925	
Lens	1	3	2026	1948, 1975, 1998
Olympique de Paris	1	2	1918	1919, 1921
Bastia	1	2	1981	1972, 2002
CA Paris	1	1	1920	1928
Le Havre	1	1	1959	1920
Club Français	1	–	1931	
Cannes	1	–	1932	
Roubaix	1	–	1933	
Nancy-Lorraine	1	–	1944	
Toulouse (1937)	1	–	1957	
Nancy	1	–	1978	
Lorient	1	–	2002	
Toulouse	1	–	2023	
Nîmes	–	3		1958, 1961, 1996
US Quevilly	–	2		1927, 2012
RC Roubaix	–	2		1932, 1933
FC Nancy	–	2		1953, 1962
Angers	–	2		1957, 2017
FC Lyon	–	1		1918
FC Rouen	–	1		1925
AS Valentigney	–	1		1926
FCO Charleville	–	1		1936
SC Fives	–	1		1941
ÉF Reims-Champagne	–	1		1944
Valenciennes	–	1		1951
AS Troyes-Savinienne	–	1		1956
Orléans	–	1		1980
Calais RUFC	–	1		2000
Amiens	–	1		2001
LB Châteauroux	–	1		2004
Evian	–	1		2013
Les Herbiers	–	1		2018
