= Marcel Le Borgne =

French footballer (1939–2007)

Personal information
- Date of birth: 9 September 1939
- Place of birth: Carhaix, France
- Date of death: 6 December 2007 (aged 68)
- Place of death: Vienne, France
- Height: 1.75 m (5 ft 9 in)
- Position: Defensive midfielder

Youth career
- –1956: Racing Besançon

Senior career*
Years	Team	Apps	(Gls)
1956–1960	Lyon	34	(0)
1960–1961	Racing Besançon	9	(0)
1961–1969	Lyon	229	(7)
1969–1970	SA Thiers		
Total		272+	(7+)

Managerial career
- Pont-de-Chéruy
- Saint-Priest
- 1970–1976: Concarneau
- 1983–1984: FC Bourges
- 1988: Lyon
- * Club domestic league appearances and goals

Marcel Le Borgne (9 September 1939 – 6 December 2007) was a French footballer and manager.

== Career ==
Le Borgne joined Lyon in 1956 from Racing Besançon. He later played in Lyon's first ever European match, a 7–0 defeat in the 1958–1960 Inter-Cities Fairs Cup against Inter Milan. In total, he made 324 appearances for Lyon, and helped them win two Coupe de France titles in 1964 and 1967, and reach a European semi-final against Sporting CP in the 1963–64 European Cup Winners' Cup.

In 1970, he was appointed the manager of US Concarneau, helping them reach the French Division 3 before departing in 1976. In March 1988, he was appointed as the manager of Lyon, being the third since Jean-Michel Aulas became owner in June 1987. He only coached seven matches in the French Division 2 to help them finish in second, before they hired Raymond Domenech for the following season.

== Death ==
Le Borgne died on 6 December 2007, at the age of 68.

== Honours ==
Lyon

- Coupe de France: 1963–64, 1966–67; runner-up: 1962–63
