= 1964 Coupe de France final =

- Event: 1963–64 Coupe de France
Lyon	Bordeaux
2	0
- Date: 10 May 1964
- Venue: Olympique Yves-du-Manoir, Colombes
- Referee: Henri Faucheux
- Attendance: 32,777

The 1964 Coupe de France final was a football match held at Stade Olympique Yves-du-Manoir, Colombes on May 10, 1964, that saw Olympique Lyonnais defeat FC Girondins de Bordeaux 2–0 thanks to goals by Néstor Combin.

== Match details ==
10 May 1964

Lyon	2–0	Bordeaux
Combin 11', 26'

Stade Olympique Yves-du-Manoir, Colombes
Attendance: 32,777
Referee: Henri Faucheux

GK	(France) Marcel Aubour
DF	(France) Jean Djorkaeff
DF	(France) Aimé Mignot	(c)
DF	(France) Lucien Degeorges
DF	(France) Thadée Polak
MF	(France) Marcel Le Borgne
MF	(France) Jean Dumas
MF	(France) Fleury Di Nallo
FW	(France) (Argentina) Néstor Combin
FW	(France) Guy Hatchi
FW	(France) (Argentina) Angel Rambert
Manager:
(France) Lucien Jasseron Assistant Referees: Fourth Official:

GK	(France) Jean-Claude Ranouilh
DF	(France) Gilbert Moevi
DF	(France) André Chorda
DF	(Morocco) Francisco Navarro
DF	(France) Claude Rey
MF	(France) Guy Calleja
MF	(Mali) Karounga Keita
MF	(Cameroon) Gabriel Abossolo
FW	(France) (Argentina) Héctor De Bourgoing
FW	(France) Aimé Gori
FW	(France) Laurent Robuschi	(c)
Manager:
(Spain) Salvador Artigas

== See also ==
- Coupe de France 1963-64
