= 1967 Coupe de France final =

Football match

- Event: 1966–67 Coupe de France
Lyon	Sochaux
3	1
- Date: 21 May 1967
- Venue: Parc des Princes, Paris
- Referee: Robert Lacoste
- Attendance: 32,523

The 1967 Coupe de France final was a football match held at Stade Olympique Yves-du-Manoir, Colombes on May 21, 1967, that saw Olympique Lyonnais defeat FC Sochaux-Montbéliard 3–1 thanks to goals by Angel Rambert, André Perrin and Fleury Di Nallo.

== Match details ==
21 May 1967

Lyon	3–1	Sochaux
Rambert 22'; Perrin 81'; Di Nallo 89'		Leclerc 33'

Parc des Princes, Paris
Attendance: 32,523
Referee: Robert Lacoste

GK	(France) Michel Zewulko
DF	(Luxembourg) Erwin Kuffer
DF	(France) Jacques Glyczinski
DF	(France) Marcel Le Borgne
DF	(France) Lucien Desgeorges
MF	(Argentina) Hector Maison
MF	(France) René Rocco
MF	(France) Robert Nouzaret
FW	(France) André Perrin
FW	(France) Fleury Di Nallo	(c)
FW	(France) (Argentina) Angel Rambert
Substitutes:
Manager:
(France) Louis Hon Assistant Referees: Fourth Official:

GK	(France) Eleftherios Manolios
DF	(France) Alain Marconnet
DF	(France) Jean-Marie Zimmermann
DF	(France) Claude Quittet	(c)
DF	(France) Jacques Andrieux
MF	(France) Eugène Laffon
MF	(France) Robert Dewilder
MF	(France) Louis Leclerc
FW	(France) Maryan Wisnieski
FW	(France) Guy Lassalette
FW	(Luxembourg) Adolphe Schmit
Substitutes:
Manager:
(France) Georges Vuillaume

== See also ==
- 1966–67 Coupe de France
