= Coupe de France =

Annual French football competition

- Organiser(s): French Football Federation
- Founded: 1917; 109 years ago
- Region: France
- Teams: 8,506
- Qualifier for: UEFA Europa League
- Domestic cup: Trophée des Champions
- Current champions: Lens (1st title)
- Most championships: Paris Saint-Germain (16 titles)
- Broadcaster(s): France Télévisions beIN Sports
- 2026–27 Coupe de France

The Coupe de France (French pronunciation: [kup də fʁɑ̃s]), also known in English as the French Cup or less commonly as the France Cup, is the premier knockout cup competition in French football organised by the French Football Federation (FFF). It was first held in 1917 and is open to all amateur and professional football clubs in France, including clubs based in the overseas departments and territories. Between 1917 and 1919, the competition was called the Coupe Charles Simon, in tribute of Charles Simon, a French sportsman and the founder of the French Interfederal Committee (the ancestor of the French Football Federation), who died in 1915 while serving in World War I. The final is played at the Stade de France and the winner qualifies for the league phase of the UEFA Europa League and a place in the Trophée des Champions match. A concurrent women's tournament is also held, the Coupe de France Féminine.

Combined with random draws and one-off matches (no replays), the Coupe de France can be difficult for the bigger clubs to win. The competition is usually beneficial to the amateur clubs as it forces higher-ranked clubs, usually professional clubs, to play as the away team when drawn against lower-league opposition if they are competing more than one level below them. Despite this advantage, only three amateur clubs have reached the final since professionalism was introduced in French football in 1932: Calais RUFC in 2000, US Quevilly in 2012 and Les Herbiers VF in 2018. Two clubs from outside Ligue 1 have won the competition, Le Havre in 1959 and Guingamp in 2009. The reigning champions are Lens, who defeated Nice in the final of the 2025–26 competition.

== History ==
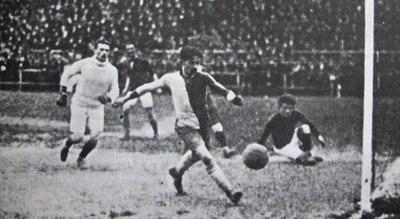
1920 final between CA Paris and Le Havre

The trophy awarded to the winners.

The Coupe de France was created on 15 January 1917 by the French Interfederal Committee (CFI), an early predecessor of the French Football Federation. The idea was pushed by the federation's general secretary Henri Delaunay and under union sacrée, the competition was declared open to all clubs, amateur and professional, though professionalism in French football at the time was non-existent. The major clubs in France objected to the notion that all clubs should be allowed to enter. However, the federation dispelled their complaints and declared the competition would remain as is. Due to the minimal requirements to enter, the first competition featured 48 clubs. By 1948, the number had increased to 1,000 and at present, the competition features more than 7,000 clubs. Due to the initial increase in clubs, the federation created preliminary rounds beginning with the 1919–20 season. The following season, they added a second preliminary round. As of today, the competition contains eight regional rounds with some regions containing as many as ten.

The first Coupe de France victors were Olympique de Pantin who defeated FC Lyon 3–0 at the Stade de la Légion Saint-Michel in Paris in front of 2,000 spectators. The following year, the competition was shifted to the Parc des Princes and drew 10,000 supporters to the final that saw CASG Paris defeat Olympique de Paris 3–2. The competition alternated between many stadiums during its early years playing at the Stade Pershing from 1920 to 1924 before switching to the Stade Olympique Yves-du-Manoir in Colombes. The competition lasted a decade there before returning to the Parc des Princes in 1938. In 1941, the final was held at the Stade de Paris. The following year, the final returned to Colombes and remained there until moving to the Parc des Princes permanently following its renovation, which made it the largest in terms of attendance in France.

There are vastly more amateur than professional clubs in France, and the competition regularly produces surprises. The best performance by an amateur club in the competition is usually awarded the Petit Poucet Plaque. One of the competition's biggest upsets occurred in February 1957 when Algerian club SCU El Biar defeated Stade de Reims who had players such as Robert Jonquet, Michel Hidalgo, Léon Glovacki, and Just Fontaine. One of the more recent successes of an amateur club occurred during the 1999–2000 competition when Championnat de France amateur club Calais RUFC reached the final. Calais, composed of doctors, dock workers, and office clerks, started the competition in the 5th round and, after defeating fellow amateurs, beat clubs Lille, Langon-Castets, Cannes, Strasbourg, and Bordeaux to advance to the final. Calais' road to the final was a prime example of the major advantages amateur clubs had with the club playing all of its matches at home beginning with the Round of 64 match. In the final the club lost to Nantes 2–1 despite scoring first.

Professional clubs have continued to express their displeasure with the advantages amateur clubs receive in the competition with many of their complaints being directly associated with their hosting of matches. Coupe de France rules explicitly state that teams drawn first during the draw are granted hosting duties for the round, however, if the club drawn second is competing two levels below the club drawn first, then the hosting duties will be given to the second club drawn. Many clubs have subsequently complained that, due to the amateur clubs not having adequate funds, the stadiums they play in are extremely unkempt. The resulting differences led to the clubs represented by the Ligue de Football Professionnel forming their own cup competition, the Coupe de la Ligue. More recently, amateur clubs have begun to move to more established stadiums for their Coupe de France matches with their primary reason being to earn more money at the gate due to more established stadiums having the ability to carry more spectators.

The winner of the Coupe de France trophy normally holds on to the trophy for one year to put in on display at their headquarters before returning it to the French Football Federation. In the early 1980s, the cup was stolen, but was retrieved by the authorities quickly. Since 1927, the President of France has always attended the cup final and presented the trophy to the winning team's captain. Gaston Doumergue was the first French president to attend the final.

== Competition format ==
Similar to other countries' cup competitions, the Coupe de France is a knockout tournament with pairings for each round drawn at random. Each tie is played through a single leg. If a match ends in a draw, penalties are held. Prior to 1967, the competition had no extra time nor penalty shootouts and instead allowed replays, similar to the FA Cup. This style was abandoned following three straight draws between Olympique Lyonnais and amateur club Angoulême CFC, which resulted in the federation flipping a coin to decide which club advanced. For the 1968–69 season, extra time was introduced and, two years later, the penalty shootout was instituted. Following the 1974–75 season, replays were scrapped.

There are a total of 14 rounds in the competition. However, rounds in the competition are determined through each region in France with one of the main reasons being to reduce travel costs. Depending on the region, the number of rounds may vary from four to as many as eight with each region sending a set number of clubs to the 7th round. The regions conduct rounds of matches up until the 7th round when professional clubs enter the competition. All of the clubs are then split and drawn against each other randomly, regardless of regional affiliation though geographical pots are made prior to the draw. In the overseas departments and territories, territories such as Guadeloupe, Martinique, French Guiana, and Réunion establish their own knockout competition, similar to the regions in France, though only one club from each region is allowed to enter. This number later rose to two for some overseas regions. Territories like Mayotte, French Polynesia, and New Caledonia allow the winner of their cup competitions to enter the 7th round, such as when AS Mont-Dore won the 2009 edition of the New Caledonia Cup to earn qualification for the 2009–10 Coupe de France.

As well as being presented with the trophy, the winning team also qualifies for the UEFA Europa League. If the winner has already qualified for the UEFA Champions League via the league, the UEFA Europa League place goes to the next highest placed finisher in the league table. Overseas teams are also eligible for UEFA qualification.

=== Format for the 2026–27 Coupe de France ===
- In the first three rounds the teams from district and regional leagues enter.
- National 2 teams enter at the third round stage.
- National 1 teams enter at the fourth round stage.
- Ligue 3 teams enter at the fifth round stage.
- Ligue 2 teams enter at the seventh round stage.
- Ligue 1 teams enter at the round of 64 stage.

== Numbering ==
In Coupe de France matches, players are restricted to wearing the shirt numbers 1–20 regardless of the player's squad number. The starters are given the numbers 1–11. Currently, matches from quarter-finals onward allow players to wear their own numbers in their clubs.

== Overseas teams ==
The cup was open to overseas teams starting in the 1961–62 season. In the 1974–75 season, the Golden Star was the first overseas team to beat a mainland team. The Martinique club beat US Melun 2–1 in the replay after 1–1 in the first game. The Golden Star was then the first overseas team to reach the round of 64. In the 1988–89 season, Le Geldar de Kourou was the first overseas team to reach the round of 32. In the 2019–20 season, JS Saint-Pierroise was the second overseas team to reach the round of 32. In the following season, Club Franciscain was the third overseas team to reach the round of 32.

== Sponsorship ==
The Coupe de France does not have a primary sponsor of the competition, but allows sponsors of the French Football Federation to showcase themselves on club's kits at the expense of the club's sponsors. Among them include SFR, Caisse d'Épargne, Crédit Agricole, Sita-Suez, Carrefour, LG, Hyundai, and Coca-Cola.

== Records ==
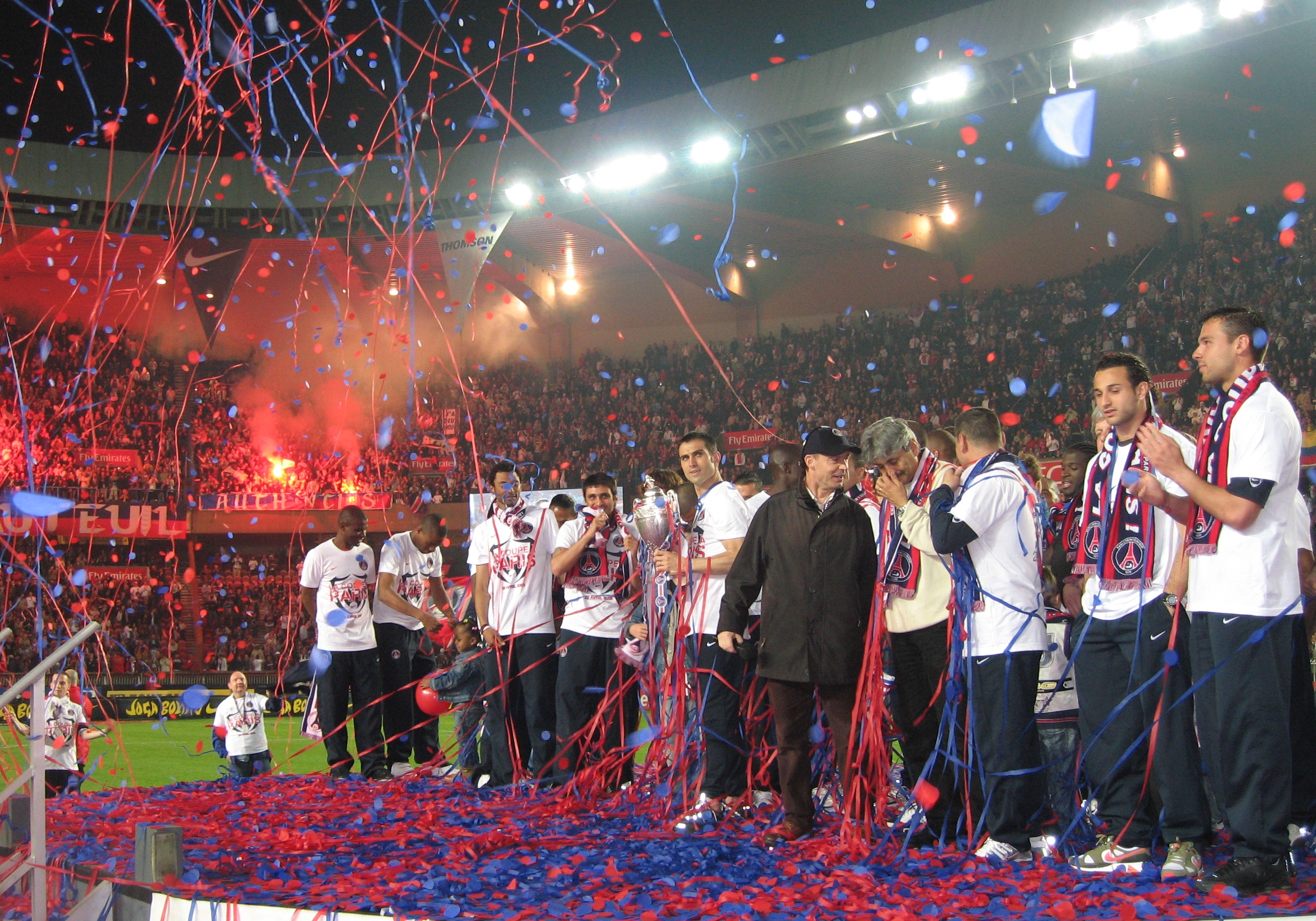
Paris Saint-Germain celebrating their seventh Coupe de France title in 2006

As of 2025, Paris Saint-Germain is the most successful team in the history of the competition, with sixteen Coupe de France titles. PSG also has appeared in the most finals, having played in 21 finals, losing 5. The Parisian club won a cup 'double' (i.e. the Coupe de France and the Coupe de la Ligue in the same season) in 1995, 1998, 2015, 2016, 2017, 2018, and 2020. The team also won a league-cup double in 2024. PSG also won domestic trebles in 2015, 2016, 2018 and 2020. The team won a continental treble in 2025.

Olympique Marseille are one of four clubs who have suffered two consecutive finals defeats, as the Bouches-du-Rhône-based club lost to Paris Saint-Germain in 2006 and then to Sochaux the following season.

Due to the early dominance of Parisian clubs during the early run of the competition and along with PSG's consistency, the Île-de-France region has the most Coupe de France champions, having produced 25. The region is followed by Provence-Alpes-Côte d'Azur, with Marseille being the region's most successful club.

Managers Guy Roux and André Cheuva share the honour of having managed four Coupe de France winning clubs. The most successful players are Marquinhos and Marco Verratti, who both won six titles. Éric Pécout of Nantes and Jean-Pierre Papin are joint top scorers of the competition final, having each converted a hat-trick in their only appearances in the ultimate match. In 1947, Roger Vandooren scored the fastest goal in the final's history converting after 29 seconds for his club Lille in their 2–0 win over Strasbourg.

== Media coverage ==
=== France ===
The Coupe de France currently has a broadcasting agreement with France Télévisions, the French public national television broadcaster and beIN Sports, the French-based Qatari premium broadcaster. Previously, Eurosport was broadcast the 1996–97 until 2021–22 season for paid TV coverage. The Coupe de France final is co-aired on France 2 since 1975 until 2030 (excluding 1984 until 2006).

==== Free ====
Television channel	Period
RTF	1955–1964
ORTF	1964–1975
France Télévisions	1975–1984
France Télévisions	2006–2030
TF1	1984–2006

==== Pay ====
Television channel	Period
Canal+	1984–2000
Eurosport	1996–2022
beIN Sports	2022–2030

== Winners ==
=== Performance by club ===
Club	Winners	Runners-up	Years won	Years runner-up
Paris Saint-Germain	16	5	1982, 1983, 1993, 1995, 1998, 2004, 2006, 2010, 2015, 2016, 2017, 2018, 2020, 2021, 2024, 2025	1985, 2003, 2008, 2011, 2019
Marseille	10	9	1924, 1926, 1927, 1935, 1938, 1943, 1969, 1972, 1976, 1989	1934, 1940, 1954, 1986, 1987, 1991, 2006, 2007, 2016
Saint-Étienne	6	4	1962, 1968, 1970, 1974, 1975, 1977	1960, 1981, 1982, 2020
Lille	6	3	1946, 1947, 1948, 1953, 1955, 2011	1939, 1945, 1949
Monaco	5	5	1960, 1963, 1980, 1985, 1991	1974, 1984, 1989, 2010, 2021
Lyon	5	4	1964, 1967, 1973, 2008, 2012	1963, 1971, 1976, 2024
RC Paris	5	3	1936, 1939, 1940, 1945, 1949	1930, 1950, 1990
Red Star	5	1	1921, 1922, 1923, 1928, 1942	1946
Bordeaux	4	6	1941, 1986, 1987, 2013	1943, 1952, 1955, 1964, 1968, 1969
Nantes	4	6	1979, 1999, 2000, 2022	1966, 1970, 1973, 1983, 1993, 2023
Auxerre	4	2	1994, 1996, 2003, 2005	1979, 2015
Rennes	3	4	1965, 1971, 2019	1922, 1935, 2009, 2014
Strasbourg	3	3	1951, 1966, 2001	1937, 1947, 1995
Nice	3	3	1952, 1954, 1997	1978, 2022, 2026
Sète	2	4	1930, 1934	1923, 1924, 1929, 1942
Sedan	2	3	1956, 1961	1965, 1999, 2005
Sochaux	2	3	1937, 2007	1959, 1967, 1988
Montpellier	2	2	1929, 1990	1931, 1994
Reims	2	2	1950, 1958	1977, 2025
Metz	2	1	1984, 1988	1938
Guingamp	2	1	2009, 2014	1997
CASG Paris	2	–	1919, 1925	
Lens	1	3	2026	1948, 1975, 1998
Olympique de Paris	1	2	1918	1919, 1921
Bastia	1	2	1981	1972, 2002
CA Paris	1	1	1920	1928
Le Havre	1	1	1959	1920
Club Français	1	–	1931	
Cannes	1	–	1932	
Roubaix	1	–	1933	
Nancy-Lorraine	1	–	1944	
Toulouse (1937)	1	–	1957	
Nancy	1	–	1978	
Lorient	1	–	2002	
Toulouse	1	–	2023	
Nîmes	–	3		1958, 1961, 1996
RC Roubaix	–	2		1932, 1933
FC Nancy	–	2		1953, 1962
US Quevilly	–	2		1927, 2012
Angers	–	2		1957, 2017
FC Lyon	–	1		1918
FC Rouen	–	1		1925
AS Valentigney	–	1		1926
FCO Charleville	–	1		1936
SC Fives	–	1		1941
ÉF Reims-Champagne	–	1		1944
Valenciennes	–	1		1951
AS Troyes-Savinienne	–	1		1956
Orléans	–	1		1980
Calais RUFC	–	1		2000
Amiens	–	1		2001
LB Châteauroux	–	1		2004
Evian	–	1		2013
Les Herbiers	–	1		2018
