= 2013 Coupe de France final =

Final of the 2012–13 edition of the Coupe de France

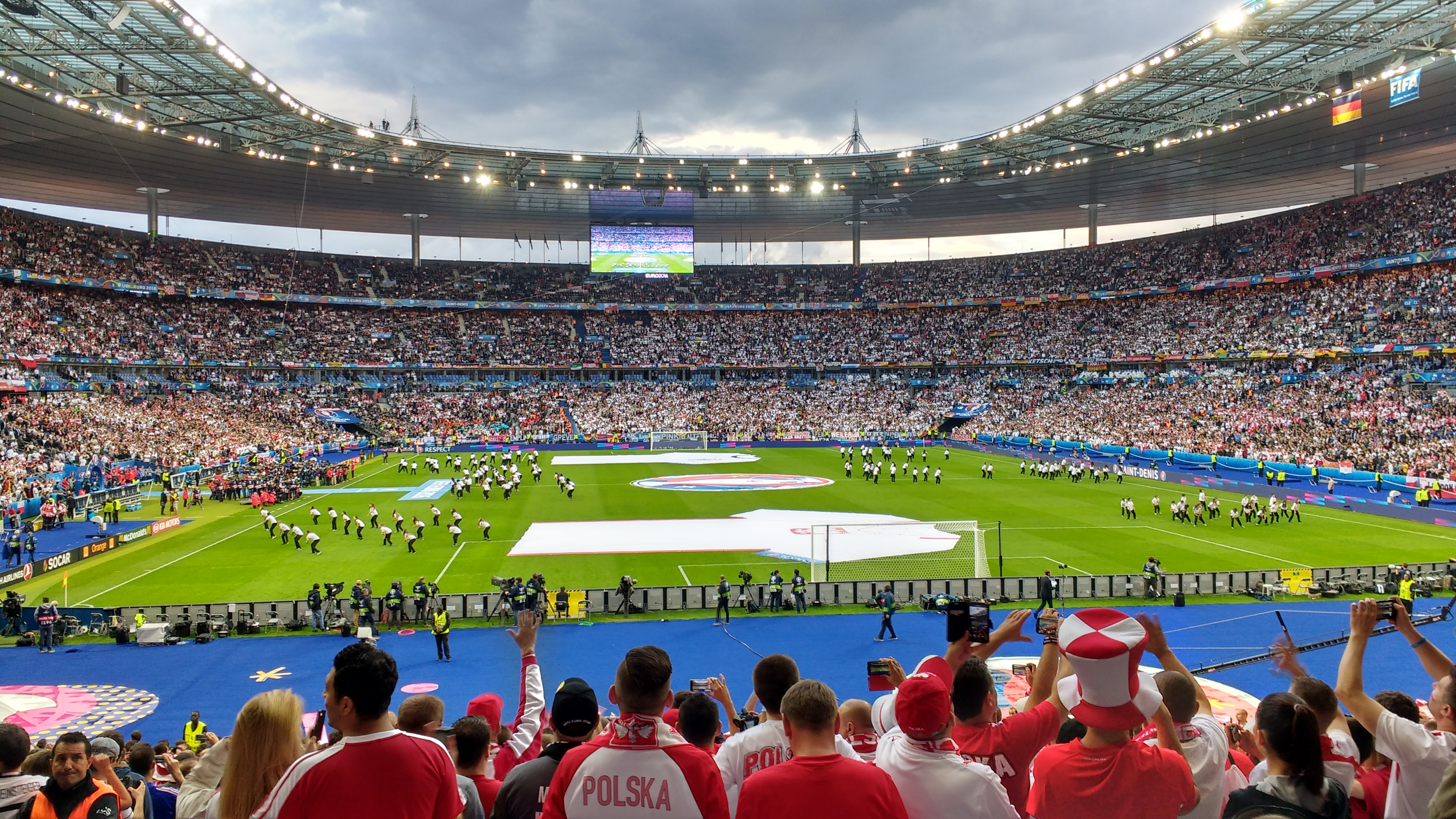
- Event: 2012–13 Coupe de France
Bordeaux	Evian
Ligue 1	Ligue 1
3	2
- Date: 31 May 2013
- Venue: Stade de France, Saint-Denis
- Referee: Fredy Fautrel
- Attendance: 77,000

The 2013 Coupe de France final was the 95th final of France's most prestigious football cup competition. The final took place on 31 May 2013 at the Stade de France in Saint-Denis and was contested between Bordeaux and Evian. The winner of the Coupe de France was guaranteed a place in the group stage of the UEFA Europa League with the club's appearance being dependent on whether it qualifies for the 2013–14 UEFA Champions League. The final was broadcast live on France 2.

Evian TG reached the final for the first time in their history. Bordeaux won their fourth Coupe de France, and first since 1987, after a 3–2 victory against Évian.

== Road to the final ==
Bordeaux			Round	Evian
Opponent	H/A	Result	2012–13 Coupe de France	Opponent	H/A	Result
Châteauroux	A	3–2	Round of 64	AC Amiens	A	1–1 (a.e.t.) (5–3 pen.)
Moulins	A	2–1	Round of 32	Vertou	A	2–0
Raon-l'Étape	A	2–2 (a.e.t.) (5–3 pen.)	Round of 16	Le Havre	H	3–1
Lens	A	3–2	Quarter-finals	Paris Saint-Germain	H	1–1 (a.e.t.) (4–1 pen.)
Troyes	A	2–1	Semi-finals	Lorient	H	4–0

== Match ==
=== Summary ===
Bordeaux opened the scoring in the 39th minute when Cheick Diabaté went around Evian goalkeeper Bertrand Laquait to slot home. Bordeaux were awarded a penalty a minute into the second half when Diabaté was brought down, but Laquait saved the spot kick with a one-handed stop down to his left from Diabaté. Evian equalised in the 51st minute when Yannick Sagbo controlled the ball on his chest before finishing from close range. Bordeaux went ahead again two minutes later when Henri Saivet scored from five yards out. In the 70th minute the scores were level again when Brice Dja Djedje finished at the back post after a cross from the left. With one minute remaining, Diabaté got the winning goal when he scored from seven yards out, after being played in by Nicolas Maurice-Belay.

31 May 2013
20:45 CEST

Bordeaux	3–2	Evian
Diabaté 39', 89'; Saivet 53'	Report	Sagbo 51'; Dja Djédjé 70'

Stade de France, Saint-Denis
Attendance: 77,000
Referee: Fredy Fautrel (Basse Normandie)

GK	16	(France) Cédric Carrasso
RB	25	(Brazil) Mariano	(yellow card) 20'
CB	6	(Senegal) Ludovic Sané
CB	3	(Brazil) Henrique
LB	28	(France) Benoît Trémoulinas
CM	26	(France) Grégory Sertic
CM	18	(Czech Republic) Jaroslav Plašil (c)		(substituted off) 67'
CM	4	(Poland) Ludovic Obraniak
LW	20	(France) Henri Saivet
RW	19	(France) Nicolas Maurice-Belay
FW	14	(Mali) Cheick Diabaté
Substitutes:
GK	30	(Martinique) Kévin Olimpa
DF	23	(France) Florian Marange
DF	27	(France) Marc Planus
MF	8	(Tunisia) Fahid Ben Khalfallah
MF	17	(Gabon) André Biyogo Poko		(substituted on) 67'
MF	22	(France) Julien Faubert
MF	24	(Mali) Abdou Traoré
Manager:
(France) Francis Gillot

GK	16	(France) Bertrand Laquait
RB	26	(Ivory Coast) Brice Dja Djédjé
CB	3	(Brazil) Betão
CB	22	(France) Cédric Cambon (c)
LB	18	(Denmark) Daniel Wass
CM	2	(Ghana) Mohammed Rabiu		(substituted off) 83'
CM	24	(France) Olivier Sorlin	(yellow card) 29'
CM	23	(Serbia) Miloš Ninković		(substituted off) 60'
RW	9	(France) Kévin Bérigaud
LW	29	(Tunisia) Saber Khlifa
FW	20	(Ivory Coast) Yannick Sagbo		(substituted off) 90+1'
Substitutes:
GK	1	(France) Johann Durand
DF	17	(France) Aldo Angoula		(substituted on) 90+1'
DF	21	(Democratic Republic of the Congo) Cédric Mongongu
DF	28	(France) Fabrice Ehret
MF	4	(Ivory Coast) Éric Tié Bi		(substituted on) 83'
MF	14	(France) Cédric Barbosa		(substituted on) 60'
MF	19	(France) Guillaume Lacour
Manager:
(France) Pascal Dupraz

Match officials

- Assistant referees:
  - Cyril Gringoire (Basse Normandie)
  - Alexandre Viala (Midi-Pyrénées)
- Fourth official: Emmanuel Boisdenghien (Île-de-France)
- Additional assistant referees:
  - Clément Turpin (Bourgogne)
  - Nicolas Rainville (Languedoc-Roussillon)

Man of the Match

- Cheick Diabaté (Bordeaux)

Match rules

- 90 minutes
- 30 minutes of extra-time if necessary
- Penalty shoot-out if scores still level
- Seven named substitutes
- Maximum of three substitutions

== See also ==
- 2012–13 Coupe de France
