= René Girard (footballer) =

French footballer and manager (born 1954)

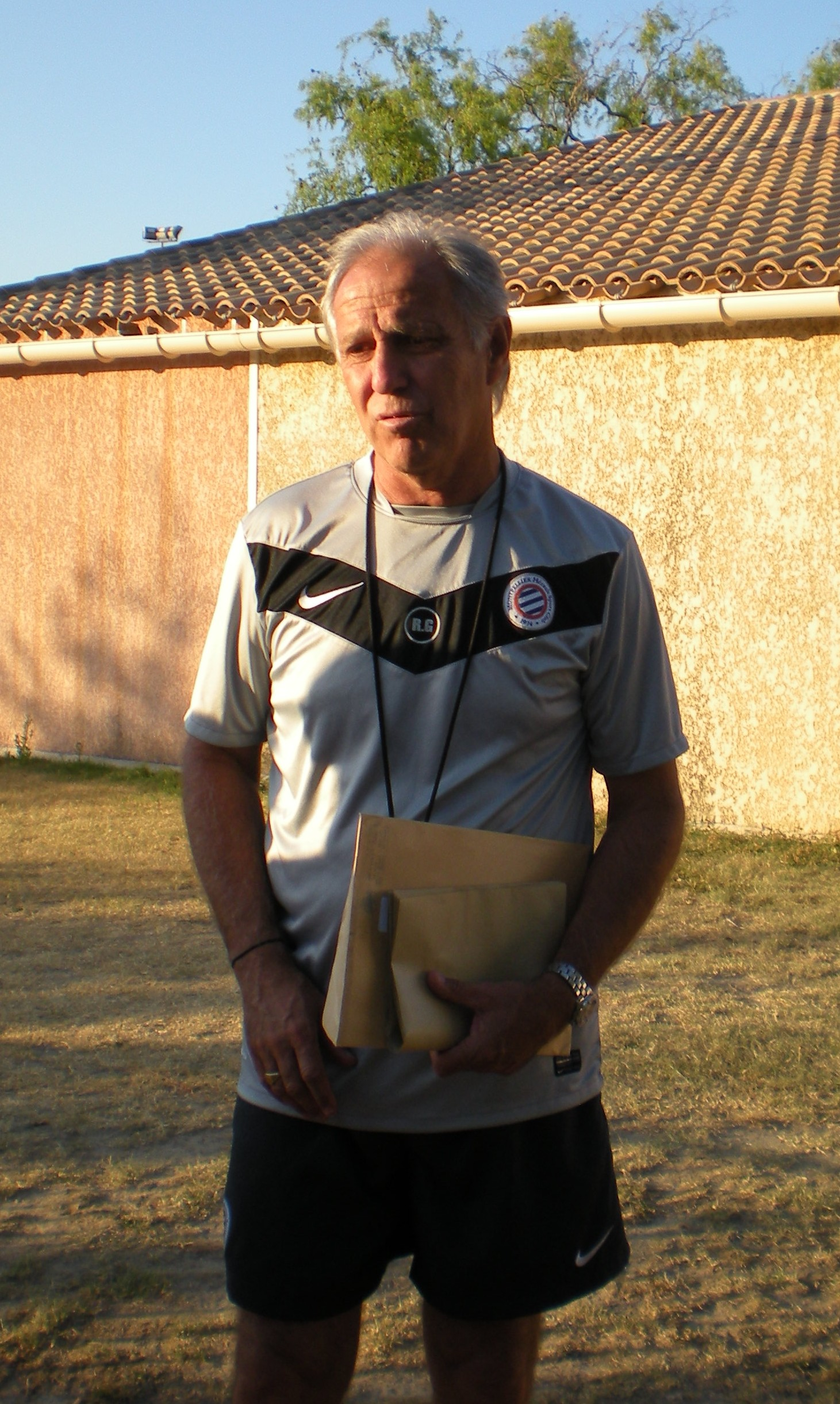
- Girard in 2012

Personal information
- Full name: René Émile Girard
- Date of birth: 4 April 1954 (age 72)
- Place of birth: Vauvert, Gard, France
- Height: 1.78 m (5 ft 10 in)
- Position: Defensive midfielder

Senior career*
Years	Team	Apps	(Gls)
1973–1980	Nîmes	202	(27)
1980–1988	Bordeaux	241	(17)
1988–1991	Nîmes	92	(5)
Total		535	(49)

International career
1981–1982	France	7	(1)

Managerial career
- 1991–1994: Nîmes
- 1996–1997: Pau FC
- 1998: Strasbourg
- 2002–2003: France U19
- 2003–2004: France U16
- 2004–2008: France U21
- 2009–2013: Montpellier
- 2013–2015: Lille
- 2016: Nantes
- 2018: Wydad AC
- 2020–2021: Paris FC
- * Club domestic league appearances and goals

René Émile Girard (born 4 April 1954) is a French football manager and former player.

== Early life ==
René Émile Girard was born on 4 April 1954 in Vauvert, Gard.

== Playing career ==
Girard won seven caps, scoring one goal for France and was a member of the squad that finished fourth at the 1982 World Cup. At club level, while playing for Bordeaux, Girard won three Ligue 1 titles – in 1983–84, 1984–85 and 1986–87, as well as two Coupes de France, over Marseille in the 1986 and 1987 editions.

== Coaching career ==
Girard managed Nîmes, Strasbourg, Pau FC and multiple France youth teams. He coached the France national under-21 team from 2004 to 2008.

On 3 June 2009, he became the new head coach of Montpellier HSC, replacing Rolland Courbis. In the 2011–12 season, Montpellier shocked the footballing world by winning its first Ligue 1 title, finishing the season with 82 points, three more than runner-up Paris Saint-Germain. He said after his team won it. "I think our triumph is a real shot in the arm for French football. "It just goes to show that everyone can beat everyone and that money isn't the be-all and end-all. We're a club of mates, a club that brings young players through and gives them a chance. "At the end of the day, it's worked out well for us. We played some great football, with a well-balanced team and I'm overwhelmed."

He signed for Lille in July 2013, replacing Rudi Garcia who left for Roma.

On 30 September 2018, he was appointed as the head coach of Moroccan club Wydad AC.

== Honours ==
=== Player ===
Bordeaux

- Division 1: 1983–84, 1984–85, 1986–87
- Coupe de France: 1985–86, 1986–87
- Challenge des Champions: 1986

=== Manager ===
Montpellier

- Ligue 1: 2011–12
