= Yvon Le Roux =

French footballer (born 1960)

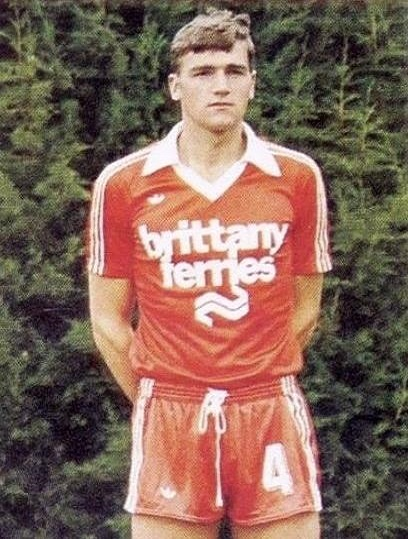
- Le Roux in 1979 with Brest

Personal information
- Date of birth: 19 March 1960 (age 66)
- Place of birth: Plouvorn, France
- Height: 1.89 m (6 ft 2 in)
- Position: Centre-back

Senior career*
Years	Team	Apps	(Gls)
1977–1983	Brest	180	(25)
1983–1985	Monaco	66	(11)
1985–1987	Nantes	82	(11)
1987–1989	Marseille	78	(4)
1989–1990	Paris Saint-Germain	15	(1)
Total		421	(52)

International career
1983–1989	France	28	(1)

Managerial career
- 1991–1993: Brest
Medal record
Representing France
UEFA European Championship
Winner	1984
CONMEBOL–UEFA Cup of Champions
Winner	1985
- * Club domestic league appearances and goals

Yvon Le Roux (born 19 March 1960) is a French former professional footballer who played as a defender. He earned 28 international caps (one goal) for the France national team during the mid-1980s and was part of the team at the 1986 FIFA World Cup and the team that won UEFA Euro 1984. Whilst at Marseille he helped them to the league and cup double in 1989.

== Early life ==
Le Roux was born on 19 March 1960 in Plouvorn, Finistère.

== International career ==
Le Roux was a member of the France national team. In the UEFA Euro 1984 Final he was sent off, but his team still managed to beat Spain 2–0.

== Honours ==
Monaco

- Coupe de France: 1984–85

Marseille

- Division 1: 1988–89
- Coupe de France: 1988–89

France

- UEFA European Championship: 1984
- Artemio Franchi Cup: 1985
