= 2008 Coupe de France final =

Final of the 2007–08 edition of the Coupe de France

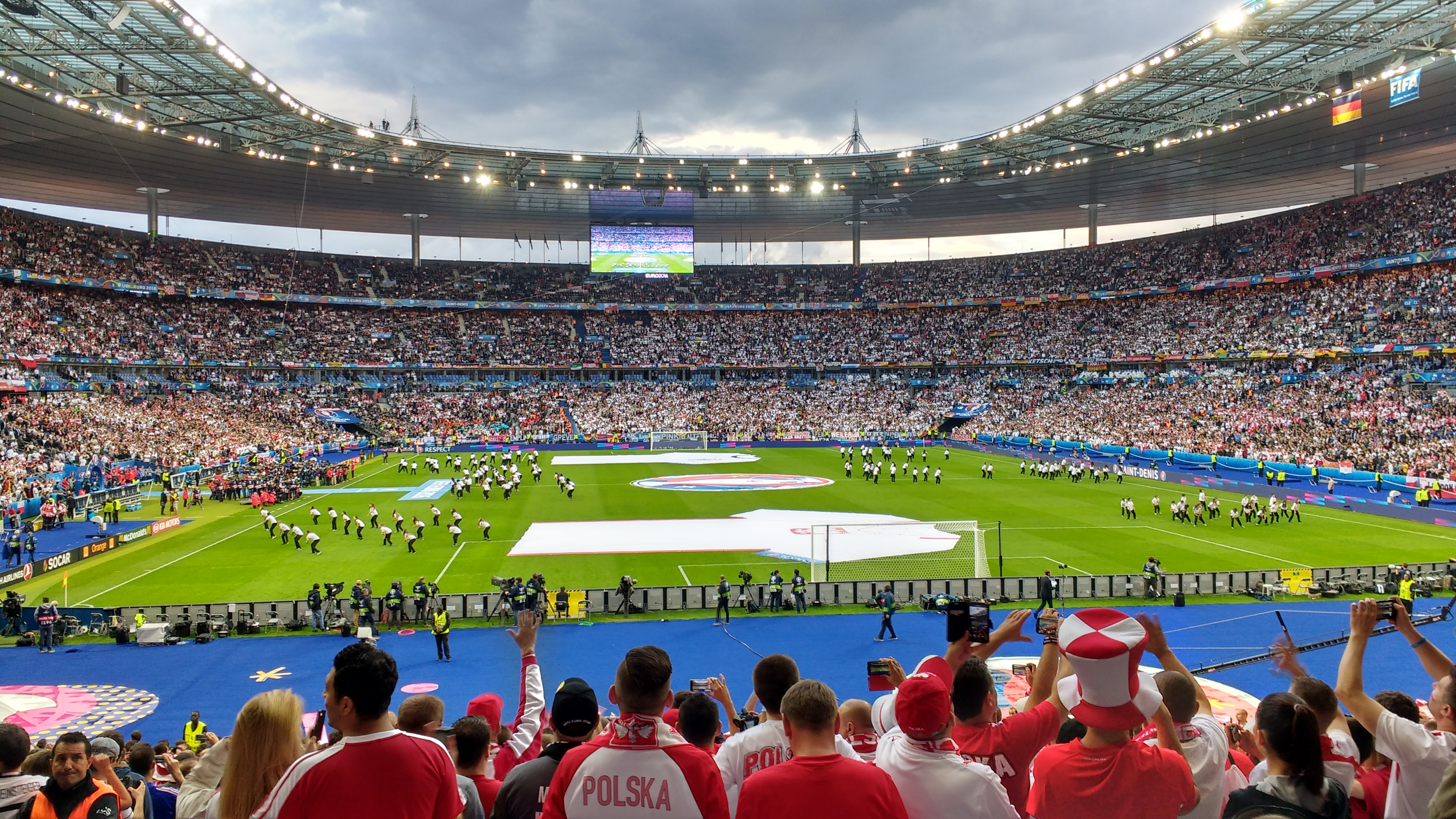
- Event: 2007–08 Coupe de France
Lyon	Paris Saint-Germain
Ligue 1	Ligue 1
1	0
- After extra time
- Date: 24 May 2008
- Venue: Stade de France, Saint-Denis
- Man of the Match: Sidney Govou
- Referee: Philippe Kalt
- Attendance: 79,204

The 2008 Coupe de France final was a football match that was held at the Stade de France in Saint-Denis, France on 24 May 2008. It was the 90th final in the Coupe de France's history. The final was contested between Paris Saint-Germain and Olympique Lyonnais. This was PSG's 10th appearance in the Coupe de France final, having won the cup in 1982, 1983, 1993, 1995, 1998, 2004, and 2006. They also lost in the final twice in 1985 and 2003. With a win in this year's final, PSG would have been granted the rare cup double with their last double coming in 1998. This was Olympique Lyonnais's 7th appearance in the final having won in 1964, 1967, and 1973. They lost in the final three times in 1963, 1971, and 1976.

== Road to the final ==
Paris Saint-Germain			Round	Lyon
Opponent	H/A	Result	2007–08 Coupe de France	Opponent	H/A	Result
Épinal	A	2–0	Round of 64	Créteil	A	4–0
Le Poiré-sur-Vie	A	3–1	Round of 32	Croix de Savoie	A	1–0
Bastia	H	2–1	Round of 16	Sochaux	H	2–1
Carquefou	A	1–0	Quarter-finals	Metz	H	1–0
Amiens	A	1–0	Semi-finals	Sedan	H	1–0

== Match information ==
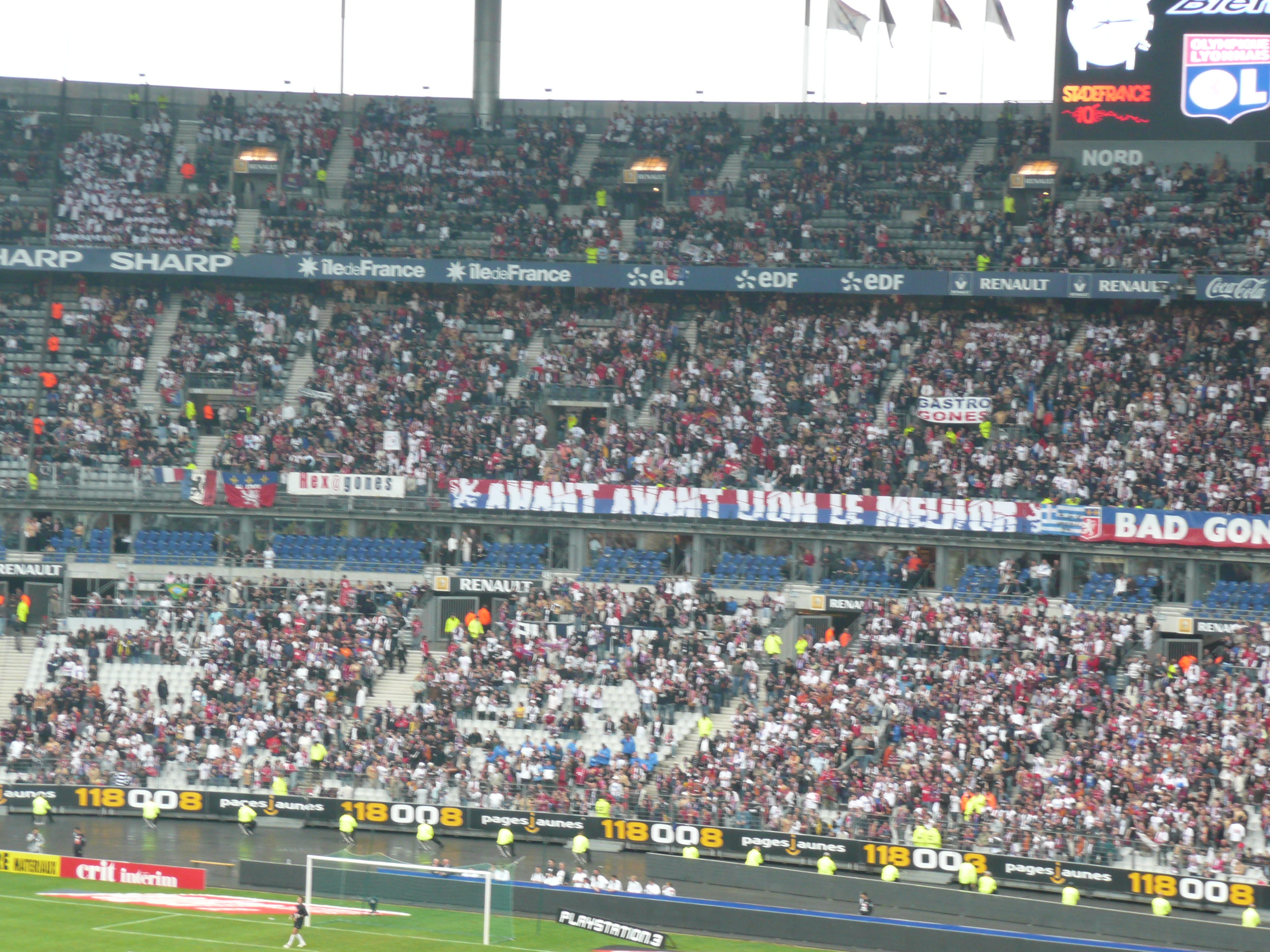
Lyon supporters at the 2008 Coupe de France Final.

In front of a sell-out crowd of 80,000+ fans, Olympique Lyonnais and Paris Saint-Germain stepped on the pitch of the Stade de France to contest the 90th Coupe de France. PSG tore Lyon's defense ragged for most of the game and had a goal by Sylvain Armand incorrectly ruled offside. Olympique Lyonnais held on to 0–0 after 90 minutes, winning the match in extra time.

The majority of the first half was mainly dominated by PSG who thrived on Lyon's turnovers using them in order to counterattack. Lyon players, becoming frustrated, committed several malicious challenges leading to the likes of Anthony Réveillère and Sébastien Squillaci picking up yellow cards. The second half was partially even with both teams attempting to counterattack each other with both displaying fatigue as the second half moved forward. Both PSG and Lyon had several chances. Lyon's primary chances were as a result of Juninho's free kicks, while PSG probably had the best chance of the night when Amara Diané got through in the box and had a great chance, however it was miraculously saved by Grégory Coupet, who was playing his last match in a Lyon jersey, leaving the match up for grabs as they headed to extra time. One notable moment of the second half was the substitution of Pauleta, who was playing his final match for PSG. He was given a standing ovation by PSG supporters.

The first half of extra time was progressively slow with both clubs trying to get a strategic view of each other. It wasn't until the end of the first half of extra time when a goal was finally conceded. Following a cross by Karim Benzema, Sidney Govou pounced on the loose ball in the box after it went off Kader Keïta to give Lyon the lead after 102 minutes of play. Following the goal, Lyon finally settled down and opted to a more defensive style of play utilizing the offside trap and holding on to the ball more turning the tables on PSG, who were now becoming frustrated, with Mario Yepes delivering a questionable elbow on Benzema. Sidney Govou's goal would eventually be the only goal of the match giving Lyon their first Coupe de France title victory in 35 years. With the win in the final, Lyon were also granted their first ever double having won Ligue 1 this past season.

Since both clubs have automatically qualified for European competitions, PSG via the Coupe de la Ligue, Lyon via Ligue 1, the Coupe de France European place was reverted to the league. The spot was awarded to AS Saint-Étienne, ironically Lyon's primary rivals.

== Match details ==
24 May 2008
21:00

Lyon	1–0 (a.e.t.)	Paris Saint-Germain
Govou 102'	Source

Stade de France, Saint-Denis
Attendance: 79,204
Referee: Philippe Kalt

Lyon	PSG

Lyon:
GK	1	(France) Grégory Coupet
RB	2	(France) Anthony Réveillère	(yellow card) 41'
CB	4	(France) Jean-Alain Boumsong
CB	5	(France) Sébastien Squillaci	(yellow card) 45'
LB	11	(Italy) Fabio Grosso
RM	7	(France) Sidney Govou
CM	3	(France) Jérémy Toulalan
CM	8	(Brazil) Juninho (c)		(substituted off) 117'
LM	6	(Sweden) Kim Källström		(substituted off) 68'
FW	10	(France) Karim Benzema
FW	9	(Brazil) Fred		(substituted off) 73'
Substitutes:
GK	18	(France) Rémy Vercoutre
DF	13	(France) François Clerc		(substituted on) 117'
MF	12	(France) Mathieu Bodmer		(substituted on) 68'
MF	17	(Spain) Marc Crosas
MF	14	(Argentina) César Delgado
FW	15	(France) Hatem Ben Arfa
FW	16	(Ivory Coast) Kader Keïta	(yellow card) 110'	(substituted on) 73'
Manager:
(France) Alain Perrin

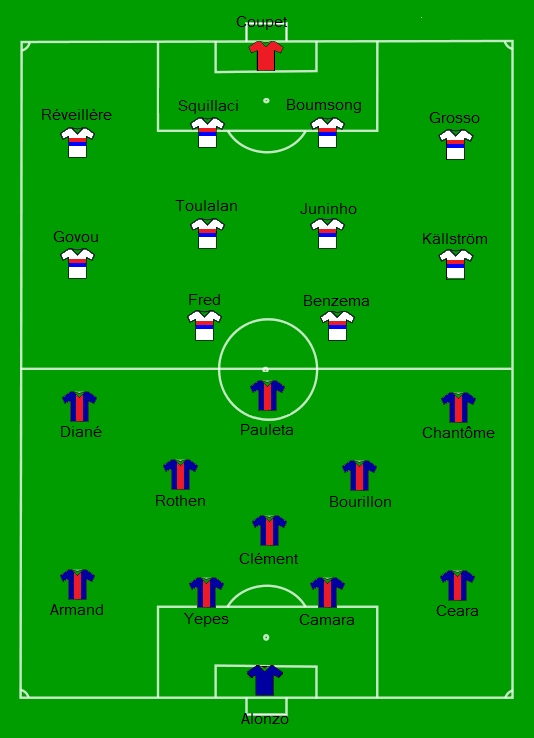

PSG:
GK	1	(France) Jérôme Alonzo
RB	2	(Brazil) Ceará
CB	6	(Colombia) Mario Yepes
CB	4	(France) Zoumana Camara	(yellow card) 40'
LB	3	(France) Sylvain Armand
RM	10	(France) Clément Chantôme		(substituted off) 83'
CM	5	(France) Grégory Bourillon		(substituted off) 105'
CM	8	(France) Jérémy Clément
CM	7	(France) Jérôme Rothen	(yellow card) 65'
LM	11	(Ivory Coast) Amara Diané
FW	9	(Portugal) Pauleta (c)		(substituted off) 80'
Substitutes:
GK	18	(Armenia) Apoula Edima Bete Edel
DF	15	(France) Bernard Mendy	(yellow card) 113'	(substituted on) 83'
DF	17	(France) Mamadou Sakho
MF	13	(Brazil) Souza		(substituted on) 105'
FW	12	(France) Péguy Luyindula		(substituted on) 80'
FW	14	(France) Yannick Boli
FW	16	(France) Loris Arnaud
Manager:
(France) Paul Le Guen

MATCH OFFICIALS

- Assistant referees:
- Fourth official:

MAN OF THE MATCH

MATCH RULES

- 90 minutes.
- 30 minutes extra-time (15-minute intervals)
- Penalty shoot-out if scores level after extra time.
- Seven named substitutes
- Maximum of 3 substitutions.
