= 1963–64 Coupe de France =

Tournament details
- Country: France

The 'Coupe de Frances results of the '1963–64 season'. Olympique Lyonnais won the final played on May 10, 1964, beating Girondins de Bordeaux.

== Round of 64 ==
| Team 1 | Score | Team 2 |
12 January 1964
| Angers SCO (D1) | 2–0 | AAJ Blois (CFA) |
| US Valenciennes-Anzin (D1) | 1–0 | US Quevilly (CFA) |
| ASPV Strasbourg (DH) | 5–2 | AS de Talange (PH) |
| Sochaux-Montbéliard (D2) | 3–2 (a.e.t.) | Grenoble (D2) |
| UA Sedan-Torcy (D1) | 3–1 (a.e.t.) | US Boulogne (D2) |
| Red Star Paris (D2) | 4–2 | Stade Rennais U.C. (D1) |
| Olympique Lyonnais (D1) | 2–1 | Nîmes Olympique (D1) |
| Lille (D2) | 1–1 (a.e.t.) | AS Aulnoye (CFA) |
| Aix-en-Provence (D2) | 3–1 (a.e.t.) | Olympique Marseille (D2) |
| AS Monaco (D1) | 2–1 (a.e.t.) | SA Thiers (CFA) |
| FC Metz (D2) | 3–0 | Chaumont FC (CFA) |
| Toulon (D2) | 1–1 (a.e.t.) | Cannes (D2) |
| RC Strasbourg (D1) | 2–0 | Besançon (D2) |
| AS Saint-Étienne (D1) | 2–0 | Stade Saint-Germain (CFA) |
| FC Rouen (D1) | 2–0 | CA Vitry (DH) |
| Stade de Reims (D1) | 4–2 | Stade Français FC (D1) |
| RC Paris (D1) | 2–1 | Racing Calais (CFA) |
| OGC Nice (D1) | 4–2 | Gazélec Ajaccio (CFA) |
| FC Nantes (D1) | 7–0 | Stade Camblanais (DH) |
| Nancy (D2) | 2–1 | AC Cambrai (DH) |
| FC Mulhouse (CFA) | 3–1 | US Blanzy-Montceau (DH) |
| CA Montreuillois (CFA) | 5–1 | AS Libourne (DH) |
| RC Lens (D1) | 1–1 (a.e.t.) | CO Roubaix-Tourcoing (PH) |
| US Forbach (D2) | 2–0 | Arago Sports Orléans (CFA) |
| SO Cholet (DH) | 5–0 | Jeunesse Villenave (DH) |
| Cherbourg (D2) | 1–1 (a.e.t.) | Le Havre (D2) |
| LB Châteauroux (CFA) | 6–1 | Stade Morlaix (PH) |
| Nemours (CFA) | 2–1 | Stade Béthune (PH) |
| Girondins de Bordeaux (D1) | 2–1 | Toulouse FC (D1) |
| Béziers (D2) | 2–1 | Annecy FC (CFA) |
| US Albi (CFA) | 2–1 | FC Martigues (PH) |
| Racing Club Agathois (PH) | 0–0 (a.e.t.) | ES Bagnols-Marcoule (DH) |
Replay: 16 January 1964
| Lille (D2) | 1–0 | AS Aulnoye (CFA) |
| Cherbourg (D2) | 2–1 | Le Havre (D2) |
Replay: 19 January 1964
| RC Lens (D1) | 1–0 | CO Roubaix-Tourcoing (PH) |
| Racing Club Agathois (PH) | 2–2 (a.e.t.) | ES Bagnols-Marcoule (DH) |
Replay: 23 January 1964
| Toulon (D2) | 4–1 | Cannes (D2) |
2nd replay: 26 January 1964
| Racing Club Agathois (PH) | 3–0 | ES Bagnols-Marcoule (DH) |

== Round of 32 ==
| Team 1 | Score | Team 2 |
9 February 1964
| Stade de Reims (D1) | 3–3 (a.e.t.) | Lille (D2) |
| US Valenciennes-Anzin (D1) | 2–1 | AS Saint-Étienne (D1) |
| Toulon (D2) | 2–1 | SO Cholet (DH) |
| RC Strasbourg (D1) | 3–0 | Nemours (CFA) |
| ASPV Strasbourg (DH) | 1–1 (a.e.t.) | Racing Club Agathois (PH) |
| Sochaux-Montbéliard (D2) | 2–1 | AS Monaco (D1) |
| Red Star Paris (D2) | 1–1 (a.e.t.) | LB Châteauroux (CFA) |
| FC Rouen (D1) | 0–0 (a.e.t.) | Béziers (D2) |
| RC Paris (D1) | 1–0 | Aix-en-Provence (D2) |
| OGC Nice (D1) | 2–1 | CA Montreuillois (CFA) |
| FC Nantes (D1) | 1–0 | UA Sedan-Torcy (D1) |
| Nancy (D2) | 2–1 | FC Mulhouse (CFA) |
| Olympique Lyonnais (D1) | 2–0 | US Forbach (D2) |
| RC Lens (D1) | 1–1 (a.e.t.) | Angers SCO (D1) |
| Girondins de Bordeaux (D1) | 4–0 | FC Metz (D2) |
| Cherbourg (D2) | 0–0 (a.e.t.) | US Albi (CFA) |
Replay: 13 February 1964
| Stade de Reims (D1) | 2–1 | Lille (D2) |
| FC Rouen (D1) | 1–0 | Béziers (D2) |
| RC Lens (D1) | 2–1 | Angers SCO (D1) |
Replay: 16 February 1964
| ASPV Strasbourg (DH) | 1–1 (a.e.t.) | Racing Club Agathois (PH) |
| Red Star Paris (D2) | 3–1 | LB Châteauroux (CFA) |
| Cherbourg (D2) | 1–0 | US Albi (CFA) |
2nd replay: 23 February 1964
| ASPV Strasbourg (DH) | 1–1 (a.e.t.) | Racing Club Agathois (PH) |
3rd replay: 29 February 1964
| ASPV Strasbourg (DH) | 2–1 | Racing Club Agathois (PH) |

== Round of 16 ==
| Team 1 | Score | Team 2 |
1 March 1964
| Girondins de Bordeaux (D1) | 1–0 | Toulon (D2) |
| RC Lens (D1) | 4–2 (a.e.t.) | Sochaux-Montbéliard (D2) |
| Olympique Lyonnais (D1) | 3–0 | Cherbourg (D2) |
| FC Nantes (D1) | 1–0 | RC Strasbourg (D1) |
| OGC Nice (D1) | 1–0 | Stade de Reims (D1) |
| US Valenciennes-Anzin (D1) | 2–0 | Nancy (D2) |
| FC Rouen (D1) | 2–1 | RC Paris (D1) |
7 March 1964
| Red Star Paris (D2) | 1–0 | ASPV Strasbourg (DH) |

== Quarter-finals ==
| Team 1 | Score | Team 2 |
22 March 1964
| Girondins de Bordeaux (D1) | 2–0 | Red Star Paris (D2) |
| Olympique Lyonnais (D1) | 2–1 | RC Lens (D1) |
| FC Nantes (D1) | 4–1 | OGC Nice (D1) |
| US Valenciennes-Anzin (D1) | 1–0 | FC Rouen (D1) |

== Semi-finals ==
17 April 1964

| Olympique Lyonnais (1) | 2–0 | US Valenciennes-Anzin (1) |
|---|---|---|
| Combin 53'; Di Nallo 90' |

Paris

19 April 1964

| Girondins de Bordeaux (1) | 2–0 | FC Nantes (1) |
|---|---|---|
| De Michele 6' (o.g.); Couécou 53' |

Stade Vélodrome, Marseille

== Final ==
10 May 1964

| Lyon | 2–0 | Bordeaux |
|---|---|---|
| Combin 11', 26' |

Stade Olympique Yves-du-Manoir, Colombes
Attendance: 32,777
Referee: Henri Faucheux
