= Jean-Luc Ettori =

French footballer (born 1955)

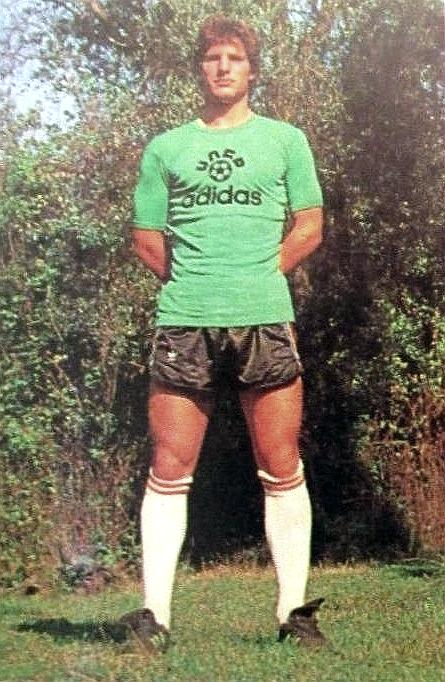
- Ettori in 1977

Personal information
- Full name: Jean-Luc Ettori
- Date of birth: 29 July 1955 (age 71)
- Place of birth: Marseille, France
- Height: 1.75 m (5 ft 9 in)
- Position: Goalkeeper

Senior career*
Years	Team	Apps	(Gls)
1975–1994	Monaco	602	(0)

International career
1980–1982	France	9	(0)

Managerial career
- 1995: Monaco
- * Club domestic league appearances and goals

Jean-Luc Ettori (born 29 July 1955) is a French former professional footballer who played as goalkeeper. He spent his entire career with AS Monaco, and had held the record for the most appearances by any player in Ligue 1 or Division 1 with 602 appearances until 4 December 2013 when Mickaël Landreau surpassed his record. He earned nine caps for France in the early 1980s, including starting six out of seven matches in the 1982 World Cup.

== Honours ==
Monaco

- Division 1: 1977–78 1981–82, 1987–88
- Coupe de France: 1980, 1985, 1991
- Trophée des Champions: 1985

Orders

- Knight of the National Order of Merit: 1994
