= 1966–67 Coupe de France =

French football competition

Tournament details
- Country: France

The 1966–67 Coupe de France was its 50th edition. It was won by Olympique Lyonnais which defeated FC Sochaux-Montbéliard in the Final.

== Round of 16 ==
Team 1	Score	Team 2
Angers SCO (D1)	1–0	Lille OSC (D1)
AS Angoulême (D2)	1–1 (a.e.t.)	FC Nantes (D1)
SEC Bastia (D2)	3–1	RC Strasbourg (D1)
RC Lens (D1)	2–1 (a.e.t.)	RC Paris-Sedan (D1)
Olympique Lyonnais (D1)	1–0	FC Rouen (D1)
AS Monaco (D1)	1–0	AS Aix (D2)
Stade Rennais (D1)	2–0	Stade de Paris (D1)
FC Sochaux-Montbéliard (D1)	1–1 (a.e.t.)	ECAC Chaumont (D2)
Replay
AS Angoulême (D2)	1–0	FC Nantes (D1)
FC Sochaux-Montbéliard (D1)	2–1	ECAC Chaumont (D2)

== Quarter-finals ==
Team 1	Score	Team 2
AS Angoulême (D2)	2–0	RC Lens (D1)
Stade Rennais (D1)	2–1	AS Monaco (D1)
Olympique Lyonnais (D1)	1–0	Angers SCO (D1)
FC Sochaux-Montbéliard (D1)	1–1 (a.e.t.)	SEC Bastia (D2)
Replay
FC Sochaux-Montbéliard (D1)	0–0 (a.e.t.)	SEC Bastia (D2)
2nd replay
FC Sochaux-Montbéliard (D1)	1–0	SEC Bastia (D2)

== Semi-finals ==
First round

21 April 1967

FC Sochaux-Montbéliard (1)	0–0 (a.e.t.)	Stade Rennais (1)
	(Report)

23 April 1967

Olympique Lyonnais (1)	3–3 (a.e.t.)	AS Angoulême (2)
Di Nallo 12', 41'; Palka 36'	(Report)	Goujon 34', 51'; Phelipon 77'

Second round

29 April 1967

FC Sochaux-Montbéliard (1)	4–3	Stade Rennais (1)
Schmit 26', 45', 57'; Lassalette 37'	(Report)	Takač 15', 83'; Prigent 84'

3 May 1967

Olympique Lyonnais (1)	1–1 (a.e.t.)	AS Angoulême (2)
Rambert 3'	(Report)	Edom 8'

Third round

10 May 1967

Olympique Lyonnais (1)	1–1 (a.e.t.)	AS Angoulême (2)
Di Nallo 55'	(Report)	Goujon 34'

Olympique Lyonnais qualified after winning a toss.

== Final ==
21 May 1967

Lyon	3–1	Sochaux
Rambert 22'; Perrin 81'; Di Nallo 89'		Leclerc 33'

Parc des Princes, Paris
Attendance: 32,523
Referee: Robert Lacoste
