= Roger Machin =

French association football referee (1926–2021)

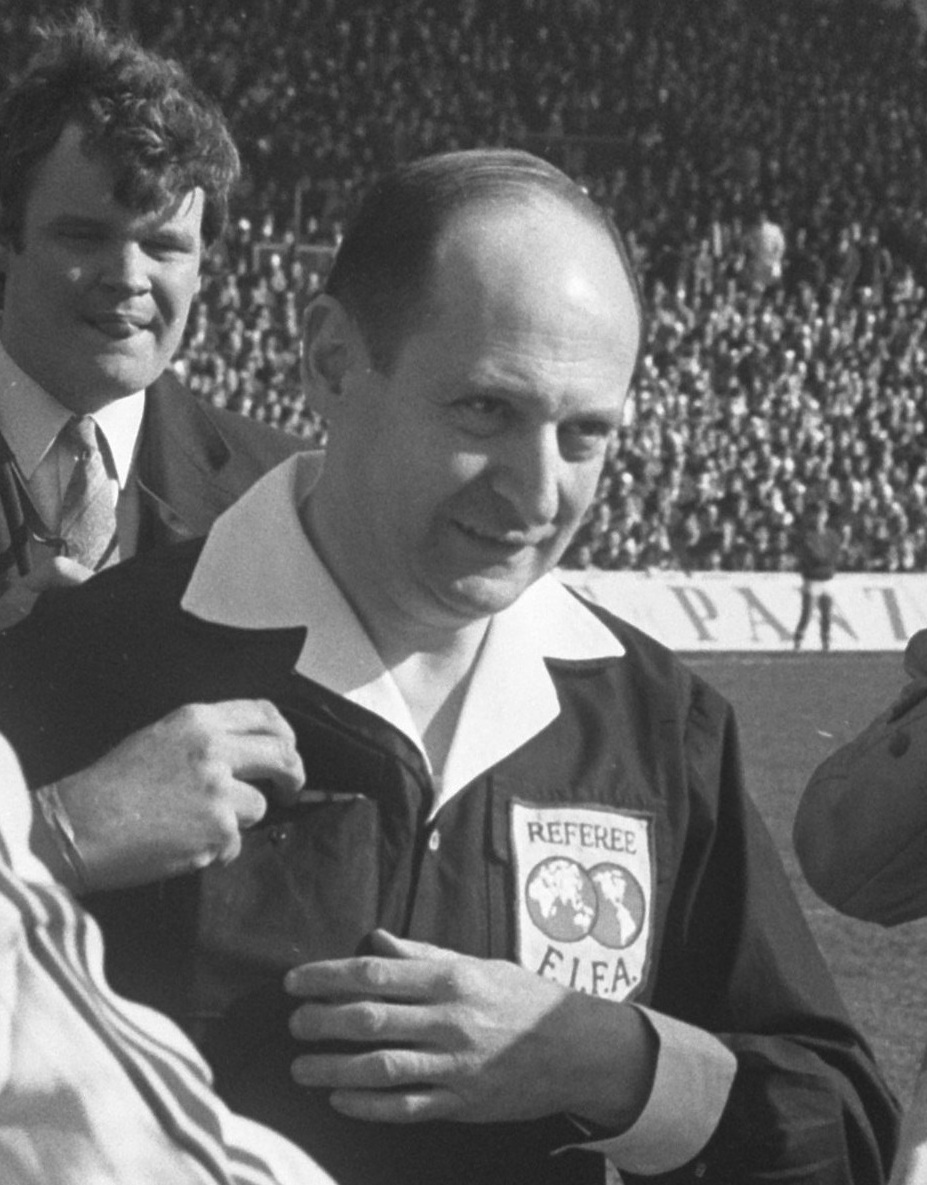
Roger Machin, 1969

Roger Machin (26 April 1926 – 17 January 2021) was a French international football referee.

== Life and career ==
Machin was born in April 1926 in Toulon, France.

He was member of FIFA in 1964–73 and refereed six international matches. Roger officiated a group stage match in 1970 World Cup, two matches in 1970 World Cup qualifying and two matches in EURO 1972 qualifying.

In club football he officiated some UEFA competition matches such as Champions League (8), UEFA Cup (8) and Cup Winners Cup (5). Roger Machin attributed 1969 Intercontinental Cup Final 1st leg, that was played between Milan-Estudiantes (3:0). He refereed 252 Ligue 1 matches in 1961–75. He also officiated 1969 Coupe de France Final.

Machin died in January 2021 at the age of 94.

== Successes ==
He was awarded the International Referee Special Award and Diploma by France Football Federation.
