= Louis Hon =

French footballer (1924–2008)

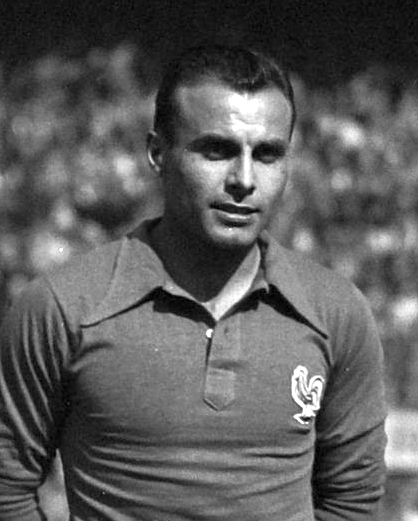
- Hon in 1949

Personal information
- Full name: Antonin Louis Hon
- Date of birth: 11 September 1924
- Place of birth: Couches, Saône-et-Loire, France
- Date of death: 5 January 2008 (aged 83)
- Place of death: Saint-Raphaël, France
- Position: Defender

Youth career
- Sentinelle de Brienon
- Montélimar
- V.G.A. Saint-Maur

Senior career*
Years	Team	Apps	(Gls)
1946–1950	Stade Français		
1950–1953	Real Madrid	41	(0)
1953–1956	Stade Français		
1956	Stade Saint-Raphaël		

International career
1947–1949	France	12	(0)

Managerial career
- 1957–1958: Jaén
- 1959–1960: Racing Santander
- 1960: Celta
- 1960–1961: Real Madrid B
- 1963–1964: Racing Santander
- 1964–1965: Betis
- 1965–1966: Zaragoza
- 1966–1968: Lyon
- 1968–1969: Angers
- 1969–1970: Pontevedra
- 1970–1971: Ajaccio
- 1971–1972: Olympique Avignonnais
- 1972–1973: Paris FC
- 1973–1974: Ajaccio
- 1976–1978: Lorient
- * Club domestic league appearances and goals

Louis Hon (11 September 1924 – 5 January 2008) was a French professional footballer and coach. He was the first French-born player to sign with Real Madrid. After his playing career, Hon was a manager in Spain and France, guiding Lyon to a win in the 1966–67 Coupe de France.
