= Alexandre Vincent =

French footballer (born 1994)

Personal information
- Date of birth: 25 April 1994 (age 32)
- Place of birth: Grenoble, France
- Height: 1.73 m (5 ft 8 in)
- Position: Winger

Team information
- Current team: Les Herbiers
- Number: 19

Youth career
- –2015: Auxerre

Senior career*
Years	Team	Apps	(Gls)
2012–2018	Auxerre B	68	(8)
2015–2018	Auxerre	55	(7)
2018–2019	Laval	28	(2)
2018–2019	Laval B	2	(0)
2020	Rouen	3	(0)
2020–2021	Concarneau	28	(3)
2021–2022	Chambly	24	(3)
2022–2024	Le Mans	46	(2)
2024–	Les Herbiers	28	(3)
- * Club domestic league appearances and goals as of 4 December 2025

Alexandre Vincent (born 25 April 1994) is a French professional footballer who plays as a winger for Championnat National 1 club Les Herbiers.

== Career ==
Vincent is a youth exponent from Auxerre. He made his Ligue 2 debut on 23 January 2015 against Orléans in a 0–0 away draw. He scored his first goal on 25 April 2015 against Châteauroux in a 2–1 away defeat. On 30 May 2015, he appeared in the 2015 Coupe de France Final as a second-half substitute.

In July 2018, Vincent signed a one-year contract with Laval. He left at the end of the contract, and eventually signed for Rouen in January 2020.

In July 2020, Vincent had a successful trial with Concarneau, and joined the club for the 2020–21 season. After having played for Chambly, Vincent joined Le Mans in 2022.
