= Gilbert Moevi =

French footballer (1934–2022)

Personal information
- Date of birth: 1 September 1934
- Place of birth: Lomé, French Togoland
- Date of death: 26 February 2022 (aged 87)
- Height: 1.84 m (6 ft 0 in)
- Position: Defender

Senior career*
Years	Team	Apps	(Gls)
1959–1967	Bordeaux	251	(4)
Total		251	(4)
- * Club domestic league appearances and goals

Gilbert Moevi (1 September 1934 – 26 February 2022) was a French footballer. A defender, he spent his senior career with Girondins de Bordeaux from 1959 to 1967. He died on 26 February 2022, at the age of 87.
