= 1969 Coupe de France final =

- Event: 1968–69 Coupe de France
| Marseille | Bordeaux |
| 2 | 0 |
- Date: 18 May 1969
- Venue: Olympique Yves-du-Manoir, Colombes
- Referee: Roger Machin
- Attendance: 39,460

The 1969 Coupe de France final was a football match held at Stade Olympique Yves-du-Manoir, Colombes on May 18, 1969, that saw Olympique de Marseille defeat FC Girondins de Bordeaux 2–0 thanks to an own goal by Gérard Papin and a goal by Joseph Yegba Maya.

== Match details ==
18 May 1969

| Marseille | 2–0 | Bordeaux |
|---|---|---|
| Papin 82' (o.g.); Yegba Maya 89' |

Stade Olympique Yves-du-Manoir, Colombes
Attendance: 39,460
Referee: Roger Machin

| GK | (France) Jean-Paul Escale |
| DF | (France) Jean-Pierre Lopez |
| DF | (France) Jean-Louis Hodoul |
| DF | (France) Jules Zvunka |
| DF | (France) Jean Djorkaeff | (c) |
| MF | (France) Jacques Novi |
| MF | (France) Jean-Pierre Destrumelle |
| MF | (Sweden) Roger Magnusson |
| FW | (Cameroon) Joseph Yegba Maya |
| FW | (France) Joseph Bonnel |
| FW | (France) Hubert Guéniche |
Substitutes:
Manager:
(France) Mario Zatelli Assistant Referees: Fourth Official:

GK
DF
DF
DF
DF
MF
MF
MF
FW
FW
FW
Substitutes:
FW
Manager:
(France) Jean-Pierre Bakrim

(France) Christian Montes
(France) Gérard Papin
(France) André Chorda
(France) Bernard Baudet
(France) Robert Péri
(France) Guy Calleja | (c)
(France) Claude Petyt
(France) Jacques Simon
(Brazil) Ruyter De Oliveira
(France) Félix Burdino | (substituted off) 65'
(France) Edouard Wojciak
(France) Didier Couécou | (substituted in) 65'

== See also ==
- 1968–69 Coupe de France
