= 2016 Coupe de France final =

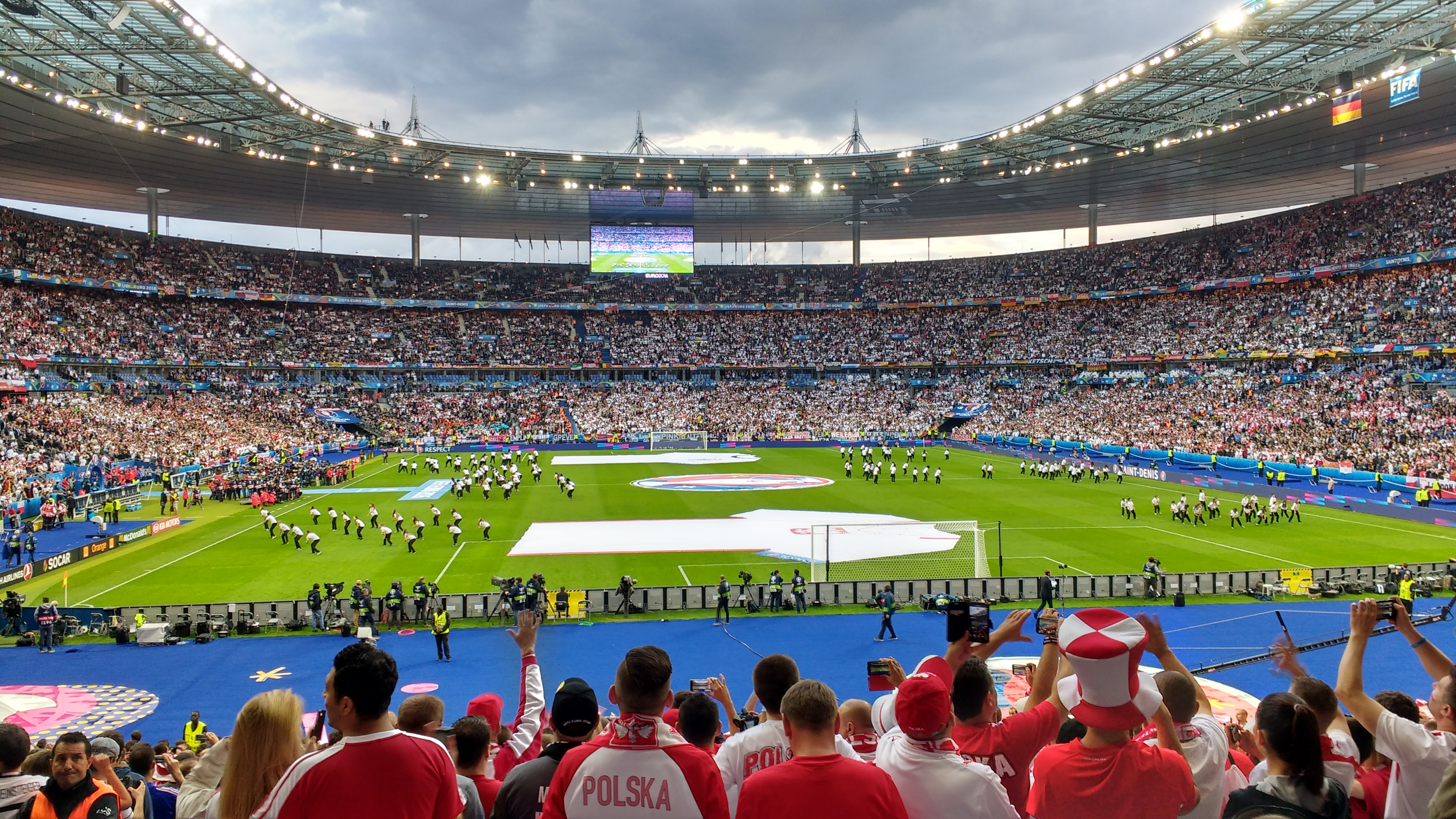
- Stade de France
- Event: 2015–16 Coupe de France
Olympique de Marseille	Paris Saint-Germain
Ligue 1	Ligue 1
2	4
- Date: 21 May 2016
- Venue: Stade de France, Saint-Denis
- Man of the Match: Zlatan Ibrahimović
- Referee: Clement Turpin
- Attendance: 80,000

The 2016 Coupe de France final decided the winner of the 2015–16 Coupe de France, the 99th season of France's all-main-divisions football cup. It took place on 21 May at the Stade de France in Saint-Denis, Paris.

In the final, Olympique de Marseille took on arch-rivals Paris Saint-Germain, in a rematch of the 2006 final, which PSG won 2–1. PSG were the defending champions, having beaten Auxerre in the 2015 Coupe de France final. As PSG had won the 2015–16 Ligue 1 title already, the otherwise-enabled Europa League place went to the next highest league finisher (in this case, Saint-Étienne).

PSG equalled Marseille's record ten Coupe de France victories with their win.

== Background ==
The match was OM's 19th final (a record), of which they had won 10. Their most recent final was in 2007, which they lost on penalties to Sochaux. PSG had won 9 Coupe de France titles from 13 finals prior to this year's showpiece.

This was Zlatan Ibrahimović's last game for Paris Saint-Germain before moving to Manchester United.

== Route to the final ==
Marseille			Round	Paris Saint-Germain
Opponent	H/A	Result	2015–16 Coupe de France	Opponent	H/A	Result
Caen	A	0–0 (a.e.t.) (3–1 pen.)	Round of 64	ES Wasquehal	A	1–0
Montpellier	H	2–0	Round of 32	Toulouse	H	2–1
Trelissac	A	2–0	Round of 16	Lyon	H	3–0
Granville	A	1–0	Quarter-finals	Saint-Étienne	A	3–1
Sochaux	A	1–0	Semi-finals	Lorient	A	1–0

== Match ==
=== Details ===
21 May 2016
21:00 CEST

Marseille	2–4	Paris Saint-Germain
Thauvin 12'; Batshuayi 87'	Report	Matuidi 2'; Ibrahimović 47' (pen.), 82'; Cavani 57'

Stade de France, Saint-Denis
Attendance: 80,000
Referee: Clement Turpin

Marseille	Paris Saint-Germain

GK	30	(France) Steve Mandanda (c)
RB	2	(Spain) Javier Manquillo
CB	3	(Cameroon) Nicolas Nkoulou
CB	4	(Netherlands) Karim Rekik
LB	23	(France) Benjamin Mendy	(yellow card) 33'
RM	24	(France) Florian Thauvin		(substituted off) 81'
CM	18	(Chile) Mauricio Isla
CM	10	(France) Lassana Diarra
LM	19	(Morocco) Abdelaziz Barrada		(substituted off) 70'
FW	22	(Belgium) Michy Batshuayi
FW	9	(Scotland) Steven Fletcher		(substituted off) 60'
Substitutes:
GK	16	(France) Yohann Pelé
DF	6	(Portugal) Rolando
DF	26	(Ivory Coast) Brice Dja Djédjé		(substituted in) 70'
MF	20	(Togo) Alaixys Romao
MF	11	(France) Romain Alessandrini
MF	13	(France) Rémy Cabella		(substituted in) 60'
MF	14	(France) Georges-Kévin Nkoudou		(substituted in) 81'
Manager:
(France) Franck Passi

GK	30	(Italy) Salvatore Sirigu
RB	19	(Ivory Coast) Serge Aurier
CB	5	(Brazil) Marquinhos
CB	2	(Brazil) Thiago Silva (c)
LB	17	(Brazil) Maxwell
CM	14	(France) Blaise Matuidi
CM	4	(France) Benjamin Stambouli	(substituted off) 75'
CM	25	(France) Adrien Rabiot
RW	11	(Argentina) Ángel Di María
LW	9	(Uruguay) Edinson Cavani	(substituted off) 75'
CF	10	(Sweden) Zlatan Ibrahimović	(substituted off) 90'
Substitutes:
GK	1	(France) Nicolas Douchez
DF	20	(France) Layvin Kurzawa	(substituted in) 90'
DF	34	(French Guiana) Kévin Rimane
DF	23	(Netherlands) Gregory van der Wiel
DF	32	(Brazil) David Luiz	(substituted in) 75'
MF	7	(Brazil) Lucas Moura	(substituted in) 75'
FW	29	(France) Jean-Kévin Augustin
Manager:
(France) Laurent Blanc

== See also ==
- Le Classique
