= Marcel Dib =

French footballer (born 1960)

Personal information
- Date of birth: 10 August 1960 (age 66)
- Place of birth: Marseille, France
- Height: 1.79 m (5 ft 10 in)
- Position: Midfielder

Youth career
- 1974–1975: U.S. Saint Marcel
- 1975–1978: Martigues
- 1978–1980: 1er Canton Marseille

Senior career*
Years	Team	Apps	(Gls)
1980–1985	Toulon	65	(1)
1985–1993	Monaco	268	(14)
1993–1994	Bordeaux	26	(0)
1994–1996	Marseille	76	(5)
Total		435	(20)

International career
1988–1990	France	6	(0)
- * Club domestic league appearances and goals

Marcel Dib (born 10 August 1960) is a French former professional footballer who played as a midfielder for SC Toulon, AS Monaco, FC Girondins de Bordeaux and Olympique de Marseille.

== Honours ==
Monaco

- Coupe de France: 1990–91
