= 2017 Coupe de France final =

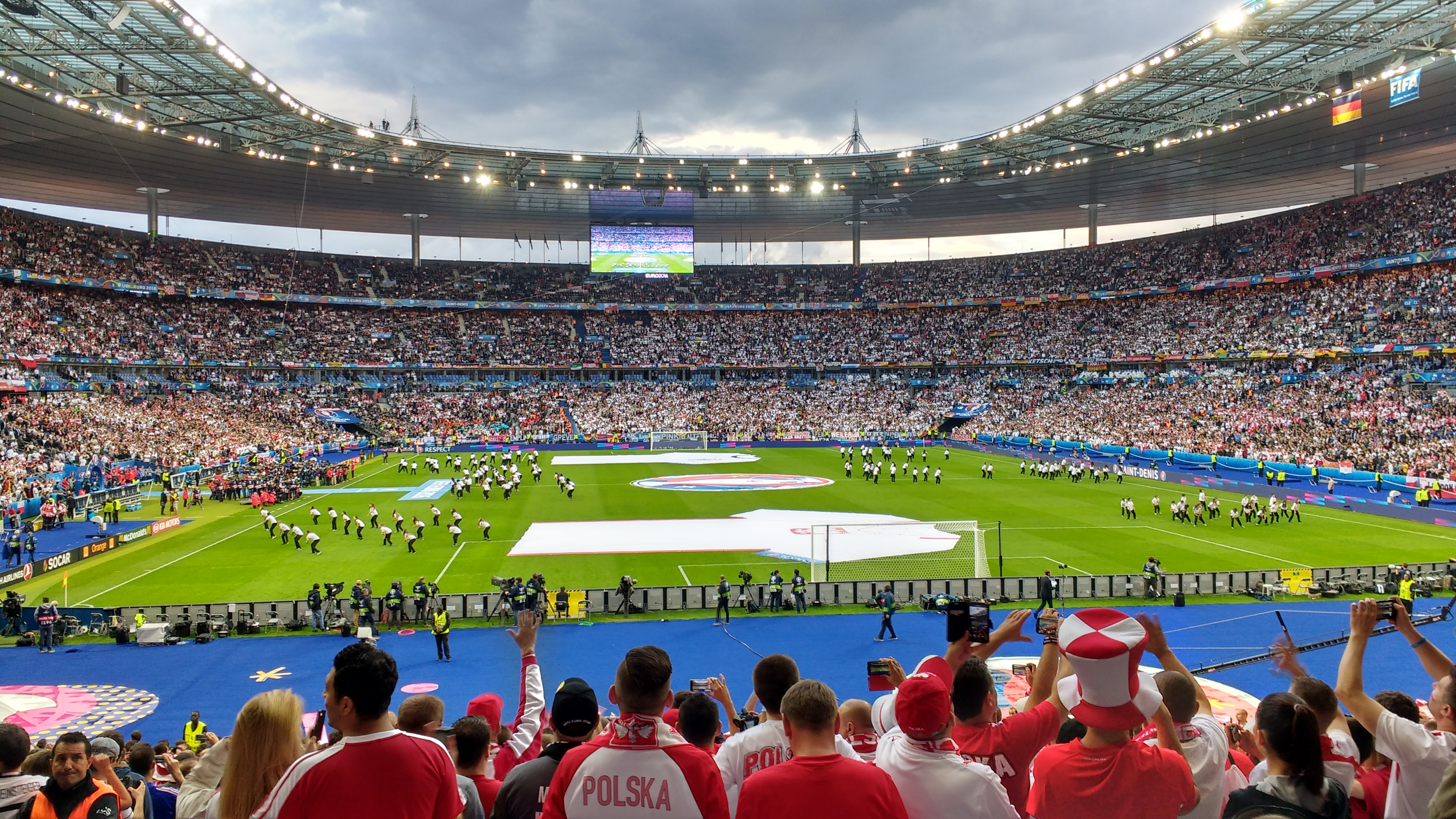
- The Stade de France hosted the final
- Event: 2016–17 Coupe de France
| Angers | Paris Saint-Germain |
| Ligue 1 | Ligue 1 |
| 0 | 1 |
- Date: 27 May 2017
- Venue: Stade de France, Saint-Denis
- Referee: Benoît Bastien
- Attendance: 78,000

The 2017 Coupe de France final was a football match between French clubs Angers and Paris Saint-Germain to determine the winner of the 2016–17 Coupe de France, the 100th season of France's all-main-divisions football cup. It took place on 27 May at the Stade de France in Saint-Denis, Paris.

== Background ==
This match was Angers' 2nd Coupe de France final (their first in 60 years), and they had never won the trophy before. Their last final was in 1957, which they lost 6–3 to Toulouse.

Paris Saint-Germain, meanwhile, had played in 14 finals and won 10 titles (a shared record), and they were the defending champions, having defeated Marseille 4–2 in the 2016 final.

== Route to the final ==
| Angers | | Round | Paris Saint-Germain |
|---|---|---|---|---|
| Opponent | Result | 2016–17 Coupe de France | Opponent | Result |
| Granville | 2–1 (A) | Round of 64 | Bastia | 7–0 (H) |
| Caen | 3–1 (H) | Round of 32 | Rennes | 4–0 (A) |
| CA Bastia | 1–0 (A) | Round of 16 | Niort | 2–0 (A) |
| Bordeaux | 2–1 (H) | Quarter-finals | Avranches | 4–0 (A) |
| Guingamp | 2–0 (H) | Semi-finals | Monaco | 5–0 (H) |

Note: H = home fixture, A = away fixture

== Match ==
=== Summary ===
The only goal came in the first minute of second-half stoppage time; a corner from the right by Ángel Di María was headed in with the back of his head by Issa Cissokho at the near post for an own goal.

=== Details ===
27 May 2017
21:00 CEST

| Angers | 0–1 | Paris Saint-Germain |
|---|---|---|
| | Report | Cissokho 90+1' (o.g.) |

Stade de France, Saint-Denis
Attendance: 78,000
Referee: Benoît Bastien

| Angers | Paris Saint-Germain |

| GK | 30 | (France) Alexandre Letellier |
| RB | 28 | (Senegal) Issa Cissokho |
| CB | 8 | (Ivory Coast) Ismaël Traoré | (yellow card) 68' |
| CB | 24 | (France) Romain Thomas |
| LB | 29 | (France) Vincent Manceau |
| CM | 17 | (Senegal) Cheikh N'Doye |
| CM | 18 | (France) Baptiste Santamaria | | (substituted off) 90+2' |
| CM | 5 | (France) Thomas Mangani |
| RW | 19 | (Ivory Coast) Nicolas Pépé | | (substituted off) 84' |
| CF | 9 | (Senegal) Famara Diedhiou | (yellow card) 57' | (substituted off) 63' |
| LW | 7 | (Cameroon) Karl Toko Ekambi |
Substitutes:
| GK | 1 | (Serbia) Denis Petrić |
| DF | 4 | (Croatia) Mateo Pavlović |
| MF | 15 | (France) Pierrick Capelle |
| MF | 20 | (France) Flavien Tait | | (substituted on) 84' |
| FW | 2 | (France) Kévin Bérigaud | | (substituted on) 90+2' |
| FW | 10 | (France) Gilles Sunu |
| FW | 22 | (France) Jonathan Bamba | | (substituted on) 63' |
Manager:
(France) Stéphane Moulin

| GK | 16 | (France) Alphonse Areola |
| RB | 19 | (Ivory Coast) Serge Aurier | (yellow card) 45+3' |
| CB | 5 | (Brazil) Marquinhos |
| CB | 2 | (Brazil) Thiago Silva (c) |
| LB | 17 | (Brazil) Maxwell |
| CM | 6 | (Italy) Marco Verratti |
| CM | 8 | (Italy) Thiago Motta |
| CM | 14 | (France) Blaise Matuidi |
| RW | 11 | (Argentina) Ángel Di María | (yellow card) 42' |
| CF | 9 | (Uruguay) Edinson Cavani |
| LW | 23 | (Germany) Julian Draxler | | (substituted off) 72' |
Substitutes:
| GK | 1 | (Germany) Kevin Trapp |
| DF | 3 | (France) Presnel Kimpembe |
| MF | 7 | (Brazil) Lucas Moura |
| MF | 10 | (Argentina) Javier Pastore | | (substituted on) 72' |
| MF | 18 | (Argentina) Giovani Lo Celso |
| MF | 25 | (France) Adrien Rabiot |
| FW | 15 | (Portugal) Gonçalo Guedes |
Manager:
(Spain) Unai Emery
