= Erwin Kuffer =

Luxembourgish footballer

Personal information
- Full name: Erwin Kuffer
- Date of birth: 16 September 1943 (age 83)
- Place of birth: Luxembourg
- Height: 1.70 m (5 ft 7 in)
- Position: Defender

Senior career*
Years	Team	Apps	(Gls)
1961–1966	Red Boys Differdange		
1966–1969	Lyon	49	(0)
1969–1970	Standard Liège		
1970–1971	Waterschei Thor		
1971–1973	Charleroi		
1973–1975	Red Boys Differdange		

International career
1965–1970	Luxembourg	28	(0)
- * Club domestic league appearances and goals

Erwin Kuffer (born 16 September 1943) is a former Luxembourgish footballer who played as a defender.

== Club career ==
Kuffer started his career at local team Red Boys Differdange and played in France for Lyon and in Belgium for Standard Liège.

== International career ==
He made his debut for Luxembourg in 1965 and went on to earn over a dozen caps. Kuffer played in 8 FIFA World Cup qualification matches.
