= 1986 Coupe de France final =

- Event: 1985–86 Coupe de France
| Bordeaux | Marseille |
| 2 | 1 |
- After extra time
- Date: 30 April 1986
- Venue: Parc des Princes, Paris
- Referee: Joël Quiniou
- Attendance: 45,429

The 1986 Coupe de France final was a football match held at Parc des Princes, Paris on April 30, 1986, that saw FC Girondins de Bordeaux defeat Olympique de Marseille 2–1 thanks to goals by Jean Tigana and Alain Giresse.

== Match details ==
30 April 1986

| Bordeaux | 2–1 (a.e.t.) | Marseille |
|---|---|---|
| Tigana 52'; Giresse 116' | | Diallo 45' (pen.) |

Parc des Princes, Paris
Attendance: 45,429
Referee: Joël Quiniou

| GK | 1 | (France) Dominique Dropsy |
| DF | 2 | (France) Jean-Christophe Thouvenel |
| DF | 3 | (West Germany) Gernot Rohr |
| DF | 4 | (France) Alain Roche |
| DF | 5 | (France) Patrick Battiston |
| MF | 6 | (France) René Girard |
| MF | 14 | (France) Jean Tigana |
| MF | 8 | (France) Thierry Tusseau |
| MF | 10 | (France) Alain Giresse (c) |
| FW | 9 | (France) Bernard Lacombe | (substituted off) 64' |
| FW | 11 | (West Germany) Uwe Reinders (penalty missed) 25' |
Substitutes:
| MF | 13 | (France) Laurent Lassagne | (substituted in) 64' |
Manager:
(France) Aimé Jacquet Assistant Referees: Fourth Official:

| GK | 1 | (Cameroon) Joseph-Antoine Bell |
| DF | 2 | (France) José Anigo |
| DF | 3 | (France) Christophe Galtier |
| DF | 4 | (France) Jean-Pierre Bade |
| DF | 5 | (France) Jacky Bonnevay (c) |
| MF | 6 | (France) Jean-Louis Zanon | (substituted off) 103' |
| MF | 10 | (France) Jean-Yves Francini |
| MF | 8 | (France) Antoine Martinez |
| MF | 9 | (France) Michel Audrain | (substituted off) 56' |
| MF | 7 | (Senegal) Abdoulaye Diallo |
| FW | 11 | (Denmark) Kenneth Brylle |
Substitutes:
| DF | 13 | (France) Eric Di Meco | (substituted in) 56' |
| DF | 12 | (France) Jérôme Lorant | (substituted in) 53' |
Manager:
(Socialist Federal Republic of Yugoslavia) Žarko Olarević

== See also ==
- Coupe de France 1985-86
