= 1989 Coupe de France final =

- Event: 1988–89 Coupe de France
Marseille	Monaco
4	3
- Date: 10 June 1989
- Venue: Parc des Princes, Paris
- Referee: Joël Quiniou
- Attendance: 44,448

The 1989 Coupe de France final was a football match played at Parc des Princes, Paris, on 10 June 1989 that saw Olympique de Marseille defeat AS Monaco FC 4–3 thanks to three goals by Jean-Pierre Papin and one by Klaus Allofs.

== Match details ==
10 June 1989
20:00

Marseille	4–3	Monaco
Papin 12', 22', 47'; Allofs 65'		Dib 31', 72'; Amoros 88' (pen.)

Parc des Princes, Paris
Attendance: 44,448
Referee: Joël Quiniou

GK	1	(France) Gaëtan Huard
DF	2	(France) Philippe Thys
DF	4	(West Germany) Karlheinz Förster
DF	6	(France) Yvon Le Roux
DF	3	(France) Éric Di Meco
MF	8	(France) Bruno Germain
MF	5	(France) Franck Sauzée
MF	10	(France) Philippe Vercruysse	(substituted off) 69'
MF	7	(France) Frédéric Meyrieu	(substituted off) 46'
FW	9	(France) Jean-Pierre Papin (c)
FW	11	(West Germany) Klaus Allofs
Substitutes:
MF	14	(France) Patrice Eyraud	(substituted on) 46'
MF	15	(France) Pascal Gastien	(substituted on) 69'
Manager:
(France) Gérard Gili

GK	1	(France) Jean-Luc Ettori (c)
DF	2	(France) Manuel Amoros
DF	5	(France) Patrick Valéry
DF	3	(France) Luc Sonor
DF	6	(France) Patrick Battiston
MF	7	(France) Fabrice Poullain	(substituted off) 68'
MF	10	(France) Claude Puel	(substituted off) 46'
MF	8	(France) Marcel Dib
MF	4	(France) Emmanuel Petit
MF	11	(England) Glenn Hoddle
FW	9	(Liberia) George Weah
Substitutes:
FW	13	(Ivory Coast) Youssouf Fofana	(substituted on) 46'
FW	14	(Socialist Federal Republic of Yugoslavia) Tony Kurbos	(substituted on) 68'
Manager:
(France) Arsène Wenger

== See also ==
- 1988–89 Coupe de France
