= 2006 Coupe de France final =

Final of the 2005–06 edition of the Coupe de France

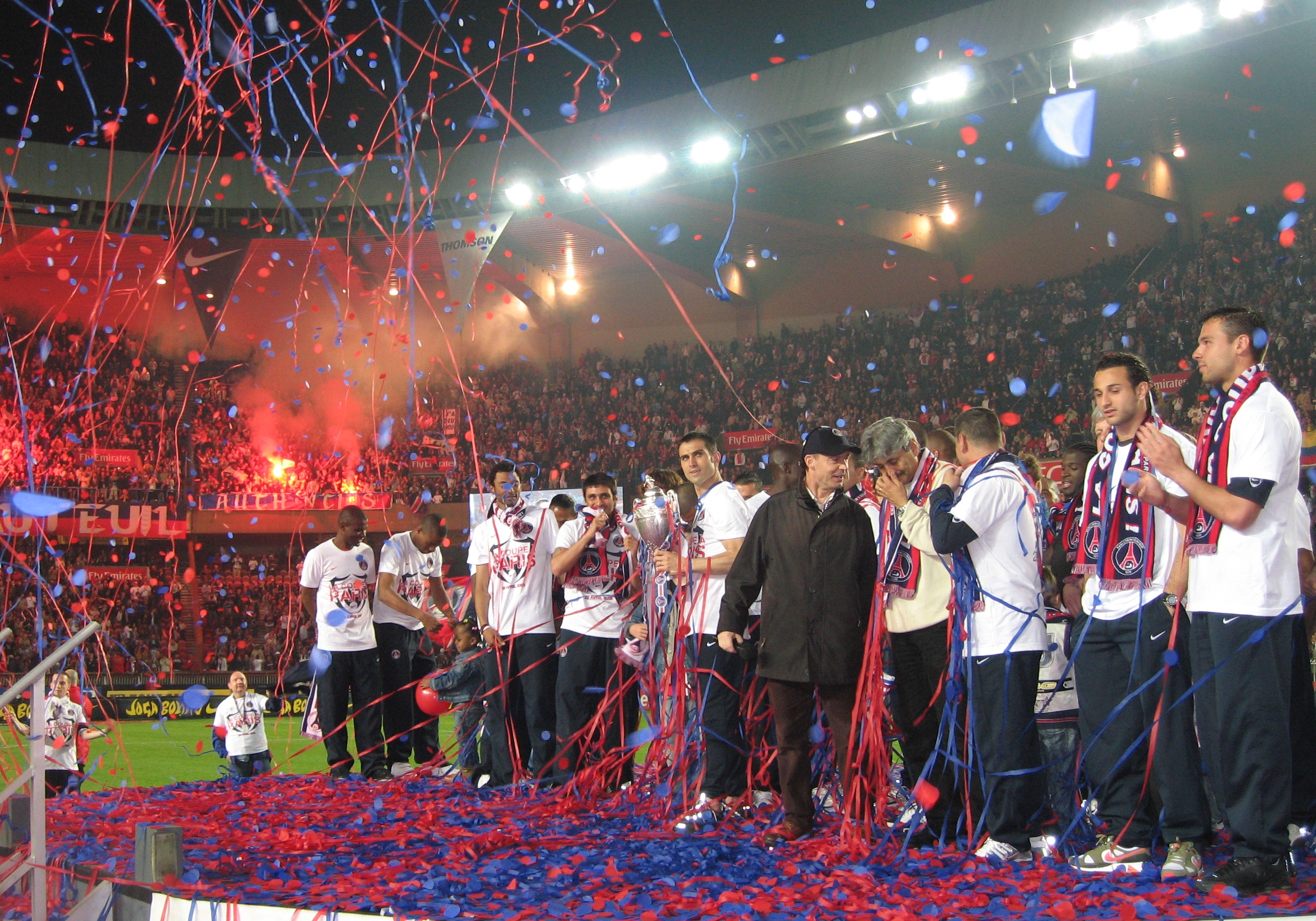
- Paris Saint-Germain players with the Coupe de France trophy
- Event: 2005–06 Coupe de France
Marseille	Paris Saint-Germain
1	2
- Date: 29 April 2006
- Venue: Stade de France, Saint-Denis
- Referee: Laurent Duhamel
- Attendance: 79,061

The 2006 Coupe de France final was a football match held at Stade de France, Saint-Denis, Seine-Saint-Denis, France on 29 April 2006.

The match was played between Olympique de Marseille and Paris Saint-Germain – a rivalry known as Le Classique – in what was the conclusion to the 2005–06 Coupe de France. Paris Saint-Germain won the match 2–1 thanks to goals by Bonaventure Kalou and Vikash Dhorasoo. Toifilou Maoulida scored a consolation goal for Olympique de Marseille.

== Background ==
Olympique de Marseille and Paris Saint-Germain were two of the most successful teams in the history of the Coupe de France having won the competition a total of 16 times between them. As two of the most successful teams in French football, the rivalry between the two is known as Le Classique.

Olympique de Marseille – the most successful team in the competition's history at the time – had won the Coupe de France on 10 previous occasions. Their most recent win came in 1989 when they defeated AS Monaco 4–3. They had reached the final of the competition a total of 16 times. The last time they had played in the final was in 1991 when they lost 1–0 to AS Monaco.

Paris Saint-Germain had won the competition on six previous occasions – only Olympique de Marseille had won the cup more often and AS Saint-Étienne had also won it six times. Paris Saint-Germain, which had reached the final a total of eight times, had won the cup two seasons prior when they defeated LB Châteauroux 1–0.

== Road to the final ==
=== Olympique de Marseille ===
In the round of 64, Olympique de Marseille defeated Ligue 2 club Le Havre AC 4–0 at the Stade Vélodrome on 8 January 2006. They then faced Ligue 1 club FC Metz in the round of 32 at the Stade Vélodrome on 1 February 2006 and won 2–0. Olympique de Marseille progressed to the quarter-finals with a 2–0 against FC Sochaux-Montbéliard of Ligue 1 at the Stade Vélodrome on 22 March 2006. In the quarter-finals, Olympique de Marseille defeated Olympique Lyonnais 2–1 at the Stade de Gerland on 11 April 2006. They then progressed to the final nine days later with a 3–0 win against Stade Rennais FC at the Stade Vélodrome.

=== Paris Saint-Germain ===
Paris Saint-Germain began their run in the competition on 7 January 2006 with a 4–0 win against Division d'Honneur club US Vermelles at the Stade Léo Lagrange in the round of 64. They then defeated Ligue 1 club AJ Auxerre 1–0 at the Parc des Princes on 1 February 2006 in the round of 32. On 14 March 2006, Paris Saint-Germain defeated Championnat de France Amateur club Lyon-La Duchère 3–0 at the Stade de Balmont to progress to the quarter-finals. In the quarter-finals, they won 2–1 against Lille OSC at the Parc des Princes on 11 April 2006. Nine dayes later, in the semi-finals, Paris Saint-Germain defeated FC Nantes 2–1 at the Stade de la Beaujoire.

Marseille			Round	Paris Saint-Germain
Opponent	H/A	Result	2005–06 Coupe de France	Opponent	H/A	Result
Le Havre	H	4–0	Round of 64	Vermelles	A	4–0
Metz	H	2–0	Round of 32	Auxerre	H	1–0
Sochaux	H	2–0	Round of 16	Lyon-Duchère	A	3–0
Lyon	A	2–1	Quarter-finals	Lille	H	2–1
Rennes	H	3–0	Semi-finals	Nantes	A	2–1

== Match details ==
29 April 2006
20:45

Marseille	1–2	Paris Saint-Germain
Maoulida 67'		Kalou 5'; Dhorasoo 49'

Stade de France, Saint-Denis
Attendance: 79,061
Referee: Laurent Duhamel

Marseille	Paris Saint-Germain

MARSEILLE:
GK	1	(France) Fabien Barthez (c)
RB	2	(Senegal) Habib Beye		(substituted off) 80'
CB	4	(France) Frédéric Déhu
CB	6	(Argentina) Renato Civelli
LB	3	(Nigeria) Taye Taiwo	(yellow card) 82'
CM	10	(France) Sabri Lamouchi
CM	5	(Albania) Lorik Cana
LW	8	(France) Toifilou Maoulida
AM	7	(France) Franck Ribéry
RW	9	(Senegal) Mamadou Niang
CF	11	(France) Mickael Pagis		(substituted off) 38'
Substitutes:
GK	12	(France) Cédric Carrasso
DF	13	(France) Alain Cantareil
MF	14	(Nigeria) Wilson Oruma	(yellow card) 43'	(substituted on) 38'
MF	15	(France) Samir Nasri		(substituted on) 80'
FW	16	(Argentina) Christian Giménez
Manager:
(France) Jean Fernández Assistant Referees: Fourth Official:

PSG:
GK	1	(France) Lionel Letizi	(yellow card) 84'
RB	5	(France) Bernard Mendy
CB	4	(Czech Republic) David Rozehnal
CB	6	(Colombia) Mario Yepes
LB	3	(France) Sylvain Armand	(yellow card) 57'
CM	2	(Cameroon) Modeste M'bami	(yellow card) 43'
CM	8	(France) Édouard Cissé
RW	10	(France) Vikash Dhorasoo
AM	7	(Ivory Coast) Bonaventure Kalou
LW	11	(France) Jérôme Rothen		(substituted off) 87'
CF	9	(Portugal) Pauleta (c)	(yellow card) 82'
Substitutes:
GK	12	(France) Jérôme Alonzo
MF	13	(France) Christophe Landrin
MF	15	(Brazil) Paulo César		(substituted on) 87'
FW	14	(France) Fabrice Pancrate
FW	16	(Uruguay) Carlos Bueno
Manager:
(France) Guy Lacombe

== See also ==
- 2005–06 Coupe de France
- Le Classique
