= 1987 Coupe de France final =

- Event: 1986–87 Coupe de France
Bordeaux	Marseille
2	0
- Date: 10 June 1987
- Venue: Parc des Princes, Paris
- Referee: Michel Vautrot
- Attendance: 45,145

The 1987 Coupe de France final was a football match held at Parc des Princes, Paris on 10 June 1987, that saw FC Girondins de Bordeaux defeat Olympique de Marseille 2–0 thanks to goals by Philippe Fargeon and Zlatko Vujović.

== Match details ==
10 June 1987

Bordeaux	2–0	Marseille
Fargeon 14'; Zl. Vujović 88'

Parc des Princes, Paris
Attendance: 45,145
Referee: Michel Vautrot

GK	1	(France) Dominique Dropsy
DF	2	(France) Jean-Christophe Thouvenel
DF	4	(Socialist Federal Republic of Yugoslavia) Zoran Vujović
DF	3	(France) Léonard Specht
DF	5	(France) Alain Roche
MF	6	(France) René Girard (c)
MF	8	(France) Jean Tigana
MF	7	(France) José Touré
MF	10	(France) Jean-Marc Ferreri
FW	9	(France) Philippe Fargeon
FW	11	(Socialist Federal Republic of Yugoslavia) Zlatko Vujović
Substitutes:
Manager:
(France) Aimé Jacquet Assistant Referees: Fourth Official:

GK	1	(Cameroon) Joseph-Antoine Bell (c)
DF	2	(France) Christophe Galtier	(substituted off) 53'
DF	3	(France) Jean-Pierre Bade
DF	4	(West Germany) Karlheinz Förster
DF	6	(France) Jean-François Domergue
MF	5	(France) Franck Passi
MF	7	(France) Thierry Laurey	(substituted off) 46'
MF	8	(France) Alain Giresse
MF	10	(Socialist Federal Republic of Yugoslavia) Blaž Slišković
FW	9	(France) Jean-Pierre Papin
FW	11	(Senegal) Abdoulaye Diallo
Substitutes:
MF	13	(France) Bernard Genghini	(substituted on) 46'
FW	14	(France) Patrick Cubaynes	(substituted on) 53'
Manager:
(France) Gérard Banide

== See also ==
- Coupe de France 1986–87
