= 1991 Coupe de France final =

- Event: 1990–91 Coupe de France
Monaco	Marseille
1	0
- Date: 8 June 1991
- Venue: Parc des Princes, Paris
- Referee: Joël Quiniou
- Attendance: 44,123

The 1991 Coupe de France final was a football match played at Parc des Princes, Paris, on 8 June 1991 that saw AS Monaco FC defeat Olympique de Marseille 1–0 thanks to a goal by Gérald Passi, assisted by Ramón Díaz.

== Road to the final ==
Monaco			Round	Marseille
Opponent	H/A	Result	1990–91 Coupe de France	Opponent	H/A	Result
Saint-Seurin	H	1–0	Round of 64	Strasbourg	A	4–1
Lille	A	3–1	Round of 32	Dijon	H	3–0
Toulon	A	3–2	Round of 16	Paris SG	A	2–0
Cannes	A	2–1	Quarter-finals	Nantes	A	2–1 (a.e.t.)
Gueugnon	H	5–0	Semi-finals	Rodez	A	4–1

== Match details ==
8 June 1991
20:00

Monaco	1–0	Marseille
Passi 90'

Parc des Princes, Paris
Attendance: 44,123
Referee: Joël Quiniou

GK	1	(France) Jean-Luc Ettori (c)
DF	6	(France) Claude Puel
DF	3	(France) Luc Sonor
DF	4	(France) Emmanuel Petit
DF	2	(Senegal) Roger Mendy
MF	8	(France) Marcel Dib
MF	10	(Portugal) Rui Barros
MF	5	(France) Franck Sauzée
MF	11	(France) Youri Djorkaeff	(substituted off) 59'
FW	9	(Liberia) George Weah
FW	7	(Ivory Coast) Youssouf Fofana	(substituted off) 75'
Substitutes:
MF	16	(France) Gérald Passi	(substituted on) 59'
FW	15	(Argentina) Ramón Díaz	(substituted on) 75'
Manager:
(France) Arsène Wenger

GK	1	(France) Pascal Olmeta
DF	2	(France) Manuel Amoros
DF	7	(France) Laurent Fournier	(substituted off) 46'
DF	3	(France) Basile Boli
DF	4	(Brazil) Carlos Mozer
MF	5	(France) Bruno Germain
MF	6	(France) Bernard Casoni
MF	8	(England) Chris Waddle
MF	11	(France) Philippe Vercruysse
FW	9	(France) Jean-Pierre Papin (c)
FW	10	(Ghana) Abedi Pele
Substitutes:
MF	13	(Socialist Federal Republic of Yugoslavia) Dragan Stojković	(substituted on) 46'
Manager:
(Belgium) Raymond Goethals

== See also ==
- 1990–91 Coupe de France
