= Abdoulaye Diallo (footballer, born 1963) =

Senegalese footballer

Personal information
- Date of birth: 27 January 1963 (age 63)
- Place of birth: Dakar, Senegal
- Height: 1.71 m (5 ft 7 in)
- Position: Forward

Senior career*
Years	Team	Apps	(Gls)
1980–1983	ASC Niayes-Pikine		
1983–1990	Marseille	155	(19)
1990–1992	Bastia	56	(12)

International career
1990	Senegal		
- * Club domestic league appearances and goals

Abdoulaye Diallo (born 27 January 1963) is a Senegalese former professional footballer who played as a forward.
