= André Chorda =

French footballer (1938–1998)

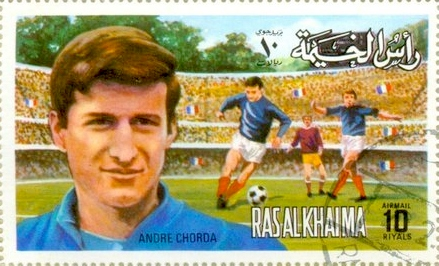

Personal information
- Date of birth: 20 February 1938
- Place of birth: Charleval, France
- Date of death: 18 June 1998 (aged 60)
- Place of death: Nice, France
- Position: Defender

Youth career
- Amiens

Senior career*
Years	Team	Apps	(Gls)
1957–1962	Nice	132	(2)
1962–1969	Bordeaux	220	(12)
1970–1974	Nice	159	(3)
Total		484	(17)

International career
1960–1966	France	24	(0)
- * Club domestic league appearances and goals

André Chorda (20 February 1938 – 18 June 1998) was a French footballer who played as a defender. He played for France in the 1966 FIFA World Cup.

== Titles ==
- French championship in 1959 with OGC Nice
