= Fleury Di Nallo =

French footballer (1943–2026)

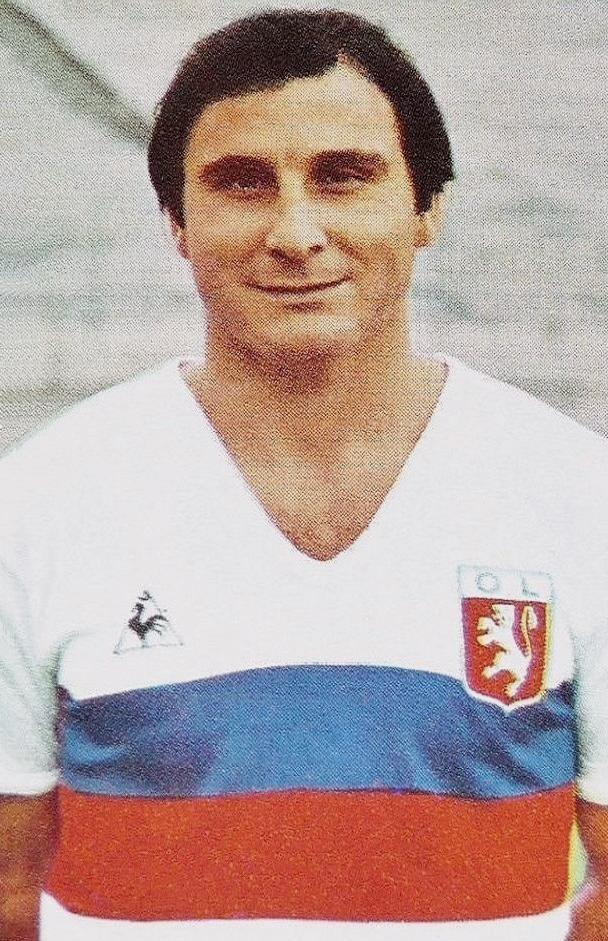
- Di Nallo with Lyon in 1970

Personal information
- Date of birth: 20 April 1943
- Place of birth: Lyon, German-occupied France
- Date of death: 13 May 2026 (aged 83)
- Height: 1.67 m (5 ft 6 in)
- Position: Forward

Senior career*
Years	Team	Apps	(Gls)
1960–1974	Lyon	413	(182)
1974–1975	Red Star	12	(5)
1975–1978	Montpellier	50	(28)
Total		475	(215)

International career
1962–1971	France	10	(8)
- * Club domestic league appearances and goals

Fleury Di Nallo (20 April 1943 – 13 May 2026) was a French professional footballer who played as a striker. One of the best forwards in the Division 1 in the 1960s and 1970s, he is the top scorer in the history of Olympique Lyonnais, where he played fourteen years.

== Career ==
Nicknamed le petit prince de Gerland (transl. the little prince of Gerland) by Lyon fans, Di Nallo played 489 games and scored 222 goals for the club. In total, he scored 187 goals in the French Division 1, 182 with Lyon.

In his first full season with Lyon, he scored 21 goals in 23 league games, including three hat-tricks and four goals in six Coupe de France matches. He was capped 10 times for the France national team between 1962 and 1971, scoring twice on his international debut in a 3–2 defeat against Hungary.

From 2005 to 2008, he was coach of AS Misérieux Trévoux Club. In October 2008, he signed with FC Corbas as sports adviser.

== Later life and death ==
The owner of a sports shop in Lyon, in 1987 Di Nallo was implicated in a credit card fraud case, which led to him being tried and convicted in 1988.

In 2022, the French football magazine So Foot ranked him 35th in its list of the top 1,000 players in the French league.

Di Nallo died on 13 May 2026, at the age of 83.

== Honours ==
Lyon

- Coupe de France: 1964, 1967, 1973

== External links and references ==
- Fleury Di Nallo at the French Football Federation (in French)
- Fleury Di Nallo at the French Football Federation (archived) (in French)
- Fleury Di Nallo profile at pari-et-gagne.com
