= 2015 Coupe de France final =

Final of the 2014–15 edition of the Coupe de France

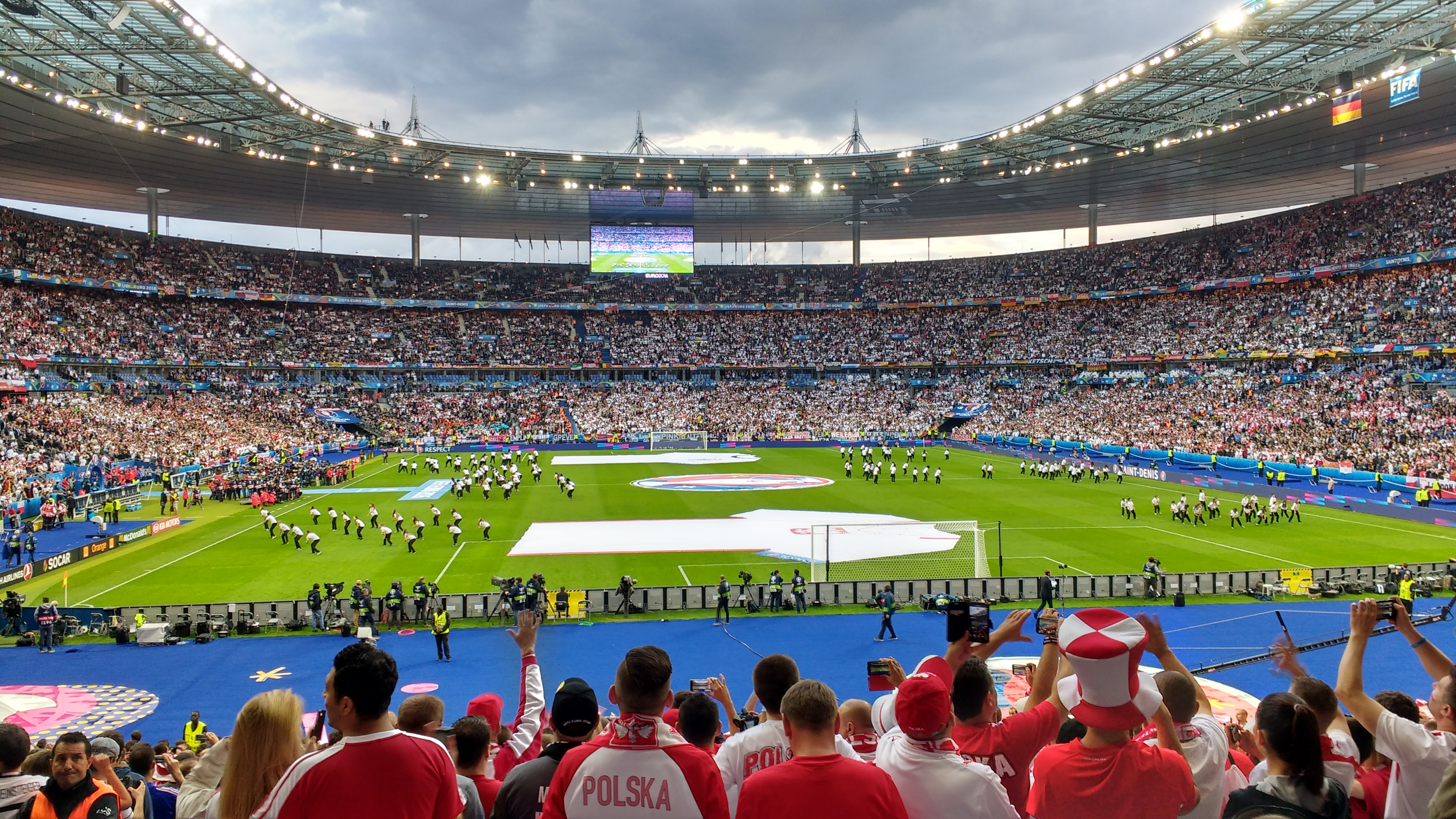
- Stade de France
- Event: 2014–15 Coupe de France
Auxerre	Paris Saint-Germain
Ligue 2	Ligue 1
0	1
- Date: 30 May 2015
- Venue: Stade de France, Saint-Denis
- Referee: Antony Gautier
- Attendance: 80,000

The 2015 Coupe de France final decided the winner of the 2014–15 Coupe de France, the 98th season of France's premier football cup. It was played on 30 May at the Stade de France in Saint-Denis, Paris, between Ligue 2 club Auxerre and Paris Saint-Germain of Ligue 1. Paris Saint-Germain won the match 1–0 with a goal by Edinson Cavani, thus achieving their ninth title.

== Background ==
It was Auxerre's sixth final, of which they had previously won four and lost one. Their last final was in 2005, a 2–1 win over Sedan, and their last defeat was their first final, losing 1–4 after extra time to Nantes in 1979. PSG played in their 13th final, having won 8 (second only to Marseille's 10). Their most recent final was in 2011, a 0–1 defeat to Lille, and their last victory was the season before that, a 1–0 win over Monaco after extra time. The two teams met in the 2003 final, which Auxerre won 2–1.

== Road to the final ==
Auxerre			Round	Paris Saint-Germain
Opponent	H/A	Result	2014–15 Coupe de France	Opponent	H/A	Result
Dinsheim	A	3–0	Seventh Round	Bye	—	—
Sarreguemines	A	4–0	Eighth Round	Bye	—	—
Strasbourg	H	1–0	Round of 64	Montpellier	A	3–0
Jura Sud Lavans	A	1–0	Round of 32	Bordeaux	H	2–1
Le Poiré	A	1–1 (a.e.t.) (6–5 pen.)	Round of 16	Nantes	H	2–0
Brest	A	0–0 (a.e.t.) (4–2 pen.)	Quarter-finals	Monaco	H	2–0
Guingamp	H	1–0	Semi-finals	Saint-Étienne	H	4–1

=== Auxerre ===
Auxerre, of Ligue 2, entered the competition in the seventh round, winning 2–0 at seventh-tier Dinsheim on 15 November. In the eighth round on 6 December, they won 3–0 away to Sarreguemines of the Championnat de France amateur 2.

In the last 64 on 4 January 2015, Auxerre won 1–0 against Championnat National club Strasbourg at the Stade de l'Abbé-Deschamps with a goal by Vincent Gragnic in the last minute of the first half. Sixteen days later in the last 32 they triumphed by the same score away to Championnat de France amateur club Jura Sud Lavans, with a first-half goal by Samed Kılıç.

Auxerre played away to third-tier Le Poiré in the last 16 on 10 February. Livio Nabab put them ahead in the second half, with Loïc Dufau equalising in added time. Auxerre won 6–5 in a penalty shootout. A shootout was also required on 5 March in the quarter-finals after a goalless draw at fellow Ligue 2 club Brest. Youssef Adnane missed their first attempt before Thomas Fontaine missed for Brest, with Frédéric Sammaritano scoring the decisive goal for Auxerre. On 7 April, Sammartino scored the only goal of a semi-final victory against Ligue 1 club and cup holders Guingamp, but Jamel Aït Ben Idir was sent off.

=== Paris Saint-Germain ===
Paris Saint-Germain, of Ligue 1, began the tournament in the last 64 with a 3–0 win away to fellow top-flight side Montpellier on 5 January 2015, with second-half goals by Clément Chantôme, Zlatan Ibrahimović and Lucas Moura. Sixteen days later in the last 32, they hosted Bordeaux and won 2–1. An Edinson Cavani header and a Javier Pastore goal gave PSG the lead at half time, although Diego Rolán scored for Bordeaux in the first minute of the second half and the hosts had Zoumana Camara sent off.

On 11 February, PSG defeated Nantes 2–0 at home in the last 16 with goals by Cavani and Yohan Cabaye while Ibrahimović was rested. In the quarter-finals on 4 March they won by the same score against Monaco, David Luiz opening the scoring after three minutes and Cavani doubling the lead later on. PSG won 4–1 in their semi-final against Saint-Étienne on 8 April, with a hat-trick by Ibrahimović which took him to 102 goals for the club, starting with a penalty for the 100th.

== Match details ==
30 May 2015
21:00 CEST

Auxerre	0–1	Paris Saint-Germain
	Report	Cavani 64'

Stade de France, Saint-Denis
Attendance: 80,000
Referee: Antony Gautier

AUXERRE:
GK	30	(French Guiana) Donovan Léon
RB	2	(France) Ruben Aguilar
CB	4	(France) Sébastien Puygrenier (c)
CB	3	(France) Thomas Fontaine
LB	17	(France) Karim Djellabi (yellow card) 28'
CM	27	(France) Rémi Mulumba (substituted off) 86'
CM	6	(Morocco) Jamel Aït Ben Idir (yellow card) 90'
RW	20	(France) Grégory Berthier (substituted off) 80'
AM	9	(France) Frédéric Sammaritano
LW	15	(France) Amara Baby (substituted off) 82'
CF	26	(Mali) Cheick Diarra (yellow card) 76'
Substitutes:
GK	1	(Central African Republic) Geoffrey Lembet
DF	5	(Gabon) Henri Ndong
MF	7	(France) Pierre Bouby
MF	8	(France) Samed Kılıç
FW	10	(France) Julien Viale (substituted on) 82'
FW	22	(Guadeloupe) Livio Nabab (substituted on) 80'
FW	34	(France) Alexandre Vincent (substituted on) 86'
Manager:
(France) Jean-Luc Vannuchi

PARIS SAINT-GERMAIN:
GK	1	(France) Nicolas Douchez
RB	23	(Netherlands) Gregory van der Wiel
CB	2	(Brazil) Thiago Silva (c)
CB	32	(Brazil) David Luiz (yellow card) 60'
LB	17	(Brazil) Maxwell
DM	8	(Italy) Thiago Motta
CM	24	(Italy) Marco Verratti (yellow card) 51'
CM	14	(France) Blaise Matuidi
RW	7	(Brazil) Lucas (substituted off) 73'
LW	9	(Uruguay) Edinson Cavani
CF	10	(Sweden) Zlatan Ibrahimović
Substitutes:
GK	30	(Italy) Salvatore Sirigu
DF	5	(Brazil) Marquinhos
DF	19	(Ivory Coast) Serge Aurier
DF	21	(France) Lucas Digne
MF	4	(France) Yohan Cabaye
FW	15	(France) Jean-Christophe Bahebeck
FW	22	(Argentina) Ezequiel Lavezzi (substituted on) 73'
Manager:
(France) Laurent Blanc
