= Ángel Rambert =

French footballer (1936-1983)

Personal information
- Date of birth: 12 June 1936
- Place of birth: Buenos Aires, Argentina
- Date of death: 25 October 1983 (aged 47)
- Position: Striker

Senior career*
Years	Team	Apps	(Gls)
1958–1959	Lanús	36	(11)
1960–1970	Lyon	315	(56)
1970–1971	Avignon Foot 84	30	(7)

International career
1962–1964	France	5	(1)
- * Club domestic league appearances and goals

Ángel Rambert (12 June 1936 – 25 October 1983) was a footballer. He played as a striker for Lanús, Lyon and Avignon Foot 84. Born in Argentina, he represented the France national team.

He is the grandson of a French expatriate.

Ángel's son Sebastián also played professional football, representing the Argentina national team.
