= List of AS Monaco FC seasons =

The following list is a list of AS Monaco FC seasons.

== Key ==
- Div 1 = Ligue 1
- Div 2 = Ligue 2
- Pld = Matches played
- W = Matches won
- D = Matches drawn
- L = Matches lost
- GF = Goals for
- GA = Goals against
- Pts = Points
- Pos = Final position
- F = Final
- SF = Semi-finals
- QF = Quarter-finals
- R16 = Round of 16
- R32 = Round of 32
- R64 = Round of 64
- R128 = Round of 128
- GS = Group stage
- PR = Preliminary round
- Q1 = First qualifying round
- Q2 = Second qualifying round
- Q3 = Third qualifying round
- PO = Play-off round
- KPO = Knockout phase play-offs
- 1R = First round
- 2R = Second round
- 3R = Third round

| 1st or W | Winners |
| 2nd or RU | Runners-up |
| ↑ | Promoted |
| ↓ | Relegated |
| ♦ | Most goals in division |

== Seasons ==
Results of league and cup competitions by season
| Season | Division | Pld | W | D | L | GF | GA | Pts | Pos | French Cup | League Cup | Super Cup | Competition | Result | Player(s) | Goals |
| Season | League | | | | | | | | | French Cup | League Cup | Super Cup | Europe | | Top league scorer(s)^{[B]} | |
|---|---|---|---|---|---|---|---|---|---|---|---|---|---|---|---|---|
| 1948–49 | Div 2 | 36 | 17 | 4 | 15 | 70 | 62 | 38 | 8th | ?? | | — | — | — | Max Payan | 15 |
| 1949–50 | Div 2 | 34 | 11 | 7 | 16 | 40 | 53 | 29 | 16th | R16 | | — | — | — | Jean Miramond | 11 |
| 1950–51 | Div 2 | 32 | 13 | 11 | 8 | 56 | 43 | 37 | 5th | R32 | ? | — | — | — | Michel Habera | 13 |
| 1951–52 | Div 2 | 34 | 16 | 8 | 10 | 54 | 40 | 40 | 5th | QF | ?? | — | — | — | Raúl Conti | 13 |
| 1952–53 | Div 2 | 34 | 24 | 7 | 3 | 88 | 23 | 55 | 2nd | R16 | ? | — | — | — | Jean Palluch | 22 |
| 1953–54 | Div 1 | 34 | 11 | 9 | 14 | 44 | 48 | 31 | 10th | R32 | | — | — | — | Henri Skiba | 14 |
| 1954–55 | Div 1 | 34 | 10 | 11 | 13 | 43 | 45 | 31 | 14th | R32 | | — | — | — | Theodor Brinek | 9 |
| 1955–56 | Div 1 | 34 | 17 | 7 | 10 | 63 | 45 | 41 | 3rd | R32 | — | — | — | — | Raúl Conti | 16 |
| 1956–57 | Div 1 | 34 | 17 | 6 | 11 | 57 | 44 | 40 | 5th | R16 | — | — | — | — | Antoine Keller | 13 |
| 1957–58 | Div 1 | 34 | 15 | 11 | 8 | 50 | 35 | 41 | 4th | SF | — | — | — | — | Serge Roy | 12 |
| 1958–59 | Div 1 | 38 | 14 | 11 | 13 | 52 | 51 | 39 | 8th | R32 | — | — | — | — | Ernst Stojaspal | 10 |
| 1959–60 | Div 1 | 38 | 19 | 7 | 12 | 70 | 45 | 45 | 4th | W | — | — | — | — | Serge Roy | 13 |
| 1960–61 | Div 1 | 38 | 26 | 5 | 7 | 77 | 42 | 57 | 1st | R32 | — | RU | — | — | Lucien Cossou | 18 |
| 1961–62 | Div 1 | 38 | 17 | 9 | 12 | 65 | 57 | 43 | 6th | QF | — | W | European Cup | PR | Yvon Douis | 12 |
| 1962–63 | Div 1 | 38 | 20 | 10 | 8 | 77 | 44 | 50 | 1st | W | — | — | — | — | Lucien Cossou | 28 |
| 1963–64 | Div 1 | 34 | 17 | 7 | 10 | 62 | 45 | 41 | 2nd | R16 | — | — | European Cup | R16 | Lucien Cossou | 21 |
| 1964–65 | Div 1 | 34 | 13 | 7 | 14 | 41 | 45 | 33 | 12th | R16 | | — | — | — | Lucien Cossou Yvon Douis | 10 |
| 1965–66 | Div 1 | 38 | 13 | 9 | 16 | 48 | 54 | 35 | 13th | R32 | | — | — | — | Yvon Douis | 11 |
| 1966–67 | Div 1 | 38 | 10 | 14 | 14 | 44 | 44 | 34 | 14th | QF | ? | — | — | — | Philippe Piat | 16 |
| 1967–68 | Div 1 | 38 | 15 | 7 | 16 | 45 | 48 | 37 | 11th | ?? | | — | — | — | Pierre Dell’Oste | 10 |
| 1968–69 | Div 1 | 34 | 7 | 13 | 14 | 33 | 50 | 27 | 17th | ?? | | — | — | — | Pierre Dell’Oste | 8 |
| 1969–70 | Div 2 | 30 | 10 | 8 | 12 | 38 | 44 | 28 | 8th | ?? | | — | — | — | Louis Floch Stevan Ostojić | 6 |
| 1970–71 | Div 2 (C) | 30 | 22 | 3 | 5 | 71 | 23 | 47 | 1st | QF | ? | — | — | — | Emmanuel Koum | 20 ♦ |
| 1971–72 | Div 1 | 38 | 8 | 10 | 20 | 41 | 68 | 26 | 19th | ?? | | — | — | — | Louis Floch | 10 |
| 1972–73 | Div 2 (B) | 34 | 23 | 5 | 6 | 89 | 29 | 51 | 2nd | ?? | | — | — | — | Carlos Ruiter | 26 |
| 1973–74 | Div 1 | 38 | 11 | 11 | 16 | 64 | 73 | 41 | 16th | RU | | — | — | — | Delio Onnis | 26 |
| 1974–75 | Div 1 | 38 | 18 | 4 | 16 | 64 | 68 | 42 | 10th | ?? | | — | Cup Winners' Cup | R32 | Delio Onnis | 30 ♦ |
| 1975–76 | Div 1 | 38 | 12 | 9 | 17 | 53 | 73 | 35 | 18th | ?? | | — | — | — | Delio Onnis | 29 |
| 1976–77 | Div 2 (A) | 34 | 19 | 10 | 5 | 64 | 35 | 48 | 1st | R16 | | — | — | — | Delio Onnis | 30 ♦ |
| 1977–78 | Div 1 | 38 | 22 | 9 | 7 | 79 | 46 | 53 | 1st | SF | | — | — | — | Delio Onnis | 29 |
| 1978–79 | Div 1 | 38 | 18 | 8 | 12 | 70 | 51 | 44 | 4th | R16 | ? | — | European Cup | R32 | Delio Onnis | 22 |
| 1979–80 | Div 1 | 38 | 21 | 8 | 9 | 61 | 30 | 50 | 4th | W | | — | UEFA Cup | R32 | Delio Onnis | 21 ♦ |
| 1980–81 | Div 1 | 38 | 19 | 11 | 8 | 58 | 41 | 49 | 4th | R16 | | — | Cup Winners' Cup | R32 | Victor Trossero | 18 |
| 1981–82 | Div 1 | 38 | 24 | 7 | 7 | 70 | 29 | 55 | 1st | R16 | | — | UEFA Cup | R64 | Ralf Edström | 15 |
| 1982–83 | Div 1 | 38 | 14 | 15 | 9 | 55 | 35 | 43 | 6th | R16 | | — | European Cup | R32 | Umberto Barberis | 12 |
| 1983–84 | Div 1 | 38 | 22 | 10 | 6 | 58 | 29 | 54 | 2nd | RU | | — | — | — | Bernard Genghini | 18 |
| 1984–85 | Div 1 | 38 | 18 | 12 | 8 | 65 | 28 | 48 | 3rd | W | | — | UEFA Cup | R64 | Philippe Anziani Bernard Genghini | 14 |
| 1985–86 | Div 1 | 38 | 9 | 19 | 10 | 49 | 42 | 45 | 9th | ?? | | W | Cup Winners' Cup | R32 | Bernard Genghini | 13 |
| 1986–87 | Div 1 | 38 | 15 | 15 | 8 | 41 | 33 | 45 | 5th | R16 | | — | — | — | Omar da Fonseca | 9 |
| 1987–88 | Div 1 | 38 | 20 | 12 | 6 | 53 | 29 | 52 | 1st | R32 | | — | — | — | Mark Hateley | 14 |
| 1988–89 | Div 1 | 38 | 18 | 14 | 6 | 62 | 38 | 68 | 3rd | RU | ? | — | European Cup | QF | Glenn Hoddle | 18 |
| 1989–90 | Div 1 | 38 | 15 | 16 | 7 | 38 | 24 | 46 | 3rd | R64 | | — | Cup Winners' Cup | SF | Ramón Díaz | 15 |
| 1990–91 | Div 1 | 38 | 20 | 11 | 7 | 51 | 30 | 51 | 2nd | W | ? | — | UEFA Cup | R16 | George Weah | 10 |
| 1991–92 | Div 1 | 38 | 22 | 8 | 8 | 55 | 33 | 52 | 2nd | F* | ? | — | Cup Winners' Cup | RU | George Weah | 18 |
| 1992–93 | Div 1 | 38 | 21 | 9 | 8 | 56 | 29 | 51 | 3rd* | R16 | ? | — | Cup Winners' Cup | R16 | Jürgen Klinsmann | 20 |
| 1993–94 | Div 1 | 38 | 14 | 13 | 11 | 52 | 36 | 41 | 9th | R16 | ? | — | Champions League | SF | Youri Djorkaeff | 20 ♦ |
| 1994–95 | Div 1 | 38 | 15 | 12 | 11 | 60 | 39 | 57 | 6th | R32 | | — | — | — | Youri Djorkaeff | 14 |
| 1995–96 | Div 1 | 38 | 19 | 11 | 8 | 64 | 39 | 68 | 3rd | R16 | ? | — | UEFA Cup | R1 | Sonny Anderson | 21 ♦ |
| 1996–97 | Div 1 | 38 | 23 | 10 | 5 | 69 | 30 | 79 | 1st | ?? | | — | UEFA Cup | SF | Sonny Anderson | 19 |
| 1997–98 | Div 1 | 34 | 18 | 5 | 11 | 51 | 33 | 59 | 3rd | QF | ? | W | Champions League | SF | David Trezeguet | 18 |
| 1998–99 | Div 1 | 34 | 18 | 8 | 8 | 52 | 32 | 62 | 4th | ? | ? | — | UEFA Cup | R16 | David Trezeguet | 12 |
| 1999–2000 | Div 1 | 34 | 20 | 5 | 9 | 69 | 38 | 65 | 1st | SF | ? | — | UEFA Cup | R16 | David Trezeguet | 22 |
| 2000–01 | Div 1 | 34 | 12 | 7 | 15 | 53 | 50 | 43 | 11th | R64 | RU | W | Champions League | GS | Shabani Nonda | 12 |
| 2001–02 | Div 1 | 34 | 9 | 12 | 13 | 36 | 41 | 39 | 15th | QF | QF | — | — | — | Shabani Nonda | 14 |
| 2002–03 | Div 1 | 38 | 19 | 10 | 9 | 66 | 33 | 67 | 2nd | R64 | W | — | — | — | Shabani Nonda | 26 ♦ |
| 2003–04 | Div 1 | 38 | 21 | 12 | 5 | 59 | 30 | 75 | 3rd | QF | R16 | — | Champions League | RU | Ludovic Giuly | 13 |
| 2004–05 | Div 1 | 38 | 15 | 18 | 5 | 52 | 35 | 63 | 3rd | SF | SF | — | Champions League | R16 | Javier Chevantón Mohamed Kallon | 10 |
| 2005–06 | Div 1 | 38 | 13 | 13 | 12 | 42 | 36 | 52 | 10th | R32 | SF | — | UEFA Cup † | R32 | Javier Chevantón | 10 |
| 2006–07 | Div 1 | 38 | 13 | 12 | 13 | 45 | 38 | 51 | 9th | R16 | R16 | — | — | — | Jan Koller | 8 |
| 2007–08 | Div 1 | 38 | 13 | 8 | 17 | 40 | 48 | 47 | 12th | R32 | R16 | — | — | — | Jérémy Ménez Frédéric Piquionne | 7 |
| 2008–09 | Div 1 | 38 | 11 | 12 | 15 | 41 | 45 | 45 | 11th | QF | 3R | — | — | — | Alexandre Licata | 7 |
| 2009–10 | Div 1 | 38 | 15 | 10 | 13 | 39 | 45 | 55 | 8th | RU | 3R | — | — | — | Nenê | 14 |
| 2010–11 | Div 1 | 38 | 9 | 17 | 12 | 36 | 40 | 44 | 18th | R64 | QF | — | — | — | Park Chu-young | 12 |
| 2011–12 | Div 2 | 38 | 13 | 13 | 12 | 41 | 48 | 52 | 8th | R64 | 1R | — | — | — | Ibrahima Touré | 10 |
| 2012–13 | Div 2 | 38 | 21 | 13 | 4 | 64 | 33 | 76 | 1st | R128 | R16 | — | — | — | Ibrahima Touré | 18 |
| 2013–14 | Div 1 | 38 | 23 | 11 | 4 | 64 | 31 | 80 | 2nd | SF | 3R | — | — | — | Emmanuel Rivière | 10 |
| 2014–15 | Div 1 | 38 | 20 | 11 | 7 | 51 | 26 | 71 | 3rd | QF | SF | — | Champions League | QF | Anthony Martial Bernardo Silva | 9 |
| 2015–16 | Div 1 | 38 | 17 | 14 | 7 | 57 | 50 | 65 | 3rd | R16 | R16 | — | Champions League Europa League | PO GS | Bernardo Silva | 7 |
| 2016–17 | Div 1 | 38 | 30 | 5 | 3 | 107 | 31 | 95 | 1st | SF | RU | — | Champions League | SF | Radamel Falcao | 21 |
| 2017–18 | Div 1 | 38 | 24 | 8 | 6 | 85 | 45 | 80 | 2nd | R32 | RU | RU | Champions League | GS | Radamel Falcao | 18 |
| 2018–19 | Div 1 | 38 | 8 | 12 | 18 | 38 | 57 | 36 | 17th | R32 | SF | RU | Champions League | GS | Radamel Falcao | 15 |
| 2019–20 | Div 1 | 28 | 11 | 7 | 10 | 44 | 44 | 40 | 9th | R16 | R16 | — | — | — | Wissam Ben Yedder | 18 ♦ |
| 2020–21 | Div 1 | 38 | 24 | 6 | 8 | 76 | 42 | 78 | 3rd | RU | — | — | — | — | Wissam Ben Yedder | 20 |
| 2021–22 | Div 1 | 38 | 20 | 9 | 9 | 65 | 40 | 69 | 3rd | SF | — | — | Champions League Europa League | PO R16 | Wissam Ben Yedder | 25 |
| 2022–23 | Div 1 | 38 | 19 | 8 | 11 | 70 | 58 | 65 | 6th | R64 | — | — | Champions League Europa League | Q3 KPO | Wissam Ben Yedder | 19 |
| 2023–24 | Div 1 | 34 | 20 | 7 | 7 | 68 | 42 | 67 | 2nd | R16 | — | — | — | — | Wissam Ben Yedder | 16 |
| 2024–25 | Div 1 | 34 | 18 | 7 | 9 | 63 | 41 | 61 | 3rd | R32 | — | RU | Champions League | KPO | Mika Biereth | 13 |
| 2025–26 | Div 1 | 34 | 16 | 6 | 12 | 60 | 54 | 54 | 7th | R16 | — | — | Champions League | KPO | Folarin Balogun | 13 |

== Honours ==
Domestic

- Ligue 1
  - Winners (8): 1960–61, 1962–63, 1977–78, 1981–82, 1987–88, 1996–97, 1999–2000, 2016–17
  - Runners-up (8): 1963–64, 1983–84, 1990–91, 1991–92, 2002–03, 2013–14, 2017–18, 2023–24
- Ligue 2
  - Winners (1): 2012–13
  - Runners-up (3): 1952–53, 1970–71, 1976–77
- Coupe de France
  - Winners (5): 1959–60, 1962–63, 1979–80, 1984–85, 1990–91
  - Runners-up (5): 1973–74, 1983–84, 1988–89, 2009–10, 2020–21
- Coupe de la Ligue
  - Winners (1): 2002–03
  - Runners-up (3): 2000–01, 2016–17, 2017–18
- Trophée des Champions
  - Winners (4): 1961, 1985, 1997, 2000
  - Runners-up (4): 1960, 2017, 2018, 2024

European

- UEFA Champions League
  - Runners-up (1): 2003–04
- UEFA Cup Winners' Cup
  - Runners-up (1): 1991–92

| Honour | Titles | Seasons |
|---|---|---|
| French Division 1 / Ligue 1 | 8 | 1960–61, 1962–63, 1977–78, 1981–82, 1987–88, 1996–97, 1999–2000, 2016–17 |
| French Division 2 / Ligue 2 | 1 | 2012–13 |
| Coupe de France | 5 | 1959–60, 1962–63, 1979–80, 1984–85, 1990–91 |
| Coupe de la Ligue | 1 | 2002–03 |
| Trophée des Champions | 4 | 1961, 1985, 1997, 2000 |
| UEFA Champions League | 0 | |
| UEFA Cup Winners' Cup | 0 | |
