= 1963 Coupe de France final =

- Event: 1962–63 Coupe de France
Monaco	Lyon
Monaco	Lyon
0	0
- After extra time
- Date: 12 May 1963
- Venue: Olympique Yves-du-Manoir, Colombes
- Referee: Pierre Schwinte
- Attendance: 32,923

Replay
Monaco	Lyon
2	0
- Date: 23 May 1963
- Venue: Parc des Princes, Paris
- Referee: Pierre Schwinte
- Attendance: 24,910

The 1963 Coupe de France final was a football match held at Parc des Princes, Paris, between AS Monaco FC and Olympique Lyonnais. After a goalless draw in the first match on 12 May 1963, Monaco won 2–0 in the replay on 23 May.

== Match details ==
=== First match ===
12 May 1963

Monaco	0–0 (a.e.t.)	Lyon

Stade Olympique Yves-du-Manoir, Colombes
Attendance: 32,923
Referee: Pierre Schwinte

GK	(France) Jean-Claude Hernandez
DF	(France) Georges Casolari
DF	(France) Georges Thomas
DF	(France) Michel Hidalgo (c)
DF	(France) Marcel Artelesa
MF	(France) Henri Biancheri
MF	(Togo) Karimou Djibrill
FW	(France) Yvon Douis
FW	(France) Lucien Cossou
FW	(France) Théodore Szkudlapski
FW	(France) Georges Taberner
Manager:
(France) Lucien Leduc

GK	(France) Marcel Aubour
DF	(France) Marcel Nowak
DF	(France) Aimé Mignot (c)
DF	(France) Lucien Degeorges
DF	(France) Thadée Polak
MF	(France) Marcel Le Borgne
MF	(Luxembourg) Victor Nuremberg
MF	(West Germany) Kurt Linder
MF	(France) (Argentina) Angel Rambert
FW	(France) Fleury Di Nallo
FW	(France) (Argentina) Nestor Combin
Manager:
(France) Lucien Jasseron

=== Replay ===
23 May 1963

Monaco	2–0	Lyon
Cossou 56'; Casolari 84'

Parc des Princes, Paris
Attendance: 24,910
Referee: Pierre Schwinte

GK	(France) Jean-Claude Hernandez
DF	(France) Georges Casolari
DF	(France) Georges Thomas
DF	(France) Michel Hidalgo (c)
DF	(France) Marcel Artelesa
MF	(France) Henri Biancheri
MF	(Togo) Karimou Djibrill
FW	(France) Yvon Douis
FW	(France) Lucien Cossou
FW	(France) Théodore Szkudlapski
FW	(Netherlands) Albertus Carlier
Manager:
(France) Lucien Leduc

GK	(France) Marcel Aubour
DF	(France) Marcel Nowak
DF	(France) Aimé Mignot (c)
DF	(France) Lucien Degeorges
DF	(France) Thadée Polak
MF	(France) Marcel Le Borgne
MF	(Luxembourg) Victor Nuremberg
MF	(West Germany) Kurt Linder
MF	(France) (Argentina) Angel Rambert
FW	(France) Guy Hatchi
FW	(France) (Argentina) Nestor Combin
Manager:
(France) Lucien Jasseron

== See also ==
- 1962–63 Coupe de France
