= 1961 Coupe de France final =

- Event: 1960–61 Coupe de France
Sedan	Nîmes
3	1
- Date: 7 May 1961
- Venue: Olympique Yves-du-Manoir, Colombes
- Referee: Marcel Bois
- Attendance: 39,070

The 1961 Coupe de France final was a football match, held at Stade Olympique Yves-du-Manoir, Colombes on May 7, 1961, that saw UA Sedan-Torcy defeat Nîmes Olympique 3–1, thanks to goals by Maxime Fulgenzy, Claude Brény and Mohamed Salem.

== Match details ==
7 May 1961

Sedan	3–1	Nîmes
Fulgenzy 16'; Brény 74'; Salem 82'		Constantino 86'

Stade Olympique Yves-du-Manoir, Colombes
Attendance: 39,070
Referee: Marcel Bois

GK	(France) Pierre Bernard
DF	(Cameroon) Zacharie Noah
DF	(France) Louis Lemasson
DF	(France) Maryan Synakowski
DF	(France) Thadée Polak
MF	(France) Guy Hatchi
MF	(Spain) Emilio Salaber
FW	(France) Marcel Mouchel	(c)
FW	(Algeria) Mohamed Salem
FW	(France) Maxime Fulgenzy
FW	(France) Claude Brény
Manager:
(France) Louis Dugauguez Assistant Referees: Fourth Official:

GK	(France) Alexandre Roszak
DF	(Morocco) Mustapha Bettache
DF	(France) Jean Bandera
DF	(France) Pierre Barlaguet	(c)
DF	(France) Daniel Charles-Alfred
MF	(France) Christian Oliver
MF	(France) Alain Garnier
MF	(Brazil) Pirès Constantino
FW	(Morocco) Hassan Akesbi
FW	(France) Alphonse Cassar
FW	(France) Bernard Rahis
Manager:
(France) (Algeria) Kader Firoud

== See also ==
- Coupe de France 1960-61
