= 1956 Coupe de France final =

Final of the 1955–56 edition of the Coupe de France

- Event: 1955–56 Coupe de France
Sedan	Troyes-Savinienne
3	1
- Date: 27 May 1956
- Venue: Olympique Yves-du-Manoir, Colombes
- Referee: Maurice Guigue
- Attendance: 47,258

The 1956 Coupe de France final was a football match held at Stade Olympique Yves-du-Manoir, Colombes on 27 May 1956, that saw UA Sedan-Torcy defeat AS Troyes Savinienne 3–1 thanks to goals by Diego Cuenca and Pierre Tillon.

== Match details ==
27 May 1956

Sedan	3–1	Troyes-Savinienne
Cuenca 13'; Thuane 34' (o.g.); Tillon 57'		De Vlaeminck 62'

Stade Olympique Yves-du-Manoir, Colombes
Attendance: 47,258
Referee: Maurice Guigue

GK	(France) Pierre Vincent
DF	(France) Daniel Carpentier
DF	(France) Maxime Fulgenzy
DF	(France) Marcel Pascal
DF	(France) Albert Eloy	(c)
MF	(France) Christian Oliver
MF	(France) Claude Brény
MF	(France) Michel Lefevre
MF	(France) Pierre Tillon
FW	(France) Celestin Oliver
FW	(Spain) Diego Cuenca
Manager:
(France) Louis Dugauguez Assistant Referees: Fourth Official:

GK	(France) Pierre Landi
DF	(France) Jean Thuane
DF	(France) François Czapski
DF	(France) Jean Thomas
DF	(France) Jacques Diebold
MF	(Algeria) Said Ferrad
MF	(Denmark) Erik Kuld Jensen
FW	(Sweden) Ake Hjalmarsson
FW	(France) Fernand De Vlaeminck
FW	(France) Bernard Delcampe
FW	(France) Pierre Flamion	(c)
Manager:
(France) Roger Courtois

== See also ==
- 1955–56 Coupe de France
