= 1960–61 French Division 1 =

23rd season of French Division 1

Division Nationale
- Season: 1960–61
- Champions: Monaco (1st title)
- Relegated: Grenoble; Limoges; Valenciennes; Troyes
- European Cup: Monaco
- Cup Winners' Cup: Sedan
- Inter-Cities Fairs Cup: Lyon
- Matches: 380
- Goals: 1,196 (3.15 per match)
- Top goalscorer: Roger Piantoni (28)

AS Monaco won Division 1 season 1960/1961 of the French Association Football League with 57 points.

== Participating teams ==
- Angers SCO
- FC Grenoble
- Le Havre AC
- RC Lens
- Limoges FC
- Olympique Lyonnais
- AS Monaco
- FC Nancy
- OGC Nice
- Nîmes Olympique
- RC Paris
- Stade de Reims
- Stade Rennais UC
- FC Rouen
- AS Saint-Etienne
- UA Sedan-Torcy
- Stade Français FC
- Toulouse FC
- AS Troyes-Savinienne
- US Valenciennes-Anzin
Location of teams in 1960–61 Division 1

== Final table ==
Pos	Team	Pld	W	D	L	GF	GA	GAv	Pts	Qualification or relegation
1	Monaco (C)	38	26	5	7	77	42	1.833	57	Qualification to European Cup preliminary round
2	Racing Paris	38	23	10	5	93	57	1.632	56	
3	Reims	38	23	4	11	78	44	1.773	50	
4	Rouen	38	21	4	13	56	42	1.333	46	
5	Saint-Étienne	38	16	11	11	60	54	1.111	43	
6	Nîmes	38	17	8	13	70	61	1.148	42	
7	Angers	38	16	8	14	64	56	1.143	40	
8	Nancy	38	13	13	12	55	52	1.058	39	
9	Sedan	38	15	8	15	64	63	1.016	38	Qualification to Cup Winners' Cup preliminary round
10	Lens	38	14	9	15	50	54	0.926	37	
11	Le Havre	38	13	10	15	61	62	0.984	36	
12	Toulouse	38	13	10	15	49	58	0.845	36	
13	Nice	38	13	8	17	66	73	0.904	34	
14	Rennes	38	12	10	16	52	59	0.881	34	
15	Lyon	38	13	8	17	60	71	0.845	34	Invited to Inter-Cities Fairs Cup
16	Stade Français	38	12	8	18	52	59	0.881	32	
17	Grenoble (R)	38	8	15	15	47	55	0.855	31	Relegation to French Division 2
18	Limoges (R)	38	11	8	19	55	69	0.797	30	Relegation to French Division 2
19	Valenciennes (R)	38	12	6	20	35	57	0.614	30	Relegation to French Division 2
20	Troyes-Savinienne (R)	38	5	5	28	52	108	0.481	15	Relegation to French Division 2

Rules for classification: 1) points; 2) goal difference; 3) number of goals scored.
(C) Champions; (R) Relegated

Promoted from Division 2, who will play in Division 1 season 1961/1962

- SO Montpellier:Champion of Division 2
- FC Metz:runner-up of Division 2
- FC Sochaux-Montbéliard: Third place
- RC Strasbourg: Fourth place, Inter-Cities Fairs Cup

== Results ==
Home \ Away	ANG	GRE	LHA	RCL	LFC	OL	ASM	FCN	NIC	NMS	RCP	REI	REN	ROU	STE	SED	SFF	TOU	TRO	VAL
Angers		2–2	1–0	3–2	4–0	3–0	1–4	1–2	5–0	4–2	0–3	3–2	1–1	1–3	2–4	0–0	1–0	1–1	5–1	3–1
Grenoble	0–0		0–1	2–1	2–0	2–2	0–0	2–2	3–1	1–2	0–2	3–2	1–1	0–0	1–1	6–3	1–0	4–0	1–0	0–0
Le Havre	0–0	1–1		3–2	2–1	3–2	1–1	1–1	3–2	3–0	2–2	2–1	3–2	0–2	2–1	1–0	0–0	3–0	5–2	0–1
Lens	2–2	1–1	2–1		1–1	0–1	0–1	1–0	1–0	2–1	1–3	2–0	3–1	1–0	1–3	0–0	2–2	3–1	1–0	2–0
Limoges	1–3	1–0	2–1	5–2		3–1	1–5	0–0	4–2	4–1	0–1	0–1	0–0	3–2	1–1	1–2	4–3	1–1	1–0	2–1
Lyon	1–1	1–1	1–3	1–2	2–1		2–0	0–1	4–3	2–2	4–2	0–2	4–0	4–1	2–2	1–1	2–1	1–0	5–2	0–0
Monaco	2–0	1–0	2–2	2–1	3–2	3–1		2–0	5–1	3–0	3–0	2–0	3–0	1–0	3–0	2–0	2–4	3–1	5–0	1–0
Nancy	0–2	1–1	0–0	2–2	0–0	2–1	0–4		3–3	2–2	1–1	2–0	2–0	0–1	2–2	2–1	5–1	1–0	3–2	4–0
Nice	3–2	4–2	3–3	1–0	2–1	2–2	6–0	1–4		0–1	0–1	1–4	3–1	3–0	1–0	3–1	0–0	1–1	1–1	2–0
Nîmes	3–2	2–2	2–1	1–2	3–2	3–0	1–1	3–4	4–1		2–2	2–0	1–0	3–1	0–2	5–0	4–3	3–0	2–0	2–0
Racing Paris	5–3	6–3	4–4	3–2	3–1	3–2	3–0	2–0	4–2	3–2		1–1	0–2	0–1	4–2	2–0	3–1	3–0	3–3	1–1
Reims	1–0	1–0	2–0	1–0	2–2	2–0	3–0	3–0	3–0	5–1	5–3		1–1	3–1	0–1	4–3	2–0	4–2	3–1	4–0
Rennes	2–0	1–0	3–2	4–2	3–2	6–1	1–3	1–0	1–2	0–0	1–1	2–2		0–0	2–2	2–0	0–2	3–2	2–2	1–2
Rouen	1–0	2–0	3–1	6–2	3–1	0–1	2–3	3–1	1–0	2–1	0–3	2–1	1–0		1–0	1–0	0–0	7–0	1–0	3–0
Saint-Étienne	2–2	3–1	2–1	1–0	3–1	4–2	0–1	1–1	0–0	2–1	1–2	3–1	1–3	1–1		0–0	2–0	1–0	7–1	1–0
Sedan	1–2	3–0	2–1	0–0	1–1	2–1	4–1	2–1	4–3	1–3	1–3	0–4	2–1	4–0	2–2		4–0	1–1	4–1	2–1
Stade Français	1–0	1–0	3–1	0–0	0–1	3–1	1–1	0–2	1–3	2–1	3–3	0–1	3–1	0–1	5–0	3–1		1–3	2–1	3–0
Toulouse	3–1	2–1	4–1	0–0	2–1	2–0	3–0	2–2	0–0	0–0	1–1	3–1	2–0	2–0	0–1	0–2	1–0		3–3	2–2
Troyes	1–2	3–3	4–3	1–3	3–2	2–3	0–1	2–1	0–5	0–2	1–4	1–4	2–3	0–2	4–0	3–7	5–3	0–3		0–2
Valenciennes	0–1	1–0	1–0	0–1	3–1	1–2	1–3	2–1	3–1	2–2	1–3	0–2	1–0	2–1	3–1	1–3	0–0	1–2	1–0	

Legend: Blue = home team win; Yellow = draw; Red = away team win.

== Top goalscorers ==
Rank	Player	Club	Goals
1	(France) Roger Piantoni	Reims	28
2	(France) Antoine Keller	Troyes	23
3	(Morocco) Hassan Akesbi	Nîmes	21
3	(France) (Hungary) Joseph Ujlaki	Racing Paris	21
5	(France) (Argentina) Hector De Bourgoing	Nice	20
5	(France) Jacques Faivre	Rennes	20
7	(France) Lucien Cossou	Monaco	18
8	(France) Yvon Douis	Le Havre	17
9	(Algeria) Mohamed Salem	Sedan	16
10	(France) (Argentina) Nestor Combin	Lyon	15
10	(Argentina) Alberto Muro	Nancy	15
10	(France) Jean-Jacques Marcel	Racing Paris	15
10	(Switzerland) Norbert Eschmann	Stade Français	15

== Attendances ==
#	Club	Average
1	Racing	20,734
2	Rouen	11,497
3	Stade français	10,306
4	Saint-Étienne	9,775
5	Stade rennais	9,342
6	Le Havre	9,296
7	Olympique lyonnais	8,615
8	Grenoble	8,490
9	Reims	8,264
10	Nîmes	7,704
11	Nice	7,291
12	Limoges	7,150
13	Lens	7,130
14	Toulouse	7,054
15	Angers	6,710
16	Nancy	6,291
17	Valenciennes	5,743
18	Sedan	5,292
19	ASTS	3,856
20	Monaco	3,814
