= 1962–63 French Division 1 =

25th season of French Division 1

Division Nationale
- Season: 1962–63
- Champions: Monaco (2nd title)
- Relegated: Grenoble; FC Nancy; Montpellier; Marseille
- European Cup: Monaco
- Cup Winners' Cup: Lyon
- Inter-Cities Fairs Cup: Racing Paris
- Matches: 380
- Goals: 1,186 (3.12 per match)
- Top goalscorer: Serge Masnaghetti (35)

AS Monaco won Division 1 season 1962/1963 of the French Association Football League with 50 points.

== Participating teams ==
- Angers SCO
- Bordeaux
- FC Grenoble
- RC Lens
- Olympique Lyonnais
- Olympique de Marseille
- AS Monaco
- SO Montpellier
- FC Nancy
- OGC Nice
- Nîmes Olympique
- RC Paris
- Stade de Reims
- Stade Rennais UC
- FC Rouen
- UA Sedan-Torcy
- Stade Français FC
- RC Strasbourg
- Toulouse FC
- US Valenciennes-Anzin
Location of teams in 1962–63 Division 1

== Final table ==
Pos	Team	Pld	W	D	L	GF	GA	GD	Pts	Qualification or relegation
1	Monaco (C)	38	20	10	8	77	44	+33	50	Qualification to European Cup preliminary round
2	Reims	38	19	9	10	79	52	+27	47	
3	Sedan	38	19	8	11	68	46	+22	46	
4	Bordeaux	38	15	15	8	63	38	+25	45	
5	Lyon	38	15	13	10	52	41	+11	43	Qualification to Cup Winners' Cup first round (Note: Lyon qualified for 1963–64 European Cup Winners' Cup as runners-up of the 1962–63 Coupe de France, as winners Monaco qualified for the European Cup.)
6	Nîmes	38	16	10	12	67	47	+20	42	
7	Toulouse	38	16	10	12	64	52	+12	42	
8	Rouen	38	18	6	14	59	57	+2	42	
9	Valenciennes	38	13	15	10	60	45	+15	41	
10	Racing Paris	38	14	13	11	80	71	+9	41	Invited to Inter-Cities Fairs Cup
11	Rennes	38	14	13	11	69	71	−2	41	
12	Nice	38	14	10	14	64	79	−15	38	
13	Angers	38	13	11	14	51	64	−13	37	
14	Strasbourg	38	9	16	13	54	63	−9	34	
15	Stade Français	38	11	10	17	54	70	−16	32	
16	Lens	38	10	10	18	60	67	−7	30	
17	Grenoble (R)	38	7	14	17	36	61	−25	28	Relegation to French Division 2
18	Nancy (R)	38	9	10	19	37	66	−29	28	Relegation to French Division 2
19	Montpellier (R)	38	9	9	20	50	77	−27	27	Relegation to French Division 2
20	Marseille (R)	38	9	8	21	42	75	−33	26	Relegation to French Division 2

Rules for classification: Victory: 2 points, Draw: 1 point, Defeat: 0 points
(C) Champions; (R) Relegated
Notes:

Promoted from Division 2, who will play in Division 1 season 1963/1964

- AS Saint-Etienne:Champion of Division 2
- FC Nantes:runner-up of Division 2

== Results ==
Home \ Away	ANG	BOR	GRE	RCL	OL	OM	ASM	SOM	FCN	NIC	NIM	RCP	REI	REN	ROU	SED	SFF	RCS	TOU	VAL
Angers		0–3	2–1	2–2	2–2	3–0	4–2	2–1	1–1	3–0	0–0	2–1	0–1	2–3	3–1	0–1	2–0	2–2	1–3	0–0
Bordeaux	0–0		1–1	3–0	1–2	1–3	0–1	2–0	2–0	0–2	0–0	2–1	2–3	6–0	4–1	4–4	1–0	3–0	0–0	2–2
Grenoble	0–2	2–1		1–0	1–2	0–3	0–1	3–1	1–1	3–1	0–0	1–1	0–3	1–1	1–1	1–1	1–1	3–3	1–0	1–1
Lens	3–3	3–3	2–0		2–1	8–1	1–0	3–0	0–1	2–2	2–1	1–2	0–0	2–2	1–4	1–2	2–1	0–0	1–1	1–2
Lyon	3–0	1–0	0–1	1–0		1–1	1–1	1–1	3–0	3–1	0–0	1–1	0–0	1–1	0–1	0–2	1–0	3–1	3–3	1–1
Marseille	1–0	1–1	2–2	3–3	1–2		2–4	3–2	2–1	1–1	0–3	1–3	1–0	4–2	0–1	0–0	3–2	1–3	0–1	1–3
Monaco	5–1	0–2	4–0	2–0	1–0	2–1		3–1	0–1	6–2	4–1	1–1	5–2	5–0	3–1	0–1	1–1	1–0	0–0	3–1
Montpellier	1–2	0–3	2–0	2–1	1–1	2–0	0–1		5–3	1–0	1–1	4–1	3–0	1–1	3–1	1–0	4–5	1–1	1–1	0–4
Nancy	0–0	2–2	1–0	1–3	3–2	1–0	2–1	2–1		1–1	0–4	2–2	0–2	2–2	1–3	2–0	0–0	1–1	1–2	2–0
Nice	1–1	1–1	3–2	3–1	3–5	1–0	2–2	3–1	2–0		1–0	3–3	4–0	3–3	1–0	2–1	0–2	3–1	2–1	2–0
Nîmes	5–0	1–2	1–0	4–2	1–0	3–0	1–2	1–1	3–0	6–3		4–1	0–0	2–1	2–1	1–2	4–0	5–1	3–1	1–3
Racing Paris	2–4	1–3	2–0	2–1	1–1	3–0	2–3	9–1	4–2	3–4	2–2		3–3	2–1	3–0	4–3	0–2	1–1	2–2	3–2
Reims	4–0	1–3	1–1	3–1	5–1	1–0	1–1	1–1	5–1	4–2	4–1	3–2		4–0	4–0	2–3	6–2	1–1	1–0	2–2
Rennes	1–1	1–3	3–0	4–2	2–1	3–2	2–0	3–1	1–1	3–1	1–1	3–5	2–0		0–3	3–1	2–0	4–1	3–1	3–1
Rouen	3–1	1–1	0–2	3–2	0–1	3–0	3–3	3–1	2–1	4–2	0–1	0–2	1–2	2–0		2–1	3–1	0–0	2–2	3–2
Sedan	0–1	1–1	3–1	2–1	1–3	4–0	3–0	2–0	2–0	0–0	3–0	0–0	1–2	3–3	0–1		3–0	2–1	2–1	4–2
Stade Français	0–3	0–0	1–1	2–0	1–0	2–2	2–2	5–2	2–0	2–0	4–2	1–2	0–4	3–3	1–2	4–2		2–1	1–2	1–3
Strasbourg	3–1	0–0	4–0	1–3	0–3	0–0	2–2	1–1	1–0	7–0	2–1	2–2	3–2	1–1	3–0	1–5	1–1		3–1	0–2
Toulouse FC	4–0	0–0	4–2	1–2	0–1	3–1	0–5	2–1	2–0	4–0	2–0	1–1	3–2	2–1	1–2	0–2	5–2	1–1		5–1
Valenciennes	4–0	2–0	1–1	1–1	0–0	0–1	0–0	2–0	2–0	2–2	1–1	4–0	2–0	0–0	1–1	1–1	0–0	4–0	1–2	

Legend: Blue = home team win; Yellow = draw; Red = away team win.

== Top goalscorers ==
Rank	Player	Club	Goals
1	(France) Serge Masnaghetti	Valenciennes	35
2	(France) Lucien Cossou	Monaco	28
3	(Morocco) Hassan Akesbi	Reims	24
4	(France) Aimé Gori	Bordeaux	22
4	(Algeria) Khennane Mahi	Toulouse FC	22
6	(Algeria) Mohamed Salem	Sedan	21
7	(France) (Poland) Antoine Groschulski	Nancy	20
7	(France) (Argentina) Hector De Bourgoing	Nice	20
7	(Algeria) Salah Djebaïli	Nîmes	20
10	(France) Guy Van Sam	Racing Paris	18

== Attendances ==
#	Club	Average
1	Racing	14,867
2	Girondins	14,086
3	Marseille	12,419
4	Stade français	12,404
5	Stade rennais	10,806
6	Olympique lyonnais	10,410
7	Nice	10,242
8	Strasbourg	9,274
9	Toulouse	9,060
10	Reims	8,460
11	Rouen	7,978
12	Lens	7,964
13	Nîmes	7,813
14	MHSC	7,802
15	Valenciennes	7,391
16	Grenoble	6,618
17	Sedan	5,294
18	Angers	5,243
19	Nancy	5,021
20	Monaco	3,557
