= Guy Hatchi =

French footballer (1934–2017)

Personal information
- Full name: Guy Georges Hatchi
- Date of birth: 18 March 1934
- Place of birth: Basse-Terre, Guadeloupe, France
- Date of death: 7 July 2017 (aged 83)
- Place of death: Sarlat-la-Canéda, France
- Height: 1.71 m (5 ft 7 in)
- Position: Midfielder

Senior career*
Years	Team	Apps	(Gls)
1954–1960	Limoges	77+	(16+)
1960–1961	Sedan-Torcy	48	(4)
1961–1965	Lyon	111	(14)
1965–1966	Marseille	30	(4)
1967	Nîmes	17	(0)

International career
1961	France B	1	(0)
- * Club domestic league appearances and goals

Guy Georges Hatchi (18 March 1934 – 7 July 2017) was a French footballer who played as a midfielder.

== Club career ==
Born in Guadeloupe, Hatchi began playing football in Pointe-à-Pitre. In 1954, he left his hometown of Basse-Terre and moved to mainland France, he was given a trial at Championnat de France Amateur side Limoges, who he signed for. In 1960, he joined Sedan-Torcy, where he won the 1960–61 Coupe de France, beating Nîmes Olympique 3–1 in the final. In total, he played 56 matches for Sedan, including 48 in the French Division 1, scoring four goals.

In November 1961, Hatchi joined Olympique Lyonnais, where he reached another two Coupe de France finals, losing to Monaco in 1963, before beating Bordeaux the following year. In 1965, he joined French Division 2 side Marseille, where he played a key role in the club's promotion during the 1965–66 season. Shortly after, he joined Nîmes Olympique, where he later retired.

Following his retirement from football, Hatchi played tennis in Sarlat-la-Canéda.

== International career ==
In 1961, Hatchi made an appearance for the France national B team in a match against Belgium's B team.

== Personal life and death ==
Hatchi was married, and had a daughter. During his career, he was subjected to racist abuse by people who mistook him for being from North Africa, with a journalist even mistakenly labelling him "the Algerian".

He died in Sarlat-la-Canéda on 7 July 2017, at the age of 83, following a heart attack.

== Honours ==
Sedan

- Coupe de France: 1960–61

Lyon

- Coupe de France: 1963–64; runner-up: 1962–63

Marseille

- French Division 2 runner-up: 1965–66
