= Serge Masnaghetti =

French footballer (born 1934)

Personal information
- Date of birth: 15 April 1934 (age 92)
- Place of birth: Mancieulles, France
- Height: 1.72 m (5 ft 8 in)
- Position: Striker

Senior career*
Years	Team	Apps	(Gls)
–1959	AS Giraumont		
1959–1966	Valenciennes-Anzin	188	(111)

International career
1963	France	2	(1)
- * Club domestic league appearances and goals

Serge Masnaghetti (born 15 April 1934) is a French former professional football player. He spent his entire professional career with Valenciennes-Anzin (now known as "Valenciennes FC"), for whom he is the top scorer of all time with 128 goals in all competitions, and also made two appearances for the France national team.

== Club career ==
=== Early career ===
Masnaghetti was born in Mancieulles in Lorraine on 15 April 1934. He began playing football for local amateur side AS Giraumont at the age of fourteen, and quickly made an impact, winning several local titles in a team including three other future France internationals (Bruno Rodzik, Marcel Adamczyk and future Valenciennes-Anzin teammate Jean-Claude Piumi). It was not an easy path into football for Masnaghetti, who worked in the mines in the morning, trained in the afternoon, and played games on the weekend. Despite being sought after by several clubs, his father did not approve of him leaving to pursue football, and Masnaghetti instead enrolled in the army at the age of 20, serving for three years, of which two were spent in Algeria.

=== Valenciennes ===
After his return to France, Masnaghetti was spotted by Valenciennes-Anzin manager Robert Domergue during a friendly match, who persuaded him to sign a professional contract with the then-Division 1 club in 1959, on the condition that the club would find him a job at a nearby mine if his footballing career didn't work out.

Masnaghetti got off to a relatively strong start in Valenciennes, netting 8 times in 21 appearances in all competitions in his first half-season with the club, including a brace against reigning champions Reims. He struggled during the second half of the season, however, missing many chances and eventually being dropped. The following season, in which Valenciennes ended up being relegated, Masnaghetti, a striker by trade, was unsuccessfully tried out as a centre-back.

The club stuck with Masnaghetti in Division 2, and the arrival of Hungarian striker Antoine Keller and centre-back Jean-Claude Piumi prompted Domergue to adopt a 4-2-4 formation with two centre-forwards. This formation change and strike partnership helped unlock Masnaghetti's potential, and he fired home a league-topping 21 league goals to help his side win promotion back to the top flight.

The following season saw Masnaghetti's good form continue, finishing top scorer of Division 1 with 35 goals in 37 appearances, including a 13 game period from 16 December to 21 April in which he netted 17 times, as his side recorded a top-half finish. It was also around this time, however, that he began having health problems, specifically generalised edema, whose misdiagnosis, which saw doctors allow him to continue to play football, caused further heart problems. These health problems caused him to miss four months of football in 1964.

Masnaghetti was largely able to continue playing for the following few years, however, which were some of the best in Valenciennes' history: a Coupe de France semi-final run in 1963–64, followed by third-place league finishes in 1964–65 and 1965–66, the highest in the club's history. He also set a Division 1 record in this time by scoring a hat-trick in 7 minutes against Nice in 1966, a record that was equalised by Sokrat Mojsov in 1971, but only beaten in 2005 by Matt Moussilou.

Masnaghetti's health problems caught up to him again during the 1965 Christmas break, and he ultimately retired from football at the end of the season. He scored a total of 128 goals for Valenciennes-Anzin, including 111 league goals, making him Valenciennes' top goalscorer of all time (as of September 2025), despite only having managed to play seven seasons as a professional footballer, and having started at the age of 25.

== International career ==
Masnaghetti's strong Division 1 form in 1963 earned him two caps in friendly matches for the France national team: a 0–0 away draw with Spain in January, and a 2–1 home less against Belgium, in which he scored his side's only goal.

== Later life ==
Following his playing career, Masnaghetti has continued to live in Valenciennes, working first as a football coach, and later as a taxi driver, following Valenciennes FC all the while. Following the death of Serge Roy on 26 December 2025, 91-year-old Masnaghetti became the oldest living former international footballer for France.

== Honours ==
Valenciennes-Anzin

- Division 2 runner-up: 1961–62

Individual

- Division 2 top scorer: 1961–62
- Division 1 top scorer: 1962–63
- So Foot Top 1000 Best Players of the French First Division: 163rd
