= Claude Brény =

French footballer (born 1932)

Personal information
- Date of birth: 10 January 1932 (age 94)
- Place of birth: Givonne, France
- Height: 1.78 m (5 ft 10 in)
- Position: Forward

Youth career
- CA Lisieux

Senior career*
Years	Team	Apps	(Gls)
1952–1966	Sedan-Torcy	344	(123)

Managerial career
- 1975–1976: Sedan-Mouzon
- 1982–1984: Olympique Charleville
- * Club domestic league appearances and goals

Claude Brény (born 10 January 1932) is a French former footballer who played as a forward.

== Playing career ==
Brény started his youth career at CA Lisieux, before joining Sedan-Torcy after being recommended to Louis Dugauguez, making his debut for the club in September 1952. While at Sedan, he appeared in two Coupe de France finals in 1956 and 1961, and scored in the 1961 final against Nîmes Olympique.

Overall, Brény made 463 appearances for Sedan, scoring 172 goals.

== Managerial career ==
Following his retirement, he worked as a junior coach for Sedan, succeeding Gaëtan Chrétien. He later served as Sedan's manager between 1975 and 1976, before managing Olympique Charleville between 1982 and 1984.

== Personal life ==
Claude's brother Serge and son Jean-Pierre were both footballers, while his grandson Antoine is a guitarist for Amiens-based indie rock band Molly's.

== Honours ==
Sedan

- French Division 2: 1954–55
- Coupe de France: 1955–56, 1960–61; runner-up: 1964–65
- Coupe Charles Drago runner-up: 1954–55, 1962–63

== See also ==
- List of one-club men in association football
