= 1954–55 French Division 1 =

17th season of French Division 1

Division Nationale
- Season: 1954–55
- Champions: Reims
- Relegated: CO Roubaix-Tourcoing
- European Cup: Reims

Stade de Reims won Division 1 season 1954/1955 of the French Association Football League with 44 points.

== Participating teams ==
- Bordeaux
- RC Lens
- Lille OSC
- Olympique Lyonnais
- Olympique de Marseille
- FC Metz
- AS Monaco
- FC Nancy
- OGC Nice
- Nîmes Olympique
- RC Paris
- Stade de Reims
- CO Roubaix-Tourcoing
- AS Saint-Etienne
- FC Sochaux-Montbéliard
- RC Strasbourg
- Toulouse FC
- AS Troyes-Savinienne
Location of teams in 1954–55 Division 1

== Final table ==
Pos	Team	Pld	W	D	L	GF	GA	GAv	Pts	Qualification or relegation
1	Reims (C)	34	19	6	9	78	53	1.472	44	Qualification to European Cup first round
2	Toulouse	34	15	10	9	57	45	1.267	40	
3	Lens	34	13	12	9	56	55	1.018	38	
4	Strasbourg	34	15	7	12	74	55	1.345	37	
5	Sochaux	34	15	6	13	64	53	1.208	36	
6	Bordeaux	34	14	7	13	63	51	1.235	35	
7	Saint-Étienne	34	15	5	14	58	51	1.137	35	
8	Racing Paris	34	13	8	13	62	57	1.088	34	
9	Nice	34	13	8	13	75	81	0.926	34	
10	Marseille	34	13	7	14	58	51	1.137	33	
11	Nîmes	34	14	5	15	48	52	0.923	33	
12	Lyon	34	12	9	13	54	63	0.857	33	
13	Nancy	34	12	8	14	59	54	1.093	32	
14	Monaco	34	10	11	13	43	45	0.956	31	
15	Metz	34	12	7	15	42	72	0.583	31	
16	Lille (O)	34	11	8	15	61	58	1.052	30	Qualification to relegation play-offs
17	Troyes-Savinienne	34	12	6	16	48	66	0.727	30	Spared from relegation (Note: Troyes-Savinienne were spared from relegation since Red Star, who were initially promoted from Division 2, were involved in a scandal and subsequently were refused promotion.)
18	Roubaix-Tourcoing (R)	34	10	6	18	52	90	0.578	26	Relegation to French Division 2

Rules for classification: Victory: 2 points, Draw: 1 point, Defeat: 0 points
(C) Champions; (O) Play-off winners; (R) Relegated
Notes:

Promoted from Division 2, who will play in Division 1 season 1955/1956

- UA Sedan-Torcy:Champion of Division 2

== Results ==
Home \ Away	BOR	RCL	LIL	OL	OM	MET	ASM	FCN	NIC	NMS	RCP	REI	CRT	STE	SOC	RCS	TOU	TRO
Bordeaux		2–1	4–2	3–1	2–1	2–0	4–1	2–3	7–2	3–1	0–0	5–0	5–1	2–1	1–2	0–1	1–1	3–1
Lens	1–3		2–1	1–0	1–0	2–3	2–0	1–1	2–2	3–1	3–1	0–0	4–3	2–1	6–2	2–1	1–1	2–0
Lille	2–2	3–3		3–1	2–1	4–2	3–1	2–5	1–3	6–1	6–0	3–2	4–0	0–1	0–0	0–0	1–1	1–2
Lyon	3–1	1–1	2–1		3–0	4–2	0–2	2–1	3–4	2–2	2–2	1–1	4–2	1–1	3–2	2–1	3–2	1–0
Marseille	3–1	4–0	5–1	1–0		1–1	1–1	2–2	2–0	0–1	3–1	1–3	5–2	4–0	3–0	2–0	4–0	3–0
Metz	1–0	1–1	0–0	1–2	2–1		2–1	0–0	4–0	1–0	1–4	1–0	0–0	0–2	1–0	3–3	1–5	4–2
Monaco	1–0	6–0	1–1	0–0	1–2	5–0		0–2	1–1	1–0	1–1	1–2	1–0	2–0	0–0	4–0	1–1	1–2
Nancy	1–1	1–3	1–0	0–1	3–0	7–0	0–0		4–1	3–1	1–0	2–4	4–0	2–1	2–2	1–5	0–1	4–1
Nice	1–1	1–2	2–1	7–3	0–0	2–3	1–1	2–2		1–0	3–2	3–3	5–2	2–0	4–0	2–1	5–0	5–1
Nîmes	2–0	1–0	0–1	2–2	2–2	2–0	2–0	1–0	6–2		2–0	0–2	3–0	1–0	2–1	2–1	0–0	1–0
Racing Paris	2–0	1–1	1–3	5–0	3–3	4–0	1–2	0–0	3–1	1–0		2–5	2–2	4–0	0–3	4–2	2–0	4–1
Reims	3–0	4–2	4–2	3–1	2–0	6–0	3–1	5–2	3–2	4–1	0–3		0–2	2–4	3–1	1–2	2–1	3–0
Roubaix-Tourcoing	3–0	2–2	3–1	2–1	1–1	0–2	0–1	2–1	4–2	1–5	3–3	2–1		1–4	2–0	1–0	2–2	1–6
Saint-Étienne	3–1	1–1	2–2	4–2	3–0	2–0	0–0	2–0	4–2	4–2	0–1	0–2	5–1		3–1	5–1	2–3	0–2
Sochaux	3–2	1–1	1–2	2–0	4–0	1–0	5–2	3–2	4–1	6–2	3–2	4–1	5–0	0–0		1–2	1–0	0–0
Strasbourg	1–1	2–2	2–1	1–1	4–1	3–3	5–0	4–0	7–1	3–2	3–1	1–1	3–0	5–0	2–5		2–0	4–0
Toulouse FC	1–1	2–0	2–1	1–0	1–0	6–2	3–2	3–1	1–1	2–0	0–1	1–1	6–2	2–0	2–1	4–1		1–1
Troyes-Savinienne	1–3	2–1	1–0	2–2	4–2	0–1	1–1	2–1	3–4	0–0	3–1	2–2	2–5	0–3	2–0	2–1	2–1	

Legend: Blue = home team win; Yellow = draw; Red = away team win.

== Relegation play-offs ==
Team 1	Agg.	Team 2	1st leg	2nd leg
Lille	7–1	Rennes	1–0	6–1

== Top goalscorers ==
Rank	Player	Club	Goals
1	(France) René Bliard	Reims	30
2	(Austria) Ernst Stojaspal	Strasbourg	23
3	(Sweden) Gunnar Andersson	Marseille	21
4	(France) Just Fontaine	Nice	20
5	(France) (Poland) Édouard Kargu	Bordeaux	17
5	(France) Ginès Liron	Nîmes	17
5	(France) Jacques Foix	Saint-Étienne	17
5	(France) Pierre Flamion	Troyes	17
9	(France) Abdesselem Ben Mohamed	Bordeaux	15
9	(France) Jean Vincent	Lille	15

== Attendances ==
#	Club	Average
1	Marseille	20,455
2	Racing	19,060
3	Strasbourg	14,707
4	Olympique lyonnais	14,214
5	Girondins	13,664
6	Toulouse	12,062
7	LOSC	11,828
8	Nice	11,828
9	Saint-Étienne	11,448
10	Lens	9,272
11	Nîmes	8,672
12	Reims	7,926
13	Metz	7,288
14	Nancy	7,148
15	Roubaix-Tourcoing	6,952
16	ASTS	6,908
17	Sochaux	6,685
18	Monaco	3,871
