= 1953–54 French Division 1 =

16th season of French Division 1

Division Nationale
- Season: 1953–54

Lille OSC won Division 1 season 1953–1954 of the French Association Football League with 47 points.

== Participating teams ==
- Girondins de Bordeaux
- Le Havre AC
- RC Lens
- Lille OSC
- Olympique de Marseille
- FC Metz
- AS Monaco
- FC Nancy
- OGC Nice
- Nîmes Olympique
- Stade de Reims
- CO Roubaix-Tourcoing
- AS Saint-Etienne
- FC Sète
- FC Sochaux-Montbéliard
- Stade Français (Football)
- RC Strasbourg
- Toulouse FC (1937)
Location of teams in 1953–54 Division 1

== Final table ==
Pos	Team	Pld	W	D	L	GF	GA	GAv	Pts	Qualification or relegation
1	Lille (C)	34	17	13	4	49	22	2.227	47	
2	Reims	34	18	10	6	62	36	1.722	46	
3	Bordeaux	34	20	6	8	69	44	1.568	46	
4	Toulouse	34	15	14	5	55	39	1.410	44	
5	Saint-Étienne	34	16	6	12	48	47	1.021	38	
6	Strasbourg	34	15	6	13	60	61	0.984	36	
7	Lens	34	13	9	12	58	56	1.036	35	
8	Nice	34	12	10	12	73	59	1.237	34	
9	Nîmes	34	14	5	15	49	46	1.065	33	
10	Monaco	34	11	9	14	44	48	0.917	31	
11	Sochaux	34	9	12	13	55	57	0.965	30	
12	Metz	34	10	10	14	45	59	0.763	30	
13	Nancy	34	12	6	16	50	65	0.769	30	
14	Marseille	34	10	9	15	49	56	0.875	29	
15	Roubaix-Tourcoing	34	11	6	17	47	65	0.723	28	
16	Stade Français (R)	34	8	11	15	44	49	0.898	27	Qualification to relegation play-offs
17	Le Havre (R)	34	10	6	18	53	69	0.768	26	Relegation to French Division 2
18	Sète (R)	34	6	10	18	38	70	0.543	22	Relegation to French Division 2

Rules for classification: Victory: 2 points, Draw: 1 point, Defeat: 0 points
(C) Champions; (R) Relegated

Promoted from Division 2, who will play in Division 1 season 1954/1955

- Olympique Lyonnais: Champion of Division 2
- AS Troyes-Savinienne: Runner-up
- RC Paris: Third place

== Results ==
Home \ Away	BOR	LHA	RCL	LIL	OM	MET	ASM	FCN	NIC	NMS	REI	CRT	STE	SÉT	SOC	SFF	RCS	TOU
Bordeaux		1–4	1–2	1–3	3–0	3–0	4–3	1–0	4–1	2–1	0–0	5–0	1–0	1–0	7–1	3–2	5–2	0–0
Le Havre	2–3		1–2	1–1	1–0	3–1	1–2	2–2	2–2	0–1	0–0	3–1	2–0	10–0	2–1	1–3	1–2	1–1
Lens	1–1	3–1		0–2	4–1	4–0	0–0	3–2	2–3	4–1	0–0	4–1	2–0	2–2	2–0	1–2	3–1	1–1
Lille	1–0	2–1	1–0		4–0	2–2	0–0	3–0	3–1	0–0	0–1	2–0	1–0	3–1	0–0	1–1	3–0	1–0
Marseille	3–2	5–1	2–0	1–1		1–1	5–1	0–1	0–0	0–4	0–2	3–2	3–1	2–0	0–0	3–1	5–1	0–1
Metz	2–2	2–1	1–1	2–2	3–2		1–0	2–4	0–0	2–0	0–1	4–2	5–1	1–0	1–1	1–0	2–1	2–2
Monaco	1–2	4–1	0–1	0–1	1–1	2–0		2–0	0–3	2–0	2–1	0–2	1–1	2–1	0–0	1–4	4–2	2–3
Nancy	2–2	3–0	3–1	1–1	2–1	2–1	1–1		1–5	4–2	1–0	2–1	0–1	3–1	2–3	0–0	0–0	4–2
Nice	3–4	4–0	6–1	3–0	2–4	0–1	1–2	2–1		1–1	1–1	3–1	5–2	5–0	4–1	1–1	4–3	0–2
Nîmes	2–0	2–0	3–1	1–1	2–1	2–1	1–3	1–0	1–1		1–1	1–0	1–0	5–2	4–1	1–0	1–2	0–1
Reims	1–2	4–2	0–0	0–3	6–0	3–1	2–1	4–1	4–3	2–1		2–2	0–1	2–0	4–1	1–3	2–2	1–1
Roubaix-Tourcoing	0–2	3–1	0–4	0–3	1–0	3–0	2–0	4–2	3–2	4–2	2–2		0–1	1–0	1–1	1–1	0–0	4–1
Saint-Étienne	2–0	0–1	5–2	0–0	0–0	3–2	1–1	3–1	2–1	2–1	0–1	2–1		6–3	2–4	2–1	1–0	1–1
Sète	0–2	4–4	3–1	0–1	2–1	4–1	1–1	1–0	1–1	2–1	0–2	4–0	1–2		0–0	0–0	0–0	1–1
Sochaux	1–1	0–1	1–1	2–2	1–1	3–0	1–0	7–1	4–1	2–1	1–3	0–1	1–2	2–2		4–0	7–1	1–3
Stade Français	0–1	1–2	5–2	0–0	1–1	2–1	0–4	4–0	1–1	1–3	1–2	1–1	1–2	2–2	4–1		0–1	0–0
Strasbourg	1–2	4–0	5–2	2–1	2–1	2–2	3–0	1–2	2–2	2–1	2–4	4–2	2–1	4–0	1–0	2–0		2–0
Toulouse FC	3–1	5–1	1–1	1–0	2–2	0–0	1–1	3–2	4–1	1–0	1–3	3–1	1–1	2–0	2–2	2–1	3–1	

Legend: Blue = home team win; Yellow = draw; Red = away team win.

== Relegation play-offs ==
Team 1	Agg.	Team 2	1st leg	2nd leg
Racing Paris	4–3	Stade Français	2–1	2–2

== Top goalscorers ==
Rank	Player	Club	Goals
1	(France) (Poland) Édouard Kargu	Bordeaux	27
2	(Netherlands) Bram Appel	Reims	23
3	(Sweden) Gunnar Andersson	Marseille	19
4	(France) Robert Bahl	Roubaix-Tourcoing	18
5	(France) Julien Stopyra	Lens	17
5	(France) Just Fontaine	Nice	17
5	(France) (Hungary) Joseph Ujlaki	Nice	17
8	(France) Abdesselem Ben Mohamed	Bordeaux	14
8	(France) Jean Grumellon	Le Havre	14
8	(France) (Poland) Henri Skiba	Monaco	14

== Attendances ==
#	Club	Average
1	Marseille	16,792
2	Girondins	16,407
3	Stade français	13,733
4	LOSC	12,611
5	Nice	12,611
6	Strasbourg	12,326
7	Toulouse	11,574
8	Lens	11,329
9	Saint-Étienne	9,846
10	Nîmes	8,573
11	Reims	8,516
12	Le Havre	7,999
13	Nancy	7,747
14	Roubaix-Tourcoing	7,272
15	Metz	7,014
16	Sochaux	5,849
17	Monaco	4,694
18	Sète	3,802
