= Diego Cuenca =

Spanish footballer (1927–2012)

Personal information
- Date of birth: 4 December 1927
- Place of birth: Barcelona, Spain
- Date of death: 1 January 2012 (aged 84)
- Height: 1.74 m (5 ft 9 in)
- Position: Left winger

Senior career*
Years	Team	Apps	(Gls)
1953–1957	Sedan-Torcy	106	(41)
1957–1959	Forbach	45	(13)
1959	Perpignan	16	(3)
Total		167	(57)
- * Club domestic league appearances and goals

Diego Cuenca (4 December 1927 – 1 January 2012) was a Spanish professional footballer who played as a left winger.

== Honours ==
Sedan-Torcy

- Division 2: 1954–55
- Coupe de France: 1955–56
- Challenge des Champions: 1956
- Coupe Charles Drago runner-up: 1955
