= Thadée Polak =

French footballer (1932–2024)

Personal information
- Date of birth: 2 June 1932
- Place of birth: Montceau-les-Mines, France
- Date of death: 23 September 2024 (aged 92)
- Height: 1.80 m (5 ft 11 in)
- Position: Centre-back

Senior career*
Years	Team	Apps	(Gls)
1952–1956	Lens	123	(0)
1957–1958	Le Havre	45	(3)
1958–1961	Sedan	132	(5)
1961–1967	Lyon	195	(3)
Total		495	(11)
- * Club domestic league appearances and goals

Thadée Polak (2 June 1932 – 23 September 2024) was a French footballer who played as a centre-back. His career spanned from 1952 to 1967 and he primarily played for Sedan and Lyon. He won the Coupe de France twice, in 1961 with Sedan and in 1964 with Lyon. Polak died on 23 September 2024, at the age of 92.

== Honours ==
Sedan

- Coupe de France: 1960–61

Lyon

- Coupe de France: 1963–64
