= Daniel Charles-Alfred =

French footballer (1934–2020)

Personal information
- Date of birth: 9 May 1934
- Place of birth: Fort-de-France, Martinique
- Date of death: 17 September 2020 (aged 86)
- Height: 1.77 m (5 ft 9 1/2 in)
- Position: Defender

Senior career*
Years	Team	Apps	(Gls)
1954–1958	Golden Star		
1958–1968	Nîmes Olympique		
1968–1969	Montpellier HSC		
1969–1970	AC Arles-Avignon		

International career
?–?	France U21		
?–?	France B		
1954–1958	Martinique		
1964	France	4	(0)
- * Club domestic league appearances and goals

Daniel Charles-Alfred (9 May 1934 – 17 September 2020) was a French footballer from Martinique. He played defender during the 1950s and 60s. He appeared on the cover of France Football magazine in 1963.

== Awards ==
- Selection for France national team in 1964
- Finalist in the 1960–61 Coupe de France with Nîmes Olympique
