= Marcel Artelesa =

French footballer (1938-2016)

Personal information
- Date of birth: 2 July 1938
- Place of birth: Pont-Sainte-Marie, Aube, France
- Date of death: 23 September 2016 (aged 78)
- Place of death: Mergey, Aube, France
- Height: 1.73 m (5 ft 8 in)
- Position: Defender

Youth career
- Troyes

Senior career*
| Years | Team | Apps | (Gls) |
| 1959–1961 | AS Troyes-Savinienne | 34 | (0) |
| 1961–1966 | Monaco | 172 | (5) |
| 1966–1968 | Marseille | 75 | (0) |
| 1968–1969 | Nice | 17 | (0) |
| 1969–1970 | CA Paris-Neuilly | 30 | (0) |
| 1970–1973 | AS Troyes-Savinienne | 95 | (1) |

International career
| 1963–1966 | France | 21 | (1) |
- * Club domestic league appearances and goals

Marcel Artelesa (2 July 1938 – 23 September 2016) was a French footballer who played as a defender. He played for France at the 1960 Summer Olympics, and in the 1966 FIFA World Cup in England.

== Honours ==
AS Monaco

- French championship: 1963
- Coupe de France: 1963

== Bibliography ==
- Profile on French federation official site
- Marcel Artelesa at L'Équipe Football (in French)
- Profile
