= 1938–39 French Division 1 =

7th season of French Division 1

Division Nationale
- Season: 1938–39
- Champions: FC Sète; 2nd title
- Relegated: Antibes; Roubaix
- Matches: 240
- Goals: 766 (3.19 per match)
- Top goalscorer: Roger Courtois (27); Désiré Koranyi (27)

FC Sète won Division 1 season 1938/1939, the last professional football season before World War II, of the French Association Football League.

== Participating teams ==
- FC Antibes
- AS Cannes
- SC Fives
- Le Havre AC
- RC Lens
- Olympique Lillois
- Olympique de Marseille
- FC Metz
- RC Paris
- Excelsior AC Roubaix
- RC Roubaix
- FC Rouen
- AS Saint-Étienne
- FC Sète
- FC Sochaux-Montbéliard
- RC Strasbourg
Location of teams in 1938–39 Division 1

== Final table ==
Pos	Team	Pld	W	D	L	GF	GA	GAv	Pts	Qualification or relegation
1	Sète (C)	30	19	4	7	65	36	1.806	42	
2	Marseille	30	18	4	8	56	34	1.647	40	
3	Racing Paris	30	15	8	7	58	43	1.349	38	
4	Saint-Étienne	30	14	7	9	46	30	1.533	35	
5	Lillois (Note: During World War II, Lillois and Fives merged to form Lille OSC, which took both the clubs' place in Division 1 after the war ended.)	30	14	6	10	42	38	1.105	34	
6	Sochaux	30	14	4	12	65	39	1.667	32	
7	Lens	30	11	9	10	51	42	1.214	31	
8	Metz	30	12	7	11	49	46	1.065	31	
9	Fives	30	13	5	12	57	54	1.056	31	
10	Strasbourg	30	10	8	12	39	43	0.907	28	
11	Le Havre	30	11	6	13	48	59	0.814	28	
12	Cannes	30	11	5	14	47	62	0.758	27	
13	Excelsior (Note: During World War II, Excelsior and Roubaix merged into CO Roubaix-Tourcoing, which took Excelsior's place in Division 1 after the war ended.)	30	8	8	14	60	71	0.845	24	
14	Rouen	30	6	9	15	31	48	0.646	21	
15	Antibes (R)	30	6	9	15	21	54	0.389	21	Relegation to French Division 2
16	Roubaix	30	4	9	17	31	67	0.463	17	Merged into Roubaix-Tourcoing

Source: gallica.bnf.fr
Rules for classification: Victory: 2 points, Draw: 1 point, Defeat: 0 points
(C) Champions; (R) Relegated
Notes:

Promoted from Division 2, who would play in Division 1 season 1945/1946 (With the beginning of World War II, relegations and promotions are only taken into account after the end of the war i.e. for season 1945/1946)

- Red Star Olympique: Champion of Division 2
- Stade Rennais UC: Runner-up Division 2

== Results ==
Home \ Away	FCA	CAN	EAR	SCF	LHA	RCL	LIL	OM	MET	RCP	RCR	ROU	STE	SÉT	SOC	RCS
Antibes		0–0	3–0	0–3	1–0	1–0	0–3	2–2	1–1	1–1	1–0	0–0	0–4	0–2	0–0	1–1
Cannes	3–0		2–1	1–5	3–2	2–1	1–2	2–4	2–1	1–2	4–1	2–0	1–2	3–2	0–0	1–1
Excelsior Roubaix	0–2	3–5		3–1	3–3	0–1	1–1	1–2	3–1	6–2	4–2	1–1	1–0	2–3	3–2	6–1
Fives	4–1	3–1	4–2		7–3	0–4	3–1	0–0	1–1	0–1	1–3	1–0	3–2	1–3	2–4	2–0
Le Havre	2–0	3–0	1–3	0–0		2–2	1–0	2–0	0–3	2–1	5–2	1–1	0–0	2–1	2–1	2–1
Lens	1–1	6–2	2–2	4–2	3–1		2–3	2–1	1–1	3–1	0–2	1–0	1–2	2–2	1–1	1–1
Olympique Lillois	2–0	4–3	1–2	1–0	2–0	0–1		3–2	0–2	2–1	5–3	3–1	1–0	2–0	0–1	0–1
Marseille	5–2	0–1	4–2	2–0	0–2	2–0	2–0		5–1	5–2	6–0	1–0	3–1	1–1	1–0	1–0
Metz	6–0	2–1	1–1	1–3	2–1	1–1	0–1	5–1		3–0	1–0	2–2	1–0	0–2	0–3	2–1
Racing Paris	3–0	5–1	3–1	2–2	3–0	1–0	2–2	1–1	3–2		1–1	3–0	1–1	3–0	6–1	3–2
Racing Roubaix	2–2	1–1	1–1	3–3	1–1	1–5	0–0	1–0	1–2	0–3		1–2	2–2	1–0	1–4	2–0
Rouen	0–1	2–1	2–2	1–3	1–4	3–0	0–0	1–2	2–2	3–1	0–0		0–2	0–1	1–0	1–1
Saint-Étienne	1–0	2–0	2–2	2–0	4–2	1–1	2–0	1–0	0–1	0–1	5–0	2–1		3–1	2–1	0–0
Sète	4–0	3–0	2–0	3–2	2–2	2–2	1–2	6–3	5–0	3–1	2–0	2–1	2–1		2–0	2–0
Sochaux	2–0	7–3	8–0	5–2	8–0	0–2	4–1	2–0	0–1	1–0	3–1	2–0	1–2	1–1		2–0
Strasbourg	2–1	1–3	3–1	3–1	3–1	3–2	1–2	1–0	0–0	1–1	2–0	5–1	1–1	1–3	2–0	

Legend: Blue = home team win; Yellow = draw; Red = away team win.

== Top goalscorers ==
Rank	Player	Club	Goals
1	(France) (Switzerland) Roger Courtois	Sochaux	27
1	(France) (Hungary) Désiré Koranyi	Sète	27
3	(France) Norbert Van Caeneghem	Fives	24
4	(France) (Austria) Henri Hiltl	Excelsior Roubaix	18
5	(France) Emmanuel Aznar	Marseille	16
5	(France) Antoine Franceschetti	Cannes	16
5	(Switzerland) Alessandro Frigerio	Le Havre	16
5	(France) (Austria) Ignace Tax	Saint-Étienne	16
