= Stade Louis Dugauguez =

Stadium in Sedan, France

Coordinates: 49°41′39″N 4°56′20″E

Stade Louis-Dugauguez
- Duguau
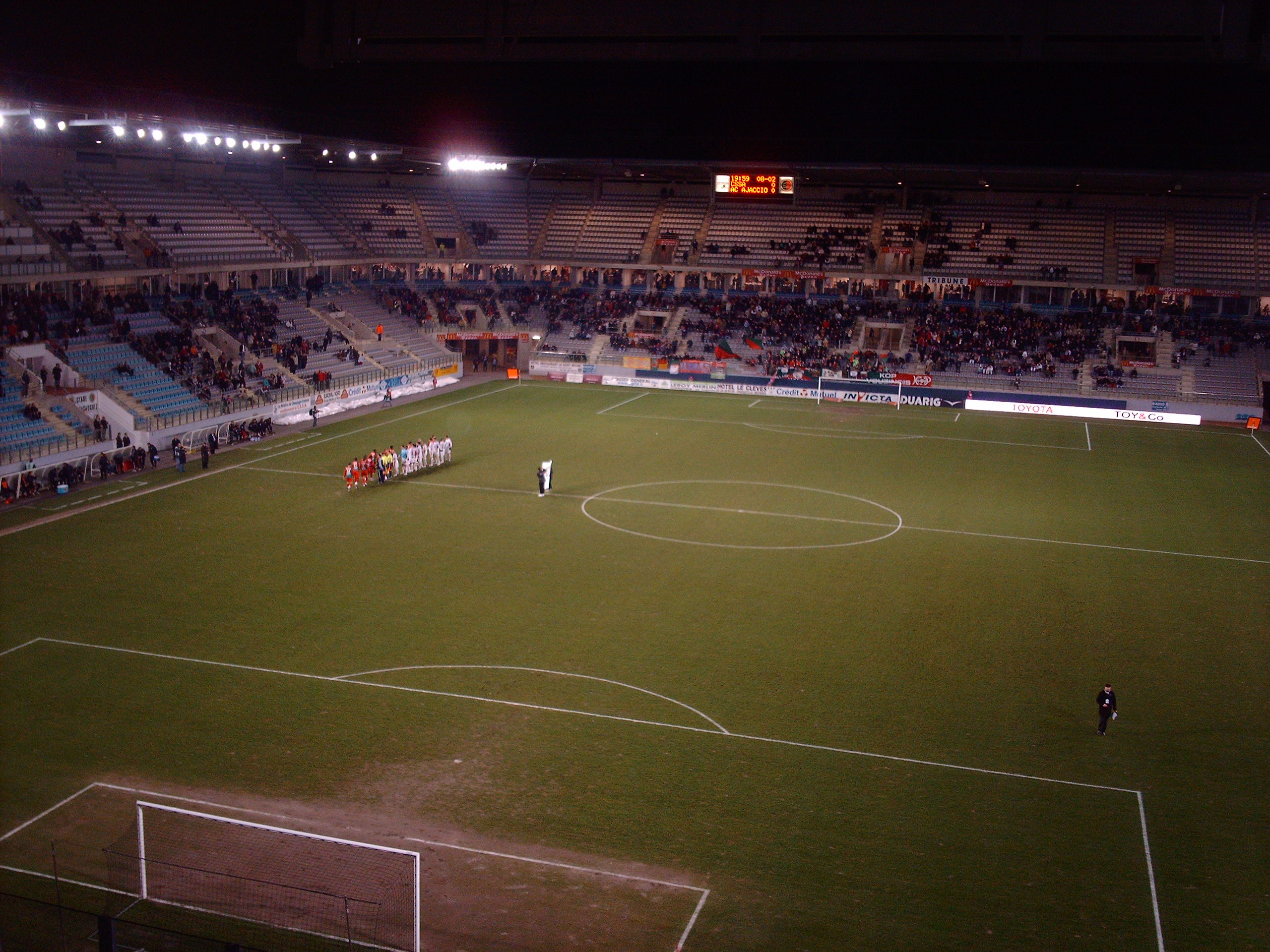
- Interactive map of Stade Louis-Dugauguez
- Location: Boulevard de Lattre de Tassigny; 08200 Sedan
- Owner: Ville de Sedan
- Capacity: 23,189
- Surface: Grass
- Field size: 105 m x 68 m

Construction
- Built: January 3, 2000
- Opened: October 7, 2000
- Expanded: 2001
- Cost: €15.8 million
- Architects: Jean-Claude Paulin, Christophe Mariotti

Tenant
- Club Sportif Sedan Ardennes (2000-)

Stade Louis Dugauguez is a multi-use stadium in Sedan, France. It is currently used mostly for football matches and is the home stadium of CS Sedan Ardennes. The stadium holds 23,189 people and was built in 2000. It replaced Stade Emile Albeau. It is named after the former French footballer and manager Louis Dugauguez (1918–1991).
