= Erik Kuld Jensen =

Danish footballer (1925–2004)

Personal information
- Date of birth: 10 June 1925
- Place of birth: Aarhus, Denmark
- Date of death: 14 April 2004 (aged 78)
- Height: 1.76 m (5 ft 9 in)
- Position: Forward

Youth career
- 1935–: AGF

Senior career*
| Years | Team | Apps | (Gls) |
| –1950 | AGF | | |
| 1950–1953 | Lille | 83 | (24) |
| 1953–1955 | Lyon | 64 | (21) |
| 1955–1956 | Troyes-Savinienne | 40 | (10) |
| 1956–1958 | Marseille | 42 | (9) |
| 1958–1959 | Aix | 28 | (2) |

International career
| 1947–1950 | Denmark U21 | 6 | (5) |
| 1947–1950 | Denmark | 4 | (1) |

Managerial career
- 1960–1961: Frederikshavn fI
- 1967–1968: AGF
Medal record
Men's football
Representing Denmark
Olympic Games
| Bronze medal – third place | 1948 London | Team |
- * Club domestic league appearances and goals

Erik Kuld Jensen (10 June 1925 – 14 April 2004) was a Danish football player and football manager. A forward, he was a part of Denmark's squad for the football tournament at the 1948 Summer Olympics, but he did not play in any matches. He played four matches for the Denmark national team.

He came in second in the Danish Championship with Aarhus GF in 1945, and third in 1948 and 1949. In 1950 he joined French club Lille. Here he came in second in his first season behind Nice. In 1953 he won the Coupe de France with Lille.

In 1956 he reached the final of the French cup again, this time with Troyes.

Later he become the coach of newly promoted Frederikshavn fI Here he came in 5th in his first season and 8th in his second in the Danish 1. Division.

In 1967 he took over his former club Aarhus GF, but he was relegated in his first season with 6 rounds to go following a 9–0 loss to KB, the biggest defeat in the history of the club. Three days after he was fired and replaced by Kaj Christensen.
