= Roger Courtois =

French footballer (1912–1972)

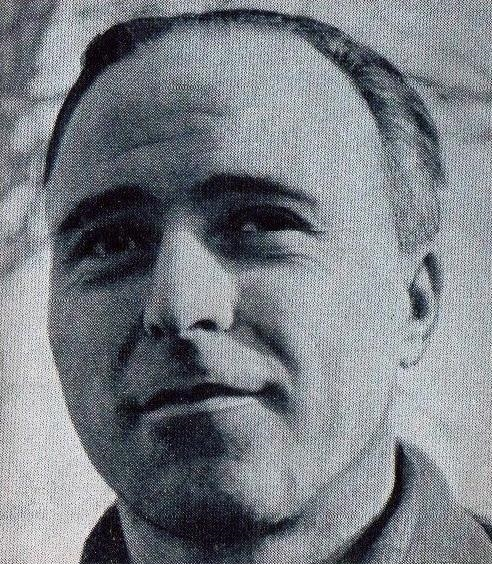
- Courtois in 1958

Personal information
- Date of birth: 30 May 1912
- Place of birth: Geneva, Switzerland
- Date of death: 5 May 1972 (aged 59)
- Height: 1.60 m (5 ft 3 in)
- Position: Striker

Youth career
- Urania Genève Sport

Senior career*
Years	Team	Apps	(Gls)
1932–1933	Urania Genève Sport	12	(10)
1933–1939	Sochaux	152	(151)
1941–1945	Lausanne-Sport	91	(45)
1945–1952	Sochaux	177	(87)
1952–1958	AS Troyes-Savinienne	16	(4)
Total		448	(297)

International career
1933–1947	France	22	(10)

Managerial career
- 1952–1963: AS Troyes-Savinienne
- 1963–1965: Monaco
- * Club domestic league appearances and goals

Roger Courtois (French pronunciation: [ʁɔʒe kuʁtwa]; 30 May 1912 – 5 May 1972) was a French football player and manager. He played as a striker.

== International career ==
Born in Switzerland to French parents, Courtois represented the France national team at the FIFA World Cup 1934 and 1938.

== Career statistics ==
=== Club ===
Appearances and goals by club, season and competition
Club	Season	League			Cup		Total	
Club	Season	Division	Apps	Goals	Apps	Goals	Apps	Goals
Urania Genève Sport	1931–32	Nationalliga						
Urania Genève Sport	1932–33	Nationalliga	12	10	3	7	15	17
Urania Genève Sport	Total		12	10	3	7	12	10
Sochaux	1933–34	Division 1	24	23	2	2	26	25
Sochaux	1934–35	Division 1	27	29	4	6	31	35
Sochaux	1935–36	Division 1	28	34	7	11	35	45
Sochaux	1936–37	Division 1	19	16	5	9	24	25
Sochaux	1937–38	Division 1	26	22	1	0	27	22
Sochaux	1938–39	Division 1	23	27	3	1	26	28
Sochaux	1939–40	Division 1	0	0	5	4	5	4
Sochaux	Total		147	151	27	33	174	184
Lausanne-Sport	1941–42	Nationalliga	24	12	3	4	24	12
Lausanne-Sport	1942–43	Nationalliga	25	13	1	1	25	13
Lausanne-Sport	1943–44	Nationalliga	20	8	5	1	20	8
Lausanne-Sport	1944–45	Nationalliga	22	12	3	6	22	12
Lausanne-Sport	Total		91	45	12	12	91	45
Sochaux	1945–46	Division 1	27	17	3	1	30	18
Sochaux	1946–47	Division 2	39	29	4	5	43	34
Sochaux	1947–48	Division 1	28	12	4	3	32	15
Sochaux	1948–49	Division 1	26	9	1	0	27	9
Sochaux	1949–50	Division 1	27	11	3	2	30	13
Sochaux	1950–51	Division 1	26	9	2	0	28	9
Sochaux	1951–52	Division 1	4	0	3	0	4	0
Sochaux	Total		177	87	18	11	177	87
Troyes-Savinienne	1953–54	Division 2	8	3	1	2	9	5
Troyes-Savinienne	1954–55	Division 1						
Troyes-Savinienne	1955–56	Division 1	3	1			3	1
Troyes-Savinienne	1956–57	Division 2	4	0			4	0
Troyes-Savinienne	1957–58	Division 2	1	0			1	0
Troyes-Savinienne	Total		16	4			16	4
Career total			448	297	61	65	509	362

=== International ===
Appearances and goals by national team and year
National team	Year	Apps	Goals
France	1933	1	0
France	1934	1	1
France	1935	6	4
France	1936	4	3
France	1937	5	1
France	1938	2	1
France	1939	1	0
France	1940	1	0
France	1947	1	0
Total		22	10

== Honours ==
Sochaux-Montbéliard

- Division 1: 1935, 1938
- Coupe de France: 1937
- Division 2: 1947
- Division 1 top goalscorer: 1936, 1939

Lausanne-Sport

- Swiss Super League: 1944
- Swiss Cup: 1944
