= Pierre Flamion =

French footballer (1924–2004)

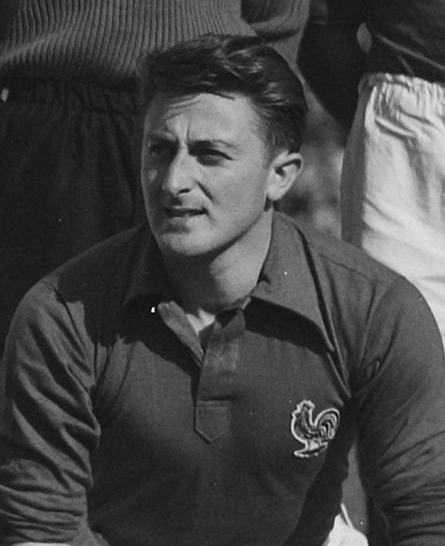
- Flamion in 1949

Personal information
- Full name: Pierre Émile Flamion
- Date of birth: 13 December 1924
- Place of birth: Mohon, Morbihan, France
- Date of death: 3 January 2004 (aged 79)
- Place of death: Dijon, France
- Position: Forward

Youth career
- ASC Mohon

Senior career*
Years	Team	Apps	(Gls)
1944–1950	Reims	152	(65)
1950–1951	Marseille	29	(11)
1951–1954	Lyon	32	(5)
1954–1957	AS Troyes-Savinienne	158	(66)
1957–1958	Limoges FC	33	(4)
Total		404	(151)

International career
1948–1953	France	17	(8)

Managerial career
- 1957–1962: Limoges FC
- 1962–1968: FC Chaumont
- 1968–1970: Metz
- 1971–1975: AS Troyes-Savinienne
- 1975–1978: Reims
- 1979–1981: FC Thionville
- 1983–1987: FC Chaumont
- 1992–199: AS Troyes-Savinienne
- * Club domestic league appearances and goals

Pierre Émile Flamion (13 December 1924 – 3 January 2004) was a French player and football manager who played as a Forward.

== Honours ==
Reims

- Division 1: 1948–49
- Coupe de France: 1949–50

Orders

- Knight of the National Order of Merit: 1998
