= 1955–56 French Division 2 =

17th season of the second-tier football league in France

Division 2
- Season: 1955–56

Statistics of Division 2 in the 1955–56 season.

== Overview ==
It was contested by 20 teams, and Stade Rennais won the championship.

== League standings ==
Pos	Team	Pld	W	D	L	GF	GA	GD	Pts	Promotion or relegation
1	Stade Rennais	38	23	8	7	69	38	+31	54	Promoted
2	Angers	38	25	3	10	90	42	+48	53	Promoted
3	Valenciennes	38	22	7	9	80	39	+41	51	Promoted
4	Béziers	38	20	11	7	69	43	+26	51	
5	Stade Français	38	17	12	9	75	56	+19	46	
6	Olympique Alès	38	17	11	10	64	51	+13	45	
7	Red Star Paris	38	16	10	12	76	69	+7	42	
8	Grenoble	38	12	15	11	46	41	+5	39	
9	Besançon	38	14	11	13	54	54	0	39	
10	Roubaix-Tourcoing	38	16	4	18	63	64	−1	36	
11	Cannes	38	13	9	16	48	69	−21	35	
12	Le Havre	38	12	10	16	45	47	−2	34	
13	Toulon	38	10	13	15	54	62	−8	33	
14	Aix-en-Provence	38	11	10	17	56	69	−13	32	
15	Perpignan	38	10	12	16	36	57	−21	32	
16	Rouen	38	12	7	19	47	56	−9	31	
17	Nantes	38	10	10	18	54	84	−30	30	
18	Sète	38	10	7	21	42	74	−32	27	
19	CA Paris	38	8	10	20	45	66	−21	26	
20	Montpellier	38	7	10	21	48	80	−32	24	

Source: rsssf.com
