= 1960–61 Coupe de France =

Tournament details
- Country: France

The Coupe de France's results of the 1960–61 season. UA Sedan-Torcy won the final played on May 13, 1961, beating Nîmes Olympique.

== Round of 16 ==
Team 1	Score	Team 2
UA Sedan-Torcy (D1)	2–0	RC Strasbourg (D2)
Girondins de Bordeaux (D2)	3–1	SM Caen (CFA)
AS Saint-Étienne (D1)	3–1	FC Sochaux-Montbéliard (D2)
Nîmes Olympique (D1)	2–1	FC Nancy (D1)
RC Paris (D1)	3–1	Olympique Lyonnais (D1)
SO Montpellier (D2)	4–0	Cluses (CFA)
Stade de Reims (D1)	3–1	Olympique Alès (D2)
OGC Nice (D1)	6–2	CO Roubaix-Tourcoing (D2)

== Quarter-finals ==
Team 1	Score	Team 2
UA Sedan-Torcy (D1)	2–1	OGC Nice (D1)
Girondins de Bordeaux (D2)	2–2 (a.e.t.)	AS Saint-Étienne (D1)
Nîmes Olympique (D1)	3–2 (a.e.t.)	RC Paris (D1)
SO Montpellier (D2)	2–0	Stade de Reims (D1)
Replay
Girondins de Bordeaux (D2)	1–1 (a.e.t.)	AS Saint-Étienne (D1)
2nd replay
Girondins de Bordeaux (D2)	2–0	AS Saint-Étienne (D1)

== Semi-finals ==
16 April 1961

UA Sedan-Torcy (1)	2–2 (a.e.t.)	Girondins de Bordeaux (2)
Mouchel 33'; Fulgenzy 54'	(Report)	Bourdoncle 34'; Gori 65'

20 April 1961

UA Sedan-Torcy (1)	1–0	Girondins de Bordeaux (2)
Salem 85'	(Report)

16 April 1961

Nîmes Olympique (1)	2–1	SO Montpellier (2)
Constantino 14'; Barlaguet 66'	(Report)	Sékou 70'

== Final ==
7 May 1961

Sedan	3–1	Nîmes
Fulgenzi 16'; Brény 74'; Salem 82'		Constantino 86'

Stade Olympique Yves-du-Manoir, Colombes
Attendance: 39,070
Referee: Marcel Bois
