= Louis Dugauguez =

French footballer (1918–1991)

Personal information
- Date of birth: 21 February 1918
- Place of birth: Thénac, Charente-Maritime, France
- Date of death: 22 September 1991 (aged 73)
- Position: Midfielder

Senior career*
Years	Team	Apps	(Gls)
- Bully
- Béthune
1938–1942	Lens		
1943	Toulouse		
- Carvin
1948–1952	Sedan		

Managerial career
- 1948–1963: Sedan
- 1964–1974: Sedan
- 1967–1968: France
- * Club domestic league appearances and goals

Louis Dugauguez (21 February 1918 – 22 September 1991) was a French football player and manager.

== Playing career ==
Dugauguez played amateur football for Bully, Béthune, Lens, Toulouse, Carvin and Sedan, where he began his coaching career as a player-coach of the side.

== Coaching career ==
Dugauguez managed Sedan and led the team to success in Coupe de France twice, in 1956 and 1961. In 1967, he became France national team manager, but his stint was short and unsuccessful.

Sedan's stadium is named after him.
