= 1962–63 Coupe de France =

Tournament details
- Country: France

The Coupe de France's results of the 1962–63 season. AS Monaco won the final played on May 12 and May 23, 1963, beating Olympique Lyonnais.

== Round of 16 ==
Team 1	Score	Team 2
AS Brest (CFA)	1–0	RC Paris (D1)
UA Sedan-Torcy (D1)	1–0	Toulouse FC (D1)
Girondins de Bordeaux (D1)	5–0	AC Cambrai (DH)
Olympique Lyonnais (D1)	2–1	Olympique de Marseille (D1)
Limoges FC (D2)	2–0	Red Star Saint-Ouen (D2)
AS Monaco (D1)	1–1 (a.e.t.)	FC Sochaux-Montbéliard (D2)
Toulon (D2)	0–0 (a.e.t.)	Angers SCO (D1)
Stade de Reims (D1)	10–0	SR Creutzwald (DH)
Replay
AS Monaco (D1)	5–1	FC Sochaux-Montbéliard (D2)
Toulon (D2)	1–0	Angers SCO (D1)

== Quarter-finals ==
Team 1	Score	Team 2
Olympique Lyonnais (D1)	1–0	UA Sedan-Torcy (D1)
AS Monaco (D1)	2–0	Girondins de Bordeaux (D1)
Stade de Reims (D1)	4–3 (a.e.t.)	Limoges FC (D2)
Toulon (D2)	1–0	AS Brest (CFA)

== Semi-finals ==
21 April 1963

AS Monaco (1)	3–2	Stade de Reims (1)
Taberner 10'; Casolari 65'; Moreau 76' (o.g.)	(Report)	Vincent 15'; Akesbi 56'

21 April 1963

Olympique Lyonnais (1)	3–1	Toulon (2)
Combin 38', 68'; Di Nallo 81'	(Report)	Oliver 81' (pen.)

== Final ==
12 May 1963

Monaco	0–0 (a.e.t.)	Lyon

Parc des Princes, Paris
Attendance: 32,923
Referee: Pierre Schwinte

=== Replay ===
23 May 1963

Monaco	2–0	Lyon
Cossou 56'; Casolari 84'

Parc des Princes, Paris
Attendance: 24,910
Referee: Pierre Schwinte
