= Mohamed Salem (footballer, born 1940) =

Algerian footballer

Personal information
- Full name: Mohamed Salem
- Date of birth: 24 May 1940
- Place of birth: Oran, Algeria
- Date of death: 4 May 2008 (aged 67)
- Place of death: Belfort, France
- Height: 1.78 m (5 ft 10 in)
- Position: Striker

Senior career*
| Years | Team | Apps | (Gls) |
| –1956 | MC Oran | | |
| 1956–1959 | Saint-Rémy de Provence | | |
| 1959–1964 | UA Sedan-Torcy | 103 | (58) |
| 1964–1967 | Daring de Bruxelles | | (21) |
| 1967–1972 | RC Paris-Sedan | 152 | (35) |

International career
| 1963–1968 | Algeria | 4 | (1) |
- * Club domestic league appearances and goals

Mohamed "Ben" Salem (May 24, 1940 in Oran, French Algeria – May 4, 2008 in Belfort, France) was an Algerian association football player who spent most of his career with CS Sedan. He started his career as a striker before ending his career as a defender. He is CS Sedan's second all-time top scorer with 107 goals for the club, including 81 goals in the French top flight.

== Club career ==
- -1956 MC Oran
- 1956-1959 FC Saint-Rémy de Provence
- 1959-1964 UA Sedan-Torcy
- 1964-1967 Daring de Bruxelles
- 1967-1972 RC Paris-Sedan

== Honours ==
- Won the Coupe de France once with UA Sedan-Torcy in 1961
- Won the Ligue 2 Championship once with RC Paris-Sedan in 1972
- Finalist of the Coupe Drago once with UA Sedan-Torcy in 1963
- Second all-time scorer for CS Sedan with 107 goals
- Scored 81 goals in Ligue 1
- Has 4 caps for the Algerian National Team (1963–1968)
