= Georges Casolari =

French footballer (1941-2012)

Personal information
- Date of birth: 5 May 1941
- Place of birth: Nice, France
- Date of death: 7 October 2012 (aged 71)
- Position: Defender

Senior career*
Years	Team	Apps	(Gls)
1959–1970	AS Monaco FC	216	(13)

International career
1963–1964	France	3	(0)
- * Club domestic league appearances and goals

Georges Casolari (5 May 1941 – 7 October 2012) was a French footballer.
