= Maxime Fulgenzy =

French footballer (born 1934)

Personal information
- Date of birth: 26 June 1934 (age 92)
- Place of birth: Deville, France
- Height: 1.74 m (5 ft 9 in)
- Position: Forward

Senior career*
Years	Team	Apps	(Gls)
1951–1966	UA Sedan Torcy		
1966–1968	Marseille		
1968–1972	Mouzon		

International career
1961	France	1	(0)
- * Club domestic league appearances and goals

Maxime Fulgenzy (born 26 June 1934) is a French former footballer who played as a forward. He made one appearance for the France national team in 1961.
