= AS Troyes-Savinienne =

French football club

Association Sportive Troyenne et Savinienne, also known as AS Troyes-Savinienne, was a French football club based in Troyes.

== History ==
The club was formed in 1931 from the merger of Troyes club Union Sportive Troyenne and AS Savinienne, a club from the town's suburbs. The newly formed club became professional in 1935, and joined Ligue 2. The club reached Première Division in 1954/55, under the guidance of manager and former international player Roger Courtois (1952–1963), with players such as Abdelaziz Ben Tifour, Marcel Artelesa or Pierre Flamion. The club reached the Coupe de France final in 1956, against CS Sedan Ardennes, which they went on to lose 3–1. The same day, the youth team of the club won the Coupe Gambardella, the French Youth cup. That very same year, the club failed to keep its place in French top flight, and was back in Division 2. It finally succeed in reaching the Première Division again in 1960, but only lasted one season, and was relegated in 1961. The club had some financial difficulties, and had to leave professional football at the end of the 1962–1963 season, which they finished 17th out of 20. They continued for four more seasons at regional level, under the guidance of former ASTS player Jacques Diebold, before disappearing.

== Honours ==
- Coupe de France:
  - Runners-up (1): 1956
- Coupe Gambardella
  - Winners (1): 1956
  - Runners-up (1): 1957

== See also ==
- ES Troyes AC
