= Pierre Barlaguet =

French footballer (1931–2018)

Personal information
- Full name: Pierre Barlaguet
- Date of birth: 18 October 1931
- Place of birth: Calvisson, Gard, France
- Date of death: 16 October 2018 (aged 86)
- Position: Midfielder

Senior career*
Years	Team	Apps	(Gls)
1950–1964	Nîmes		

Managerial career
- Mazamet
- Châtellerault
- Vichy
- Bourges
- 1982–1984: Nîmes
- 1994–1996: Nîmes
- * Club domestic league appearances and goals

Pierre Barlaguet (18 October 1931 – 16 October 2018) was a French football manager and player, known for his association with Nîmes. He also managed Mazamet, Châtellerault, Vichy and Bourges.

== Honours ==
Orders

- Knight of the Legion of Honour: 1997
