= 1961–62 French Division 2 =

23rd season of the second-tier football league in France

Division 2
- Season: 1961–62

Statistics of Division 2 in the 1961–62 season.

== Overview ==
It was contested by 19 teams, and Grenoble won the championship.

== League standings ==
Pos	Team	Pld	W	D	L	GF	GA	GD	Pts	Promotion or relegation
1	Grenoble	36	23	6	7	65	35	+30	52	Promoted
2	Valenciennes	36	19	8	9	59	30	+29	46	Promoted
3	Girondins Bordeaux	36	17	12	7	54	31	+23	46	Promoted
4	Olympique Marseille	36	17	10	9	50	38	+12	44	Promoted
5	AS Troyes	36	15	11	10	69	59	+10	41	
6	Nantes	36	16	8	12	43	43	0	40	
7	Besançon	36	15	9	12	38	37	+1	39	
8	Lille	36	14	9	13	64	56	+8	37	
9	Toulon	36	13	10	13	42	38	+4	36	
10	Red Star Paris	36	13	10	13	50	51	−1	36	
11	Limoges	36	14	7	15	64	60	+4	35	
12	Aix-en-Provence	36	11	13	12	36	40	−4	35	
13	Cannes	36	14	6	16	53	57	−4	34	
14	US Boulogne	36	12	7	17	47	59	−12	31	
15	Cherbourg	36	11	7	18	47	64	−17	29	
16	Forbach	36	6	14	16	42	58	−16	26	
17	Béziers	36	8	10	18	46	64	−18	26	
18	CA Paris	36	7	12	17	34	49	−15	26	
19	Roubaix-Tourcoing	36	8	9	19	40	66	−26	25	

Source: rsssf.com
