= Yvon Douis =

French footballer (1935–2021)

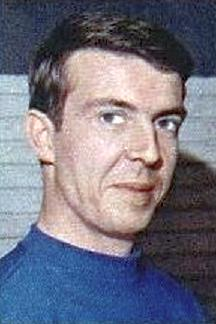
- Douis in 1966

Personal information
- Date of birth: 16 May 1935
- Place of birth: Les Andelys, France
- Date of death: 28 January 2021 (aged 85)
- Place of death: Nice, France
- Position: Striker

Youth career
- 1948–1949: Brignoles

Senior career*
Years	Team	Apps	(Gls)
1953–1959	Lille	172	(62)
1959–1961	Le Havre	71	(28)
1961–1967	Monaco	167	(62)
1967–1969	Cannes	81	(26)
Total		491	(178)

International career
1957–1965	France	20	(4)
Medal record
Representing France
FIFA World Cup
Third place	1958 Sweden
- * Club domestic league appearances and goals

Yvon Douis (16 May 1935 – 28 January 2021) was a French professional footballer who played as a striker.

== Career ==
Douis was born in Les Andelys. During his career he played for Lille OSC (1953–59), Le Havre AC (1959–61), AS Monaco (1961–67) and AS Cannes (1967–69). He earned 20 caps and scored 4 goals for the France national football team between 1957 and 1965, and played in the 1958 FIFA World Cup, in which France finished third. Douis scored in the third place play off against West Germany at Sweden 1958.

== Personal life ==
Yvon was the older brother of Jean-François, who was also a footballer.

== Death ==
Douis died of COVID-19 during the COVID-19 pandemic in France.
