= 1954–55 French Division 2 =

16th season of the second-tier football league in France

Division 2
- Season: 1954–55

Statistics of Division 2 in the 1954–55 season.

== Overview ==
It was contested by 20 teams, and Sedan Torcy won the championship.

== League standings ==
Pos	Team	Pld	W	D	L	GF	GA	GD	Pts	Promotion or relegation
1	CS Sedan-Ardennes	38	26	9	3	102	30	+72	61	Promoted
2	Red Star Paris	38	24	7	7	99	43	+56	55	
3	Stade Rennais	38	22	8	8	83	48	+35	52	
4	Le Havre	38	19	11	8	74	54	+20	49	
5	Valenciennes	38	20	7	11	90	66	+24	47	
6	Angers	38	19	8	11	71	52	+19	46	
7	Sète	38	15	13	10	40	30	+10	43	
8	Rouen	38	17	8	13	59	47	+12	42	
9	Olympique Alès	38	12	12	14	54	52	+2	36	
10	Nantes	38	13	9	16	69	78	−9	35	
11	Béziers	38	12	11	15	48	65	−17	35	
12	Toulon	38	12	10	16	53	78	−25	34	
13	Stade Français	38	12	9	17	59	71	−12	33	
14	Cannes	38	9	13	16	55	67	−12	31	
15	Aix-en-Provence	38	10	10	18	54	80	−26	30	
16	Besançon	38	13	3	22	72	96	−24	29	
17	Montpellier	38	10	9	19	49	88	−39	29	
18	Perpignan	38	10	6	22	45	66	−21	26	
19	Grenoble	38	7	12	19	50	77	−27	26	
20	CA Paris	38	4	13	21	38	76	−38	21	

Source: rsssf.com
