= Lucien Cossou =

French footballer (born 1936)

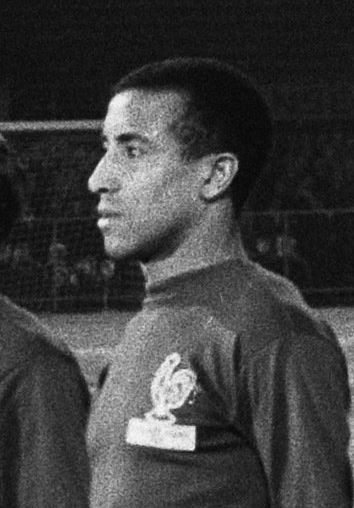
- Lucien Cossou in 1963

Personal information
- Full name: Lucien Cossou
- Date of birth: 29 January 1936 (age 90)
- Place of birth: Marseille, France
- Position: Midfielder

Senior career*
Years	Team	Apps	(Gls)
1954–1956	Aix-en-Provence	62	(26)
1956–1959	Lyon	91	(35)
1959–1965	Monaco	161	(97)
1965–1966	Toulon	24	(10)
1966–1968	Aix-en-Provence	66	(27)
1970–1972	La Ciotat	44	(9)
Total		448	(204)

International career
1960–1964	France	6	(4)
- * Club domestic league appearances and goals

Lucien Cossou (born 29 January 1936) is a former professional French footballer.
