= Ligue 1 =

French association football league

- Organising body: Ligue de Football Professionnel (LFP)
- Founded: 1932; 94 years ago (officially); 2002; 24 years ago (as Ligue 1)
- Country: France (17 teams)
- Other club from: Monaco (1 team)
- Confederation: UEFA
- President: Vincent Labrune
- Number of clubs: 18 (since 2023–24)
- Level on pyramid: 1
- Relegation to: Ligue 2
- Domestic cups: Coupe de France; Trophée des Champions
- International cups: UEFA Champions League; UEFA Europa League; UEFA Conference League
- Current champions: Paris Saint-Germain (14th title) (2025–26)
- Most championships: Paris Saint-Germain (14 titles)
- Most appearances: Mickaël Landreau (618)
- Top scorer: Delio Onnis (299)
- Broadcaster: See § Media coverage
- Sponsor: McDonald's
- Website: ligue1.com
- Current: 2026–27 Ligue 1

Ligue 1 (French: [liɡ œ̃]; lit. 'League 1'), officially known as Ligue 1 McDonald's for sponsorship reasons, is a professional association football league in France and the highest level of the French football league system. Administered by the Ligue de Football Professionnel, Ligue 1 is contested by 18 clubs and operates on a system of promotion and relegation from and to Ligue 2. Seasons run from August to May. Most games are played on Saturdays and Sundays, with a few games played during weekday evenings.

Ligue 1 was inaugurated on 11 September 1932 under the name National before switching to Division 1 after a year of existence. It continued to operate under that name until 2002, when it adopted its current name. Ligue 1 ranks fifth in the UEFA coefficient rankings as of 2025–26 based on performances in European competitions over the past five seasons, behind England's Premier League, Italy's Serie A, Spain's La Liga and Germany's Bundesliga.

PSG are the most successful club, with 14 league titles, and the current defending champions as of the 2026–27 season.

== History ==
=== Foundation ===
Professionalism in French football did not exist until July 1930, when the National Council of the French Football Federation (FFF) voted 128–20 in favour of its adoption. Prior to this, the first division of French football was contested between 1894 and 1929 through an amateur league run by the USFSA.

The founders of professionalism in French football were Georges Bayrou, Emmanuel Gambardella and Gabriel Hanot. Professionalism was officially implemented on 11 September 1932.

In order to successfully create a professional football league in the country, the Federation limited the league to twenty clubs. In order to participate in the competition, clubs were subjected to three important criteria:

- The incoming club must have had positive results in the past.
- The incoming club must be able to pull in enough revenue to balance its finances.
- The incoming club must be able to successfully recruit at least eight professional players.

Many clubs disagreed with the subjective criteria, most notably Strasbourg, RC Roubaix, Amiens and Stade Français, while others like Rennes, due to fear of bankruptcy, and Lille, due to a conflict of interest, were reluctant to become professional. Lille's president, Henri Jooris, also chairman of the Ligue du Nord, feared his league would fold and proposed it become the second division of the new league. Eventually, many clubs earned professional status, though it became more difficult to convince clubs in the northern half of the country; Strasbourg, Roubaix and Amiens refused to accept the new league, while conversely Mulhouse, Excelsior AC Roubaix, Metz and Fives accepted professionalism. In southern France, clubs such as Marseille, Hyères, Montpellier, Nîmes, Cannes, Antibes and Nice were extremely supportive of the new league and accepted their professional status without argument.

=== Establishment ===
Division 1 champions (Pre-WWII)
Season	Winner
1932–33	Olympique Lillois
1933–34	Sète
1934–35	Sochaux
1935–36	Racing Club de France
1936–37	Marseille
1937–38	Sochaux
1938–39	Sète
Further information: French football champions

The league's inaugural season of the all-professional league, called National, was held in the 1932–1933 season. The 20 inaugural members of National were Antibes, CA Paris, Cannes, Club Français, Excelsior AC Roubaix, Fives, Hyères, Marseille, Metz, Mulhouse, Nice, Nîmes, Alès, Lille, Racing Club de France, Red Star Olympique, Rennes, Sochaux, Sète and Montpellier. The 20 clubs were inserted into two groups of 10 with the bottom three of each group suffering relegation to Division 2. The two winners of each group would then face each other in a final held at a neutral venue, which later turned out to the Stade Olympique Yves-du-Manoir.

The first final was held on 14 May 1933 and it matched the winner of Group A, Olympique Lillois, against the runner-up of Group B, Cannes. Antibes, the winner of Group B, was supposed to take part in the final but was suspected of bribery by the French Football Federation and was disqualified. In the first final, Olympique Lillois were crowned the inaugural champions following the club's 4–3 victory.

After the season, the league decided to retain the 14 clubs and not promote any sides from the second division. The league also agreed to change its name from National to simply Division 1. For the 1934–35 season, the league organised a legitimate promotion and relegation system bringing the total tally of clubs in the first division to 16. The number remained until the 1938–39 season.

The pre-war years were an open period in which several clubs had the opportunity to be crowned French champions. FC Sochaux-Montbéliard was the first club to win twice.

Because of World War II, football was suspended by the French government and the Ligue de Football Professionnel (LFP) although its member clubs continued playing in regional competitions. During the "war championships", as they are called, professionalism was abolished by the Vichy regime and clubs were forced to participate in regional leagues, designated as Zone Sud and Zone Nord. Due to its non-association with the two leagues, the LFP and FFF do not recognise the championships won by the clubs and thus 1939–1945 is non-existent in the two organisations' view.

=== Post-war development ===
Following the conclusion of the war and the liberation of France, professional football returned to France. The first division increased its allotment of clubs to 18. This number remained until the 1965–66 season when the number was increased to 20.

The post-war period saw the emergence of new flagship clubs like Lille OSC and OGC Nice. Stade de Reims was the dominant club of the 1950s and early 1960s, which reached the European Champion Clubs' Cup final twice. Then, from the 1960s to the early 1980s, AS Saint-Étienne and FC Nantes dominated French football and engaged in a fierce rivalry at the top. In the mid-to late 1980s, Girondins de Bordeaux established themselves as the main force of the French first league under manager Aimé Jacquet.

During the late 1980s and early 1990s, Olympique de Marseille were a dominant team, winning four consecutive league titles from 1988–89 to 1991–92, and starred Chris Waddle, Rudi Völler, and Ballon d'Or winner Jean-Pierre Papin, becoming in 1993 the first french club to win the UEFA Champions League. Later in the 1990s, several clubs have emerged at the top of the national and European scene, such as PSG with George Weah, David Ginola and Raí, the Nantes of Claude Makélélé and Japhet N'Doram, the Bordeaux of Zinedine Zidane, Bixente Lizarazu and Johan Micoud or the foreign-based club AS Monaco featuring Thierry Henry and David Trezeguet, who would both go on to be amongst the most prolific strikers in Europe.

=== Modern period ===
In 2002, the league changed its name from Division 1 to its current name, Ligue 1.

In the 2000s, Olympique Lyonnais established a dynasty, winning 7 consecutive titles (2002–2008) — an unprecedented run in French football. From 2009–2012, four consecutive different clubs won the league: Bordeaux in 2008–09, Marseille in 2009–10, Lille In 2010–11, and Montpellier in 2011–12. During this era, Lille's Eden Hazard emerged as the league's star player.

From 2012 onwards, the Qatar Sports Investments (QSI) takeover allowed Paris Saint-Germain to sign top players like Zlatan Ibrahimović, Thiago Silva, Neymar, Kylian Mbappé and Lionel Messi, ushering in an era of complete dominance that lead them to win 12 championships and 2 UEFA Champions League since then.

Ahead of the 2023–24 season, the number of teams in the league was reduced to 18; four teams in the 2022–23 Ligue 1 were relegated to Ligue 2 and only two teams in Ligue 2 were promoted to Ligue 1.

== Format ==
- 20 clubs: 1932–1933
- 14 clubs: 1933–1934
- 16 clubs: 1934–1939
- 18 clubs: 1945–1946
- 20 clubs: 1946–1947
- 18 clubs: 1947–1958
- 20 clubs: 1958–1963
- 18 clubs: 1963–1965
- 20 clubs: 1965–1968
- 18 clubs: 1968–1970
- 20 clubs: 1970–1997
- 18 clubs: 1997–2002
- 20 clubs: 2002–2023
- 18 clubs: 2023–present

== Competition format ==
There are 18 clubs in Ligue 1. During the course of a season, usually from August to May, each club plays the others twice, once at their home stadium and once at that of their opponents, for a total of 34 games, though special circumstances may allow a club to host matches at other venues such as when Lille hosted Lyon at the Stade de France in 2007 and 2008. Teams receive three points for a win and one point for a draw. No points are awarded for a loss. Teams are ranked by total points, then goal difference, and then goals scored. At the end of each season, the club with the most points is crowned champion. If points are equal, the goal difference and then goals scored determine the winner. If still equal, teams are deemed to occupy the same position. If there is a tie for the championship, for relegation, or for qualification to other competitions, a play-off match at a neutral venue decides rank. For the 2015–16 season only, two teams were to be relegated and only two teams from Ligue 2 were to be promoted, but this decision was overturned and three teams were relegated and three teams promoted. Thus, it was the 2016–17 season which saw the return of a relegation play-off between the 16th-placed Ligue 1 team and the third-placed team in the Ligue 2 on a two-legged confrontation, with the Ligue 2 team hosting the first game.

Previously, the league utilised a different promotion and relegation format. Prior to 1995, the league's format was direct relegation of the bottom two teams and a play-off between the third-last first-division team and the winner of the second-division play-offs, similar to the Dutch Eredivisie, and the German Bundesliga. The league has also experimented with a "bonus" rule. From 1973 to 1976, a rule rewarded teams scoring three or more goals in a game with one extra point, regardless of outcome, with the objective of encouraging offensive play. The experience was ultimately inconclusive. At the start of the 2006–07 season, the league introduced an Attacking Play Table to encourage the scoring of more goals in Ligue 1 and Ligue 2. The LFP, with the help of the former manager Michel Hidalgo introduced the idea to reward those teams who score the most goals. The table was similar to the previous idea, but was independent from the official league table and clubs were only rewarded with monetary bonuses.

In June 2021, the LFP voted overwhelmingly at its general assembly to contract Ligue 1 back to 18 clubs for the 2023–24 season by relegating four to, and promoting two from, Ligue 2 after the 2022–23 season.

=== European qualification ===
As of the 2023–24 season, as determined by the UEFA coefficient, the top four teams in Ligue 1 qualify for the Champions League, with the top three proceeding directly to the group phase. The fourth-placed team enters in the third qualifying round. The fifth-placed team qualifies for the UEFA Europa League, the sixth for UEFA Conference League. The last Europa League place is determined through the country's domestic cup competition, the Coupe de France. If the cup winner qualifies for Europe through their league position, the seventh-placed team in Ligue 1 will qualify for the Conference League. If France is among the top two nations that earned the most coefficient points from a single season, an additional Champions League group phase spot will be awarded to the team in fourth place; as such the Champions League third qualifying round spot and all spots below will be pushed back one position.

== Clubs ==
A total of 74 clubs have played in Ligue 1 from its foundation in the 1932–33 season to the start of the 2025–26 season. Currently, Marseille, Nice and Rennes are the only founding members of the league to be playing in Ligue 1. Paris Saint-Germain is the only club to have not suffered points relegation. They earned promotion to the first division for the 1974–75 season and have not faltered down since. Paris Saint-Germain was administratively relegated by the league following its split from Paris FC in 1972, but returned to the top flight two seasons later. The league has been won on multiple occasions by Monaco, the presence of which within the league makes it a cross-border competition.

Internationally, the most well-known Ligue 1 clubs include Paris Saint-Germain, Marseille, Lyon, Monaco and Lille.

PSG are the most successful club with 14 league titles. Saint-Étienne was the first club with 10 titles. With the presence of 76 seasons in Ligue 1, Marseille holds the record for most seasons among the elite, while PSG hold the league record for longevity with 52 consecutive seasons (from 1974 to present). Nantes is the team with the longest consecutive unbeaten streak (32 matches) and the fewest number of defeats (one match) in a single season, doing so in the 1994–95 campaign. In addition, Nantes also holds the record for the longest time without losing at home with a run of 92 matches from May 1976 to April 1981.

=== Members in 2026–27 ===
The following 18 clubs are competing in the 2026–27 Ligue 1 season.

As of the start 2026–27 Ligue 1 season

Location of teams in 2026–27 Ligue 1

Club	Position in 2025–26	First season in top division	Seasons in Ligue 1	Stadium	Stadium Capacity	Ligue 1 titles	Manager
Angers	13th	1956–57	34	Stade Raymond Kopa	19,800	0	Stéphane Gilli
Auxerre	15th	1980–81	36	Stade de l'Abbé-Deschamps	18,541	1	Will Still
Brest	12th	1979–80	21	Stade Francis-Le Blé	15,931	0	Julien Lachuer
Le Havre	14th	1938–39	28	Stade Océane	25,178	0	Valérien Ismaël
Le Mans	L2 : 2nd	2003–04	7	Stade Marie-Marvingt	25,064	0	Patrick Videira
Lens	2nd	1937–38	65	Stade Bollaert-Delelis	38,223	1	Didier Digard
Lille	3rd	1945–46	67	Stade Pierre-Mauroy	50,186	4	Davide Ancelotti
Lorient	10th	1998–99	19	Stade du Moustoir	18,890	0	Alexandre Dujeux
Lyon	4th	1945–46	69	Parc Olympique Lyonnais	59,186	7	Carlos Vicens
Marseille	5th	1932–33	77	Stade Vélodrome	67,394	9	Bruno Génésio
Monaco	2nd	1953–54	66	Stade Louis II	16,360	8	Filipe Luís
Nice	16th	1932–33	68	Allianz Riviera	36,178	4	Olivier Pantaloni
Paris FC	11th	1972–73	5	Stade Jean-Bouin	20,000	0	Liam Rosenior
Paris Saint-Germain	1st	1971–72	54	Parc des Princes	47,929	14	Luis Enrique
Rennes	6th	1932–33	70	Roazhon Park	29,778	0	Franck Haise
Strasbourg	8th	1934–35	66	Stade de la Meinau	26,109	1	Vítor Matos
Toulouse	9th	1982–83	37	Stadium de Toulouse	33,150	0	Jens Berthel Askou
Troyes	L2 : 1st	1954–55	17	Stade de l'Aube	21,877	0	Stéphane Dumont

=== Seasons in Ligue 1 ===
There are 75 teams that have taken part in 89 Ligue 1 championships that were played from the 1932–33 season until the 2026–27 season. The teams in bold compete in Ligue 1 currently. The teams in italics represent defunct teams. The year in parentheses represents the most recent year of participation at this level. No team has played Ligue 1 football in every season; the closest being Marseille, who has played in 77 seasons.

- **77** seasons: **Marseille** (2027)
- **70** seasons: Saint-Étienne (2025), **Rennes** (2027)
- **69** seasons: Bordeaux (2022), **Lyon** (2027)
- **68** seasons: **Monaco** (2027), **Nice** (2027)
- **67** seasons: **Lille** (2027)
- **66** seasons: Sochaux (2014), **Strasbourg** (2027)
- **65** seasons: Metz (2026), **Lens** (2027)
- **58** seasons: Nantes (2026)
- **54** seasons: **Paris Saint-Germain** (2027)
- **43** seasons: Montpellier (2025)
- **40** seasons: Reims (2025)
- **39** seasons: Nîmes (2021)
- **37** seasons: **Toulouse** (2027)
- **36** seasons: **Auxerre** (2027)
- **34** seasons: Bastia (2017), **Angers** (2027)
- **33** seasons: Valenciennes (2014)
- **30** seasons: Racing Club (1990), Nancy (2017)
- **28** seasons: **Le Havre** (2027)
- **23** seasons: Sedan (2007)
- **22** seasons: Cannes (1998)
- **21** seasons: **Brest** (2027)
- **19** seasons: Toulouse (1937) (1967), Rouen (1985), **Lorient** (2027)
- **18** seasons: Caen (2019)
- **17** seasons: **Troyes** (2027)
- **16** seasons: Sète (1954), Red Star (1975)
- **15** seasons: FC Nancy (1963), Stade Français (1967)
- **14** seasons: Ajaccio (2023)
- **13** seasons: Laval (1989), Guingamp (2019)
- **12** seasons: Toulon (1993)
- **10** seasons: Roubaix-Tourcoing (1955)
- **7** seasons: Antibes (1939), Excelsior (1939), Fives (1939), Lillois (1939), **Le Mans** (2027)
- **6** seasons: Alès (1959), Mulhouse (1990), Dijon (2021)
- **5** seasons: **Paris FC** (2027)
- **4** seasons: Tours (1985), Grenoble (2010), Thonon Evian (2015)
- **3** seasons: RC Roubaix (1939), Limoges (1961), Troyes-Savinienne (1961), Angoulême (1972), Martigues (1996), Amiens (2020), Clermont (2024)
- **2** seasons: CA Paris (1934)
- **1** season: Club Français (1933), Hyères (1933), Colmar (1949), Béziers Hérault (1958), Aix (1968), Avignon (1976), Niort (1988), Gueugnon (1996), Châteauroux (1998), Istres (2005), Boulogne (2010), Arles (2011), Gazélec Ajaccio (2016)

== Finances ==
Ligue 1 clubs' finances and budgets are managed by the DNCG (Direction Nationale du Contrôle de Gestion), an organisation responsible for monitoring the accounts of professional association football clubs in France. It was founded in 1984 and is an administrative directorate of the Ligue de Football Professionnel (LFP). The mission of the DNCG is to oversee all financial operations of the 44 member clubs of the LFP, develop the resources of professional clubs, apply sanctions to those clubs breaking the rules of operation, defend the morals and interests of French football in general.

Following a report by the DNCG, it was determined that the combined budget of Ligue 1 clubs was €910 million for the 2005–06 season, a 39% increase from the 2002–03 season. The prominent reason for the rise was mainly associated with the television rights deal the league regularly signs. Excluding Paris Saint-Germain, many of the top division clubs are extremely healthy with clubs such as Auxerre, Bordeaux, Lille and Lyon being referred to as "managed to perfection". However, recently the DNCG has encouraged clubs to concentrate on limiting their "skyrocketing wage bills and the magnitude of their debts" after it was discovered that the LFP clubs accounts as a whole were in the red for the third consecutive season (2008–2011) with an estimated deficit of €130 million. In 2012, the LFP announced that the clubs deficit had been cut in half from €130 million to €65 million. Ligue 1 ranks fifth in terms of revenue brought in by clubs with the league bringing in £0.6 billion for the 2006–07 season trailing England, Italy, Spain and Germany.

In terms of world football, clubs Lyon and Marseille are among the richest football clubs in the world and regularly feature in the Deloitte Football Money League ranking of football clubs by revenue generated from football operations. In the list compiled in the 2008–09 season, Lyon ranked 13th among clubs generating approximately €139.6 million, while Marseille were right behind them in 14th position generating €133.2 million.

In 2016, just Paris Saint-Germain was in the top 30 of the Deloitte Football Money League (ranked 4). From 2017 to 2020, Paris Saint-Germain (ranked between five and seven) and Lyon (ranked between 17 and 28) were part of the top 30.

== Champions ==
Bold indicates clubs playing in 2026–27 Ligue 1.

Italics indicates clubs that no longer exist.

Club	Titles	Runners-up	Winning seasons
**Paris Saint-Germain**	14	9	1985–86, 1993–94, 2012–13, 2013–14, 2014–15, 2015–16, 2017–18, 2018–19, 2019–20, 2021–22, 2022–23, 2023–24, 2024–25, 2025–26
Saint-Étienne	10	3	1956–57, 1963–64, 1966–67, 1967–68, 1968–69, 1969–70, 1973–74, 1974–75, 1975–76, 1980–81
**Marseille**	9	13	1936–37, 1947–48, 1970–71, 1971–72, 1988–89, 1989–90, 1990–91, 1991–92, 2009–10
**Monaco**	8	7	1960–61, 1962–63, 1977–78, 1981–82, 1987–88, 1996–97, 1999–2000, 2016–17
Nantes	8	7	1964–65, 1965–66, 1972–73, 1976–77, 1979–80, 1982–83, 1994–95, 2000–01
**Lyon**	7	5	2001–02, 2002–03, 2003–04, 2004–05, 2005–06, 2006–07, 2007–08
Bordeaux	6	9	1949–50, 1983–84, 1984–85, 1986–87, 1998–99, 2008–09
Reims	6	3	1948–49, 1952–53, 1954–55, 1957–58, 1959–60, 1961–62
**Lille**	4	6	1945–46, 1953–54, 2010–11, 2020–21
**Nice**	4	3	1950–51, 1951–52, 1955–56, 1958–59
Sochaux	2	3	1934–35, 1937–38
Sète	2	–	1933–34, 1938–39
**Lens**	1	5	1997–98
RC Paris	1	2	1935–36
Olympique Lillois (Note: Both Olympique Lillois and Fives merged to form Lille OSC in 1944.)	1	1	1932–33
**Strasbourg**	1	1	1978–79
Roubaix-Tourcoing	1	–	1946–47
**Auxerre**	1	–	1995–96
Montpellier	1	–	2011–12
Nîmes	–	4	–
Cannes	–	1	–
Fives	–	1	–
Toulouse (1937)	–	1	–
Metz	–	1	–

== Records ==
=== Appearances ===
Rank	Player	Period	Club(s) (Note: where player played Ligue 1 games.)	Games
1	(France) Mickaël Landreau	1996–2014	Nantes, Paris Saint-Germain, Lille, Bastia	618
2	(France) Jean-Luc Ettori	1975–1994	Monaco	602
3	(France) Dominique Dropsy	1971–1989	Valenciennes, Strasbourg, Bordeaux	596
4	(France) Dominique Baratelli	1967–1985	Ajaccio, Nice, Paris Saint-Germain	593
5	(France) Alain Giresse	1970–1988	Bordeaux, Marseille	586
6	(France) Sylvain Kastendeuch	1982–2001	Metz, Saint-Étienne, Toulouse	577
7	(France) Patrick Battiston	1973–1991	Bordeaux, Metz, Saint-Étienne, Monaco	558
8	(France) Steve Mandanda	2007–2016; 2017–2025	Marseille, Rennes	555
9	(France) Jacky Novi	1964–1980	Marseille, Nîmes, Paris Saint-Germain, Strasbourg	545
10	(France) Roger Marche	1944–1962	Reims, RC Paris	542

Notes

Italics denotes players still playing professional football,
Bold denotes players still playing in Ligue 1.

=== Goalscorers ===
Rank	Player	Period	Club(s) (Note: where player scored Ligue 1 goals)	Goals	Games	Ratio
1	(Argentina) Delio Onnis	1971–1986	Monaco, Reims, Tours, Toulon	299	449	0.67
2	(France) Bernard Lacombe	1969–1987	Lyon, Saint-Étienne, Bordeaux	255	497	0.51
3	(France) Hervé Revelli	1965–1978	Saint-Étienne, Nice	216	389	0.56
4	(France) Roger Courtois	1932–1956	Sochaux, Troyes	210	288	0.73
5	(France) Thadée Cisowski	1947–1961	Metz, RC Paris, Valenciennes	206	286	0.72
6	(France) Roger Piantoni	1950–1966	Nancy, Reims, Nice	203	394	0.52
7	(France) Kylian Mbappé	2015–2024	Monaco, Paris Saint-Germain	191	246	0.78
8	(France) Joseph Ujlaki	1947–1964	Stade Français, Sète, Nîmes, Nice, RC Paris	190	438	0.43
9	(France) Fleury Di Nallo	1960–1975	Lyon, Red Star	187	425	0.44
10	(Argentina) Carlos Bianchi	1973–1980	Reims, Paris Saint-Germain, Strasbourg	179	220	0.81
10	(Sweden) Gunnar Andersson	1950–1960	Marseille, Bordeaux	179	234	0.76

Notes

Italics denotes players still playing professional football,
Bold denotes players still playing in Ligue 1.

== Media coverage ==
Canal+ was the first broadcaster of the French League on television. The first match broadcast was Nantes vs. Monaco on November 9, 1984. Canal+ held a monopoly for 17 years, implementing numerous innovations in broadcasting techniques and transforming football into a "spectacle". The creation of numerous programs surrounding the league, analysing matches or revealing behind-the-scenes glimpses of the clubs, contributed to popularizing the league throughout the country.

French authorities, keen to break Canal+'s monopoly, encouraged the emergence of TPS, which entered into competition with Canal+ for Ligue 1 TV rights in 1999 for the period 2001-2004. The two broadcasters shared the rights for 325 million euros per year plus an advance paid of 1 billion francs for the 1999-2000 season. The competition will raise TV rights to 375 million euros for the 2004-05 season. The battle between the two French broadcasters ended with a record offer (an average of €600 million per year) from Canal+ at the end of 2004 to secure exclusive broadcasting rights for three years. The direct consequence was the disappearance of TPS in the following years, absorbed by Canal+.

In 2008, it was the turn of the giant Orange to enter the sports broadcasting market in France with the aim of associating sports rights in its ISP offers and gaining market share on it. Canal+ made an offer of 460 million euros by season, but Orange obtained a major match every weekend with an offer of 208 million euros. Unfortunately, Orange failed to make its strategy profitable and decided to not repeat the experiment after 2012.

In June 2011, LFP reached agreements with the premium channels Canal+ and BeIN Sports. BeIN Media Group, paid the LFP €510 million over four seasons for 8 matches while Canal+ had acquired the 2 best matches. The total amount paid is €607 million per year. In 2014, both channels renewed their contract with the LFP until 2020. Canal+ regained the third pick of matches, in addition to having managed to retain the rights to the two best games. The value of the broadcasting rights increased significantly, reaching €726.5 million per year. Canal+ will pay a total of €540 million per year and beIN Sports €186.5 million per year.

In 2018, Mediapro acquired three of the four major packages of LFP media rights for the 2020–21 season through to the 2023–24 season, largely replacing Canal+ in a deal valued at a record €1.15 billion. BeIN Sports maintained "lot 3", which contained two matches per-week on Saturday nights and Sunday afternoons. Mediapro was expected to establish a new channel to house these rights. BeIN Sports later sub-licensed its package to Canal+. In June 2020, Mediapro announced a partnership with TF1, under which the new channel would leverage the network's talent and resources, and be branded as Téléfoot—an extension of TF1's long-running football programme. Téléfoot presenters Grégoire Margotton and Bixente Lizarazu served as the lead broadcast team for at least 20 matches per-season.

Seeking to renegotiate its contract due to the financial impact of COVID-19, Mediapro began withholding its rights payments to the LFP in October 2020. LFP CEO Arnaud Rouger stated in October 2020 that they may have to pursue a new broadcaster if they are unable to resolve the dispute with Mediapro. In December 2020, it was reported that Mediapro were preparing to wind down Téléfoot, after it agreed to compensate the LFP for the two missed rights payments. In February 2021, Canal+ reached an interim agreement to acquire the rights packages held by Mediapro for the remainder of the season, and later sub-licensed Ligue 2 to BeIN; Téléfoot shut down on 8 February 2021.

In June 2021, the LFP resold the Mediapro broadcast rights packages for Ligue 1 to Amazon Prime Video for the 2021–22 season through to the 2023–24 season for only €250 million per season. Canal+ keeping its "lot 3" at historical price (€332 million for 2 matches that do not contain the best matchups), the two broadcasters and Free (which has the digital rights) paying a total of €663 million in total. In August 2023, Canal+ announced a sub-licensing agreement with DAZN to stream its matches on a branded channel within the service as part of DAZN's local launch. Canal+, in legal conflict with the LFP and which had positioned itself in 2021 to reclaim all the rights and was upset at not having obtained them, did not plan to renew its rights after the conclusion of the 2023–24 season.

In the summer of 2024, after lengthy discussions, DAZN acquired 8 out of 9 matches for €400m while BeIN Sports acquired one match for €100m. But in April 2025, both the LFP and DAZN came to an agreement to end the rights broadcast deal due to a legal dispute between the two parties over unpaid rights payments. L'Équipe reported that DAZN was to pay the LFP €100m to exit the agreement, as well as the remaining €140m it owed to the organisation for the final two instalments.

In July 2025, the LFP announced that an in-house streaming service named Ligue 1+ would be launched on 15 August, in time for the 2025–26 season. Of the nine weekly matches in Ligue 1's 18-team configuration, Ligue 1+ will exclusively broadcast eight, and BeIN will retain its allocation of one, broadcast on Saturdays, for one year more. For the 2025–26 season, the Ligue 1 would distribute approximately €142 million in media-revenue to its clubs via its new direct-to-consumer streaming service Ligue 1+. For the 2026–27 season, LFP gets back the rights to the match from BeIN Sports and Ligue 1+ becomes the exclusive broadcaster of the French league.

=== International broadcasters ===
==== Africa ====
Country	Broadcasters
Sub-Saharan Africa	Canal+ Afrique
Sub-Saharan Africa	SuperSport

==== Americas ====
Country	Broadcasters
Brazil	CazéTV; XSports; CNN Brasil
Canada	beIN Sports
Central America	ESPN
Mexico	Fox
South America	ESPN
Suriname	STVS
United States	beIN Sports
Puerto Rico	beIN Sports

==== Asia and Oceania ====
Country	Broadcasters
Australia	TBD
Bangladesh	Tapmad
Brunei	TBD
Cambodia	TBD
Central Asia	Setanta Sports
China	Migu; CCTV-5
Hong Kong	beIN Sports
Indian subcontinent	Star Sports
Indonesia	Emtek
Iran	Persiana Sports
Japan	DAZN
Laos	JAS
Malaysia	TBD
Myanmar	Bebee TV Sports
New Zealand	TBD
Pakistan	Tapmad
Philippines	TBD
Singapore	TBD
South Korea	Coupang Play
Taiwan	ELTA
Tajikistan	Varzish TV
Thailand	MONOMAX
Uzbekistan	Sport
Vietnam	ON Sports

==== Europe ====
Country	Broadcasters
Albania	SuperSport
Andorra	DAZN
Armenia	Fast Sports
Austria	DAZN
Azerbaijan	Setanta Sports; SportTV
Belarus	Kinopoisk
Belgium	DAZN
Bosnia and Herzegovina	Arena Sport
Bulgaria	Diema Sport
Croatia	Arena Sport
Cyprus	Cablenet Sports
Czech Republic	Nova Sport
Denmark	Viaplay
Estonia	Setanta Sports; Go3 Sport
Finland	Viaplay
Georgia	Setanta Sports
Germany	DAZN
Greece	TBD
Hungary	TBD
Iceland	Livey
Ireland	Ligue 1+
Italy	Ligue 1+
Kosovo	Sport
Latvia	Setanta Sports; Go3 Sport
Liechtenstein	DAZN; Sky Sport
Lithuania	Setanta Sports; Go3 Sport
Luxembourg	DAZN
Malta	TVMSport+
Moldova	Setanta Sports
Montenegro	Arena Sport
Netherlands	Viaplay
North Macedonia	Arena Sport
Norway	Viaplay
Poland	Eleven Sports
Portugal	Sport TV
Romania	Voyo
Russia	Okko Sport
San Marino	TBD
Serbia	Arena Sport
Slovakia	Nova Sport
Slovenia	Arena Sport
Spain	DAZN
Sweden	Viaplay
Switzerland	DAZN; Sky Sport
Turkey	beIN Sports
Ukraine	MEGOGO
United Kingdom	Ligue 1+

==== Middle East and North Africa ====
Country	Broadcasters
MENA	beIN Sports
Israel	Sport5

== Awards ==
=== Trophy ===
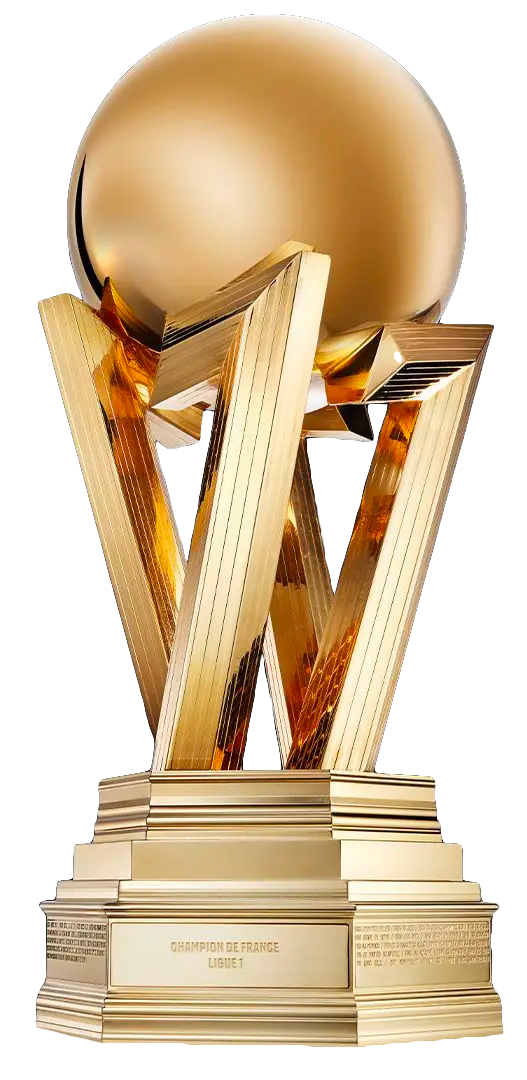
2024–present Ligue 1 trophy.

The previous Ligue 1 trophy, L'Hexagoal, was developed by the Ligue de Football Professionnel and designed and created by Pablo Reinoso. The trophy has been awarded to the champion of France since the end of the 2006–07 season, replacing the previous Ligue 1 trophy that had existed for only five years. The name Hexagoal was derived from an official competition created by the LFP and French TV channel TF1 to determine a name for the new trophy. Over 9,000 proposals were sent in and, on 20 May 2007, French Football Federation member Frédéric Thiriez announced that, following an online vote, the term Hexagoal had received half of the votes. The first club to hoist the new trophy was Olympique Lyonnais who earned the honour after winning the 2007–08 season.

The current Ligue 1 trophy, which was created by Mathias Kiss, will be awarded beginning with the 2024–25 season. Announced on 17 October 2024, the yet-to-be-named trophy features a hexagonal base at the bottom and a gold-plated sphere at the top that is supported by "1"-shaped columns.

=== Monthly and annual ===
In addition to the winner's trophy and the individual winner's medal players receive, Ligue 1 also awards the monthly Player of the Month award. Following the season, the UNFP Awards are held and awards such as the Player of the Year, Manager of the Year, and Young Player of the Year from both Ligue 1 and Ligue 2 are handed out.

== Sponsorship names ==
- Ligue 1 Orange (2002–2008)
- Ligue 1 Conforama (2017–2020)
- Ligue 1 Uber Eats (2020–2024)
- Ligue 1 McDonald's (2024–)

== See also ==
- Football records and statistics in France
- List of football clubs in France
- List of foreign Ligue 1 players
