= CS Sedan Ardennes =

French football club

Sedan
- Full name: Club Sportif Sedan Ardennes
- Nickname: Les Sangliers (The Boars)
- Founded: 2 November 1919; 106 years ago
- Ground: Stade Louis Dugauguez
- Capacity: 24,389
- President: Daniel Guérin
- Head coach: Elise Bussaglia
- League: Régional 1 Grand Est
- 2024–25: Régional 2 Grand Est Group A, 1st of 12 (promoted)
- Website: cs-sedan.fr/cssa-football/
| Home colours | Away colours |

Club Sportif Sedan Ardennes, commonly referred to as CS Sedan or simply Sedan (French pronunciation: [sədɑ̃]), is a football club based in Sedan, France. The club was formed in 1919 and plays its home matches at the Stade Louis Dugauguez located within the city. Despite finishing 7th in the Championnat National at the end of the 2022–23 season, the club was relegated to the Régional 3 (8th tier) due to financial problems.

== History ==
The club had its best period of success during the 1950s and 1960s. Sedan won the Coupe de France twice, in 1956 and 1961, and spent the entire decade of the 1960s in the top flight.

In 2012, in spite of being on pace to return to the top division, owner Pascal Urano stopped funding the club. CS Sedan finished in the relegation places for the 2012-13 season and declared bankruptcy, ultimately being demoted two divisions instead of one.

In 2023, Sedan achieved promotion to Régional 2, one year after having been administratively relegated from the Championnat National to Régional 3.

== League performance ==
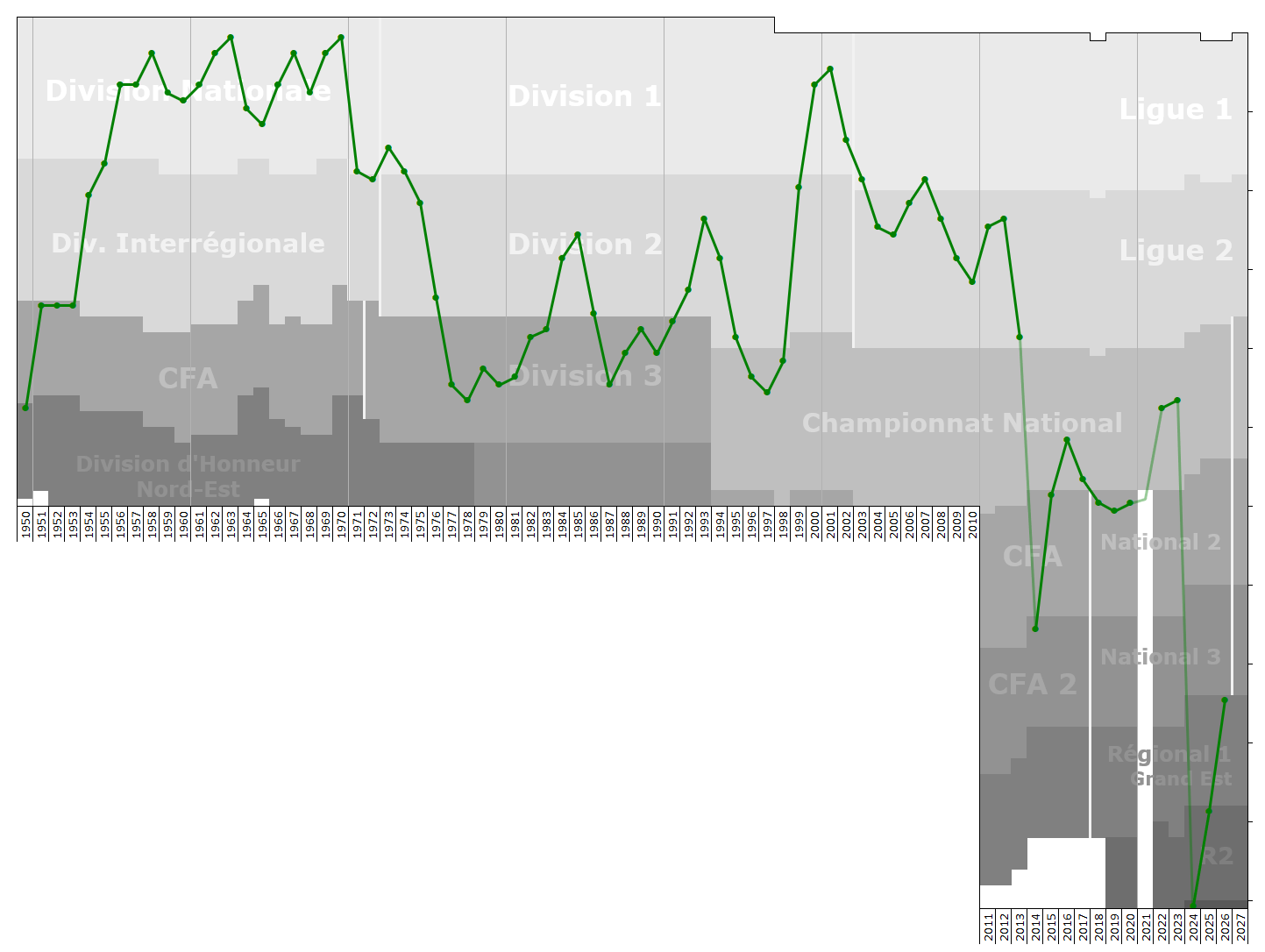
Historical league performance chart of CS Sedan Ardennes

- Ligue 1: 1955–1971, 1972–1974, 1999–2003, 2006–2007
- Ligue 2: 1953–1955, 1971–1972, 1974–1976, 1983–1986, 1991–1995, 1998–1999, 2003–2006, 2007–2013
- Championnat National: 1995–1998, 2015–2017, 2020–2023
- Division 3 (1971–1993): 1976–1983, 1986–1991
- Championnat de France Amateur (1935–1971): 1950–1953
- Championnat National 2: 2014–2015, 2017–2020
- Championnat National 3: 2013–2014
- Régional 1: 2025–present
- Régional 2: 2024–2025
- Régional 3: 2023–2024

== Players ==
=== Retired numbers ===
29 - (France) David Di Tommaso, defender (2000–04) - posthumous honour.

=== Notable players ===
Below are the notable former players who have represented Sedan in league and international competition since the club's foundation in 1919. To appear in the section below, a player must have played in at least 80 official matches for the club or represented the national team for which the player is eligible during his stint with Sedan or following his departure.

For a complete list of CS Sedan Ardennes players, see Category:CS Sedan Ardennes players.

- (Algeria) Mustapha Dahleb
- (Algeria) Nadir Belhadj
- (Algeria) Mohamed Salem
- (Bosnia and Herzegovina) Ivica Osim
- (Cameroon) Modeste M'bami
- (Cameroon) Pius Ndiefi
- (Cameroon) Marcus Mokaké
- (France) Michaël Ciani
- (France) Louis Dugauguez
- (France) Célestin Oliver
- (France) Yves Herbet
- (France) Roger Lemerre
- (Senegal) Henri Camara
- (Senegal) Salif Diao
- (Slovenia) Džoni Novak

== Coaches ==
- Louis Dugauguez (1948–74)
- Christian Perrin (1976–78)
- Yvan Roy (1978–80)
- Pierre Tordo (1980–87)
- Michel Le Flochmoan (1987–94)
- Christian Sarramagna (1994–95)
- Bruno Metsu (1995–98)
- Patrick Remy (1998-00)
- Alex Dupont (2000–01)
- Henri Stambouli (2001–03)
- Dominique Bathenay (2003–2004)
- Serge Romano (2004–06)
- José Pasqualetti (2006–08)
- Landry Chauvin (2008–11)
- Laurent Guyot (2011–13)
- Farid Fouzari (2013–15)
- Roger Lemerre (2016)
- Colbert Marlot (2016)
- Nicolas Usaï (2016–2018)
- Sébastien Tambouret (2018–2020)
- Grégory Poirier (2020)
- Olivier Saragaglia (2021–2023)
- Amadou Kaba (2023–2024)

== Honours ==
- Ligue 2
  - Champions (1): 1955
- Championnat National
  - Champions (1): 1990
- Championnat de France amateur
  - Champions (1): 1951
- Coupe de France
  - Champions (2): 1956, 1961
  - Runners-up (3): 1965, 1999, 2005
- Trophée des champions
  - Champions (1): 1956
  - Runners-up (1): 1961

== Notable supporters ==
- Élise Bussaglia
- Roger Lemerre
