= List of RC Strasbourg Alsace players =

This page lists a selection of RC Strasbourg Alsace players who have achieved sufficient notability according to several criteria which are defined below. For a list of all RC Strasbourg players, major or minor, with a Wikipedia article, see Category:RC Strasbourg Alsace players, and for the current first-team squad, see RC Strasbourg Alsace#Current squad.

== Notable players for the club ==
This is a list of notable footballers who have played for RC Strasbourg from when the club turned professional in 1933 to the present. Generally, this means all players that have played 100 or more first-class matches for the club. However, some players who have played fewer matches are also included. This includes those who have represented their country whilst playing for the club, and players who have set a club playing record, such as goalscoring or transfer fee records.

Players are listed according to the date of their first-team debut for the club. Appearances are for first-team competitive matches only, including substitute appearances, while wartime and cup matches are excluded. Players who captained the club for 10 or more games during a season are included. Statistics are correct as of November 25, 2008.

Club captains who have won a major senior competition (competitions noted in notes section).
Players who represented their country while at the club.
Club record holder.

Name	Nationality	Position	Strasbourg career	Captaincy	Appearances	Goals	Notes
Albert Freyermuth	France	Forward	1921–1935	1933–1934	11	3	
Lucien Halter	France	Midfielder	1929–1932; 1933–1939	1935–1938	188	0	
Fritz Keller	France	Forward	1933–1939	1934–1935	165	74	
Oscar Heisserer	France	Forward	1934–1938; 1945–1949	1945–1949	238	64	
Oskar Rohr	Germany	Forward	1934–1939		150	118	
Alexander Schwartz	Romania	Defender	1936–1938		67	0	
Ernest Waechter	France	Defender	1936–1940; 1945–1947		127	12	
Alphonse Rolland	France	Forward	1945–1948		119	46	
Marcel Lergenmuller	France	Goalkeeper	1945–1949		117	0	
Joseph Lang	France	Midfielder	1945–1949		140	2	
Secundo Pascual	Spain	Defender	1945–1949		159	1	
Paco Mateo	Spain	Defender	1945–1950		118	17	
Frédéric Woehl	France	Forward	1945–1950	1949–1950	148	55	
Aleksandrs Vanags	Latvia	Midfielder	1946–1947; 1949–1954		140	10	
Charles Heiné	France	Forward	1946–1949		94	20	
Lucien Schaeffer	France	Goalkeeper	1947–1953		137	0	
Raymond Krug	France	Forward	1947–1956		211	8	
Edmond Haan	France	Forward	1947–1949; 1950–1961	1951–1952; 1954–1956; 1958	329	76	
François Remetter	France	Goalkeeper	1948; 1960–1964		141	0	
Michel Vavriniak	Poland	Midfielder	1949–1952	1950–1951	93	0	
René Hauss	France	Defender	1949–1967	1962–1967	580	13	
Raymond Kaelbel	France	Defender	1950–1956; 1964–1969		277	11	
Jean Wendling	France	Defender	1951–1956		92	0	
Antoine Hertrich	France	Midfielder	1951–1959		131	38	
Jean-Pierre Kress	France	Goalkeeper	1953–1956		48	0	
Ernst Stojaspal	Austria	Midfielder	1954–1957		115	58	
Louis Schweitzer	France	Midfielder	1955–1961		122	4	
Stéphane Brezniak	France	Midfielder	1956–1959	1958–1969	122	14	
Maurice Visioli	France	Goalkeeper	1957–1960		104	0	
Casimir Koza	France	Forward	1959–1964		161	83	
Pierre Nabat	France	Midfielder	1959–1964		112	7	
Denis Devaux	France	Defender	1959–1966		176	3	
Raymond Stieber	France	Midfielder	1959–1967		245	5	
Robert Jonquet	France	Defender	1960–1962	1960–1962	59	3	
Roland Merschel	France	Midfielder	1960–1962; 1964–1969		216	19	
Gilbert Gress	France	Forward	1960–1966; 1973–1975	1974–1975	257	26	
Gérard Hausser	France	Forward	1960–1967; 1971–1974	1971–1974	317	78	
Michel Leblond	France	Defender	1961–1964		104	3	
Gines Gonzales	France	Defender	1961–1966		108	4	
Pierre Sbaiz	France	Defender	1961–1967		131	0	
Jean Schuth	France	Goalkeeper	1961–1971	1969–1971	277	0	
Ramon Muller	Argentina	Forward	1962–1963; 1966–1968		140	22	
José Farías	Argentina	Forward	1963–1967		138	47	
Marcel Lazarus	France	Midfielder	1965–1973		187	1	
Philippe Piat	France	Forward	1965–1966; 1967–1970		152	48	
Gérard Burcklé	France	Defender	1966–1970		139	2	
José Lopez	Spain	Defender	1966–1970		125	1	
Jean-Noël Huck	France	Midfielder	1968–1971; 1984–1985	1984–1985	118	8	
Dario Grava	France	Defender	1968–1973		151	3	
Marc Molitor	France	Forward	1969–1973		93	43	
René Deutschmann	France	Midfielder	1969–1984		352	14	
Ivica Osim	Yugoslavia	Midfielder	1970–1972; 1976–1978	1976–1977	104	20	
Maurice Serrus	France	Defender	1971–1975		145	1	
Gérald Zamojski	France	Defender	1971–1976		134	0	
Michel Sénéchal	France	Forward	1972–1977		108	12	
Yvan Roy	France	Forward	1972–1975		90	19	
Roland Wagner	France	Forward	1973–1982		201	48	
Giora Spiegel	Israel	Midfielder	1973–1976	1975–1976	107	25	
Jacky Duguépéroux	France	Defender	1973–1979	1977–1979	322	4	
Albert Gemmrich	France	Forward	1973–1979; 1983–1984		253	94	
Dominique Dropsy	France	Goalkeeper	1973–1984	1980–1981	461	1	
Léonard Specht	France	Defender	1973–1982; 1987–1989	1987–1989	372	23	
Yves Ehrlacher	France	Midfielder	1974–1979		202	29	
Joël Tanter	France	Forward	1974–1982		182	18	
Jean-Jacques Marx	France	Defender	1975–1982		248	22	
Jacky Novi	France	Defender	1977–1980	1979–1980	92	1	
Raymond Domenech	France	Defender	1977–1981		146	4	
Francis Piasecki	France	Midfielder	1977–1985	1984–1985	322	64	
Roger Jouve	France	Midfielder	1978–1980		43	0	
Jacques Glassmann	France	Defender	1978–1984		57	3	
Rémy Vogel	France	Midfielder	1978–1987	1985–1987	266	7	
Jean-François Jodar	France	Defender	1979–1984		147	0	
Vicky Peretz	Israel	Forward	1980–1982		81	29	
Serge Jenner	France	Defender	1980–1987; 1990–1992		233	7	
Denis Schaer	France	Forward	1980–1988		184	18	
Didier Six	France	Forward	1980–1981; 1986–1987		33	3	
Carsten Nielsen	Denmark	Forward	1981–1985	1985	120	17	
Jean-Marc Knapp	France	Defender	1981–1987		127	1	
Porfirio Armando Betancourt	Honduras	Forward	1982–1984		38	5	
Vincent Cobos	France	Defender	1982–1991	1989–1991	227	3	
Andrey Zhelyazkov	Bulgaria	Midfielder	1985–1986		27	1	
Marc Andrieux	France	Midfielder	1985–1989		108	7	
Peter Reichert	Germany	Midfielder	1986–1989		108	39	
Jean-Jacques Etamé	France	Midfielder	1986–1988; 1990–1993		121	22	
Cyriaque Didaux	France	Midfielder	1987–1992		128	21	
José Cobos	France	Defender	1987–1993		157	10	
Jean-François Péron	France	Forward	1988–1992		141	12	
Didier Monczuk	France	Forward	1989–1993		105	72	
Sylvain Sansone	France	Goalkeeper	1989–1994		156	0	
Ivan Hasek	Czech Republic	Midfielder	1990–1994		79	27	
Frank Leboeuf	France	Defender	1990–1996	1995–1996	204	40	
Stephen Keshi	Nigeria	Defender	1991–1993		64	9	
Marc Keller	France	Forward	1991–1996		162	35	
Yvon Pouliquen	France	Midfielder	1991–1996	1991–1995	172	4	
Pascal Baills	France	Defender	1992–1995		108	3	
Michael Hughes	Northern Ireland	Midfielder	1992–1994		84	9	
Frank Farina	Australia	Forward	1992–1994		48	14	
Yannick Rott	France	Defender	1993–1998		140	1	
Olivier Dacourt	France	Midfielder	1993–1998		136	4	
David Régis	France	Defender	1993–1996		102	2	
Valérien Ismaël	France	Defender	1993–1998; 2001; 2002–2003		142	3	
Aleksandr Mostovoi	Russia	Midfielder	1994–1996		61	15	
Alexander Vencel	Slovakia	Goalkeeper	1994–2000		199	0	
Gérald Baticle	France	Forward	1995–1998	1996–1998	112	21	
Philippe Raschke	France	Defender	1995–1998		100	2	
David Zitelli	France	Forward	1995–1998; 1999–2000		131	35	
Godwin Okpara	Nigeria	Defender	1996–1999		102	6	
Jan Suchopárek	Czech Republic	Defender	1996–1999		81	1	
Stéphane Collet	France	Midfielder	1996–1999; 2001–2002		117	2	
Seo Jung-Won	South Korea	Forward	1998–1999		18	4	
Corentin Martins	France	Midfielder	1998–1999; 2000–2004	2000–2004	133	16	
Gharib Amzine	Morocco	Midfielder	1998–2001		44	2	
Péguy Luyindula	France	Forward	1998–2001		84	19	
Teddy Bertin	France	Defender	1998–2003	1998–2000	151	23	
Fabrice Ehret	France	Midfielder	1998–2004		124	8	
Habib Beye	Senegal	Defender	1998–2003		133	8	
Akmal Rizal	Malaysia	Forward	1999–2000		22	5	
Mario Haas	Austria	Forward	1999–2001		29	4	
Joseph N'Do	Cameroon	Midfielder	1999–2001		27	0	
Pierre N'Janka	Cameroon	Defender	1999–2003		64	0	
Pascal Camadini	France	Midfielder	1999–2005; 2006–2007		137	4	
Mamadou Bagayoko	Mali	Forward	1999–2003		72	4	
Pascal Johansen	France	Midfielder	2000–2002; 2004–2008		144	6	
Cédric Kanté	Mali	Defender	2000–2001; 2003–2006	2004–2005	96	3	
Danijel Ljuboja	Serbia	Forward	2000–2003		121	34	
Jean-Christophe Devaux	France	Defender	2000–2007		128	1	
Vincent Doukantié	Mali	Midfielder	2000–2002		25	0	
José Luis Chilavert	Paraguay	Goalkeeper	2000–2002		50	0	
Yacine Abdessadki	Morocco	Midfielder	2000–2002; 2003–2005; 2006–2008	2006–2007	128	12	
Christian Bassila	France	Midfielder	2001–2005	2004	89	7	
Guillaume Lacour	France	Midfielder	2002–Present	2005–2006; 2007; 2009–Present	201	2	
Yves Deroff	France	Defender	2002–2007	2006	147	2	
Ulrich Le Pen	France	Forward	2002–2006		105	16	
Václav Drobný	Czech Republic	Defender	2002–2004		42	0	
Eric Mouloungui	Gabon	Forward	2003–2005; 2006–2008		102	17	
Mamadou Niang	Senegal	Forward	2003–2005		56	21	
Pontus Farnerud	Sweden	Forward	2003–2004; 2005–2006		63	3	
Salim Arrache	Algeria	Forward	2003–2006		64	1	
Alexander Farnerud	Sweden	Forward	2003–2006		80	6	
Mickaël Pagis	France	Forward	2004–2006	2005	45	19	
Karim Haggui	Tunisia	Defender	2004–2006		43	2	
Arthur Boka	Ivory Coast	Defender	2004–2006		66	2	
Stéphane Cassard	France	Goalkeeper	2004–Present		162	0	
Sidi Keita	Mali	Midfielder	2004–2006		27	0	
Haykel Gmamdia	Tunisia	Forward	2005–2006		13	0	
Hosni Abd Rabo	Egypt	Midfielder	2005–2006		22	1	
Ahmed Abou Moslem	Egypt	Defender	2006–2007		26	0	
Szilárd Németh	Slovakia	Forward	2006		9	0	
Jeff Strasser	Luxembourg	Defender	2006–2007		26	1	
Wason Rentería	Colombia	Forward	2007–2008		28	9	
Rodrigo	Brazil	Midfielder	2007–2008	2007–2008	34	1	
Grégory Paisley	France	Defender	2007–Present	2008–2009	57	0	
Jacob Mulenga	Zambia	Forward	2007–2008		22	1	
Zoltán Szélesi	Hungary	Defender	2007–Present		38	0	
Mamadou Bah	Guinea	Midfielder	2008–Present		24	0	

- (Cameroon) Joseph Ndo

== Club captains ==
Name	Period
(France) Rémy Vogel	1985–1987
(France) Léonard Specht	1987–1989
(France) Vincent Cobos	1989–1991
(France) Yvon Pouliquen	1991–1995
(France) Franck Lebœuf	1995–1996
(France) Gérald Baticle	1996–1998
(France) Corentin Martins	1998–1999
(France) Teddy Bertin	1999–2000
(France) Corentin Martins	2000–2004
(France) Christian Bassila	2004
(Mali) Cédric Kanté	2004–2005
(France) Mickaël Pagis	2005
(France) Guillaume Lacour	2005–2006

Name	Period
(France) Yves Deroff	2006
(France) Yacine Abdessadki	2006–2007
(France) Guillaume Lacour	2007
(Brazil) Rodrigo	2007–2008
(France) Grégory Paisley	2008–2009
(France) Guillaume Lacour	2009–2010
(Serbia) Milovan Sikimić	2010–2011
(France) Ludovic Golliard	2011–2012
(Serbia) Milovan Sikimić	2012–2014
(Guinea) Ernest Seka	2014–2018
(Serbia) Stefan Mitrović	2018–present

== French internationals ==
Below is a list of all RC Strasbourg players who have been capped for France.

Italics: Formed at RC Strasbourg's academy
*: Still active

World Cup winner

	Name	Position	Caps with Strasbourg	Total Caps
1	Oscar Heisserer	Forward	18	25
2	Dominique Dropsy	Goalkeeper	17	17
3	Léonard Specht	Defender	16	18
4	Gérard Hausser	Forward	14	14
5	Frank Lebœuf	Defender	8	50
6	Fritz Keller	Forward	8	8
7	Jean-Noël Huck	Midfielder	6	17
8	Marc Molitor	Forward	6	10
9	Albert Gemmrich	Forward	5	5
10	Didier Six	Forward	4	52
11	Raymond Kaelbel	Defender	4	35
12	Edmond Haan	Forward	4	4
13	Roger Jouve	Midfielder	3	7
14	Francis Piasecki	Midfielder	3	3
15	Raymond Domenech	Defender	2	8
16	Charles Heiné	Forward	2	2
17	Marc Keller	Forward	1	6
18	Jean-Pierre Kress	Goalkeeper	1	1
19	Casimir Koza	Forward	1	1
20	Denis Devaux	Defender	1	1
21	Roland Wagner	Forward	1	1
22	Youri Djorkaeff	Forward	0	82
23	Robert Jonquet	Defender	0	58
24	Franck Sauzée	Midfielder	0	39
25	François Remetter	Goalkeeper	0	26
26	Jean Wendling	Defender	0	26
27	Olivier Dacourt*	Midfielder	0	21
28	Jacky Novi	Defender	0	20
29	François Bracci	Defender	0	18
30	Olivier Rouyer	Forward	0	17
31	Jean-François Larios	Midfielder	0	17
32	Lucien Muller	Midfielder	0	16
33	Gérard Soler	Midfielder	0	16
34	Corentin Martins	Midfielder	0	14
35	Lucien Laurent	Forward	0	10
36	André Rey	Goalkeeper	0	10
37	Henri Baillot	Forward	0	8
38	René Bihel	Forward	0	6
39	Jean-François Jodar	Defender	0	6
40	Rémi Garde	Midfielder	0	6
41	Martin Djetou	Midfielder	0	6
42	Robert Szczepaniak	Midfielder	0	5
43	Éric Pécout	Forward	0	5
44	Michel Leblond	Midfielder	0	4
45	Xavier Gravelaine	Forward	0	4
46	Péguy Luyindula*	Forward	0	4
47	Henri Skiba	Forward	0	3
48	Gilbert Gress	Forward	0	3
49	Henri Roessler	Defender	0	2
50	François Brisson	Forward	0	2
51	Curt Keller	Forward	0	1
52	Alfred Dambach	Goalkeeper	0	1
53	Bolek Tempowski	Midfielder	0	1
54	Georges Sesia	Forward	0	1
55	Dario Grava	Defender	0	1
56	Jacques Vergnes	Forward	0	1
57	Rémi Vogel	Forward	0	1
58	Pascal Baills	Defender	0	1
59	Jean-Luc Dogon	Defender	0	1
60	Richard Dutruel	Goalkeeper	0	1
