= 1966 Coupe de France final =

- Event: 1965–66 Coupe de France
Strasbourg	Nantes
1	0
- Date: 22 May 1966
- Venue: Parc des Princes, Paris
- Referee: Jean Tricot
- Attendance: 36,285

The 1966 Coupe de France final was a football match held at Stade Olympique Yves-du-Manoir, Colombes on 22 May 1966 that saw RC Strasbourg defeat FC Nantes 1–0 thanks to a goal by Pierre Sbaiz.

== Context ==
This game featured two sharply contrasting styles and became another point in the debate in France at the time between the advocates of zonal marking and man marking. Champions FC Nantes, led by manager José Arribas, practiced the famous "jeu à la nantaise" with a strong emphasis on short passes, technical virtuosity and zonal defense. Strasbourg's strengths, on the contrary, lay more in the physical abilities developed under Paul Frantz's guidance and their counter-attack, relying on the speed of young wingers Gilbert Gress and Gérard Hausser. In addition, the Alsatian team used catenaccio defensive tactics with Denis Devaux as sweeper.

Strasbourg managed to stifle Nantes' offensive power, a task made easier when the Argentinean Ramón Muller was forced to leave the game after 30 minutes due to injury (substitutions were not authorized at that time). Early in the second half, Pierre Sbaiz was able to score from 20 meters after a José Farías free-kick. Strasbourg held on to win their second Coupe de France, which was also the second for captain René Hauss, who accomplished the remarkable feat of winning two cups at the same club with a 15-year interval.

TV reporter Thierry Roland commented that "the Cup [was] leaving France", an assertion that was deemed offensive by many in Alsace. Up to the 1990s, Roland was still booed in Strasbourg for this comment.

== Match details ==
22 May 1966

Strasbourg	1–0	Nantes
Sbaiz 51'

Parc des Princes, Paris
Attendance: 36,285
Referee: Jean Tricot

GK	(France) Johnny Schuth
DF	(France) René Hauss	(c)
DF	(France) Pierre Sbaiz
DF	(France) Raymond Stieber
DF	(France) Denis Devaux
MF	(France) Raymond Kaelbel
MF	(France) Gilbert Gress
MF	(France) Roland Merschel
FW	(Argentina) José Farías
FW	(France) Robert Szczepaniak
FW	(France) Gérard Hausser
Substitutes:
Manager:
(France) Paul Frantz Assistant Referees: Fourth Official:

GK	(France) Daniel Eon	(c)
DF	(France) Georges Grabowski
DF	(France) Gabriel De Michele
DF	(France) Gilbert Le Chenadec
DF	(France) Robert Budzynski
MF	(France) Jean-Claude Suaudeau
MF	(France) Bernard Blanchet
MF	(Argentina) Ramon Muller
FW	(France) Philippe Gondet
FW	(France) Jacques Simon
FW	(Mali) Bassidiki Touré
Substitutes:
Manager:
(France) José Arribas

== See also ==
- 1965–66 Coupe de France
