= List of RC Strasbourg Alsace managers =

This is a list of RC Strasbourg Alsace's managers from 1928, with their records from 1934, the first year the club played in Ligue 1.

== Definition ==
This list contains only the "entraîneurs", i.e. the staff member responsible for first team coaching on a day-to-day basis (including training, tactical choices, team selection for every match and in-game substitutions). In French football, this post is frequently separated from the more general team policy (finances, transfers, scouting, youth development), attributed to a "directeur sportif" or general manager. For example, between 1998 and 1999 Pierre Mankowski was the "entraîneur" responsible for the first team while Claude Le Roy was acting as "manager général" with extensive power on the squad's roster and transfer policy. When Mankowski was sacked, Le Roy replaced him and cumulated both functions as a British manager would do.

== Records ==
Racing has had 46 managers in the professional era, with the holder of the office changing 56 times. This is a record in French football only surpassed by Olympique de Marseille. Gilbert Gress holds the record for the longest-serving manager at the club, both for a single spell (39 months btw. 1977-80, 152 matches) and overall (75 months in two spells, 273 matches). Paul Frantz holds the record for the most spells at Racing with four (73 months overall, 227 matches). Jacky Duguépéroux is the only manager to win two trophies with Strasbourg.

== Complete list ==
Name	Nationality	From	To	P	W	D	L	GF	GA	Win%	Honours
Oscar Bongard	(France)	June 1928	June 1930	?	?	?	?	?	?	?	
Adolphe Riebe	(Austria)	June 1930	June 1932	?	?	?	?	?	?	?	
Louis Neureuther	(Germany)	June 1932	June 1933	?	?	?	?	?	?	?	
Robert Fischer	(France)	June 1933	January 1934	?	?	?	?	?	?	?	
Fritz Kerr	(Austria)	January 1934	June 1935	33	22	5	6	76	38	66.67	
Josef Blum	(Austria)	June 1935	June 1938	101	43	23	29	222	137	42.57	
Charly Rumbold	(Austria)	June 1938	August 1939	30	10	8	12	39	43	33.33	
Karl Bostelaar	(Germany)	June 1941	June 1944	?	?	?	?	?	?	?	
Émile Veinante	(France)	June 1945	June 1947	80	40	14	26	158	120	50	
Kaj Andrup	(Denmark)	June 1947	June 1948	35	13	11	11	83	60	37.14	
Émile Veinante (2)	(France)	June 1948	June 1949	35	10	6	19	41	71	28.57	
Charles Nicolas	(France)	June 1949	April 1952	109	37	24	48	169	216	33.94	1 Coupe de France
Secundo Pascual	(Spain)	April 1952	June 1953	?	?	?	?	?	?	?	
Josip Humpal	(Czechoslovakia)	June 1952	June 1955	76	36	13	27	157	126	47.37	
Oscar Heisserer	(France)	June 1955	March 1956	36	13	16	17	58	68	63.11	
Albert Freyermuth*	(France)	March 1956	June 1956	10	3	3	4	15	24	30	
Jean Avellaneda	(France)	June 1956	June 1957	38	10	9	19	49	77	26.31	
Ferdinand Faczinek	(Czechoslovakia)	June 1956	June 1957	?	?	?	?	?	?	?	
Josip Humpal (2)	(Czechoslovakia)	June 1958	June 1960	79	24	18	37	125	175	30.38	
Émile Veinante (3)	(France)	June 1960	December 1961	66	28	13	25	104	87	42.42	
Robert Jonquet	(France)	December 1961	June 1964	97	32	32	33	134	134	32.99	
Paul Frantz	(France)	July 1964	June 1966	94	37	31	26	147	113	39.36	1 Coupe de France
Walter Presch	(Austria)	June 1966	April 1967	36	18	5	13	54	44	50	
René Hauss	(France)	April 1967	February 1968	36	12	9	15	31	38	33.33	
Paul Frantz (2)	(France)	March 1968	October 1970	105	37	25	43	143	140	35.24	
Paco Mateo	(Spain)	October 1970	February 1971	13	4	3	6	17	20	30.77	
Jelse Csaknady	(Hungary)	February 1971	April 1971	10	2	1	7	10	15	20	
Paul Frantz (3)	(France)	April 1971	June 1971	7	4	0	3	14	13	57.14	
Casimir Nowotarski	(France)	June 1971	November 1973	58	14	16	28	67	103	24.14	
Robert Domergue	(France)	November 1973	June 1974	27	13	7	7	50	38	48.15	
Hennie Hollink	(Netherlands)	June 1974	November 1975	61	24	15	22	81	86	39.34	
Paul Frantz (4)	(France)	November 1975	June 1976	21	6	5	10	25	36	28.57	
Heinz Schilcher	(Austria)	June 1976	November 1976	?	?	?	?	?	?	?	
Alexander Schwartz	(Romania)	November 1976	June 1977	29	19	5	5	66	23	65.51	1 Ligue 2 Championship
Gilbert Gress	(France)	June 1977	September 1980	152	79	37	36	254	159	51.97	1 Ligue 1 Championship
Raymond Hild	(France)	September 1980	November 1981	55	21	17	17	76	59	38.18	
Jürgen Sundermann	(West Germany)	June 1983	March 1985	68	19	25	24	74	82	27.94	
Jean-Noël Huck	(France)	March 1985	December 1985	38	8	13	17	34	59	21.05	
Francis Piasecki	(France)	December 1985	September 1986	27	10	6	11	35	33	37.04	
Robert Herbin	(France)	September 1986	June 1987	35	17	8	10	47	33	48.57	
Henryk Kasperczak	(Poland)	June 1987	September 1988	50	23	13	14	79	47	46	1 Ligue 2 Championship
Jean-Pierre Dogliani*	(France)	September 1988	October 1988	2	0	0	2	1	3	0	
Gérard Banide	(France)	October 1988	August 1989	36	10	12	14	47	52	27.78	
Léonard Specht	(France)	September 1989	June 1991	74	37	18	19	147	89	51.35	
Gilbert Gress (2)	(France)	June 1991	June 1994	121	45	31	31	192	143	37.19	
Daniel Jeandupeux	(Switzerland)	June 1994	March 1995	35	13	11	11	43	41	37.14	
Jacky Duguépéroux	(France)	March 1995	January 1998	146	61	34	51	195	161	41.78	1 Coupe de la Ligue
René Girard	(France)	January 1998	June 1998	11	4	4	3	15	10	36.36	
Pierre Mankowski	(France)	June 1998	November 1999	53	12	21	20	47	64	22.64	
Claude Le Roy	(France)	November 1999	November 2000	42	15	9	18	46	68	35.71	
Yvon Pouliquen	(France)	November 2000	June 2001	24	8	7	9	28	29	33.33	1 Coupe de France
Ivan Hašek	(Czech Republic)	June 2001	June 2003	89	34	26	29	102	97	38.20	
Antoine Kombouaré	(France)	June 2003	October 2004	49	10	18	21	51	68	20.40	
Jacky Duguépéroux (2)	(France)	October 2004	June 2006	87	27	28	31	101	99	31.03	1 Coupe de la Ligue
Jean-Pierre Papin	(France)	June 2006	June 2007	44	23	13	8	64	42	52.27	
Jean-Marc Furlan	(France)	June 2007	June 2009	54	16	14	24	55	72	29.63	
Gilbert Gress (3)	(France)	June 2009	August 2009								
Pascal Janin	(France)	August 2009	2010								
François Keller	(France)	2011	2014								1 CFA Championship
Jacky Duguépéroux (3)	(France)	2014	2016								
Thierry Laurey	(France)	May 2016	May 2021	209	81	51	77	311	302	38.76	1 Coupe de la Ligue
Julien Stéphan	(France)	July 2021	January 2023	58	19	21	18	81	75	32.76	
Frédéric Antonetti	(France)	February 2023	June 2023	15	6	4	5	23	18	40.00	
Patrick Vieira	(France)	June 2023	July 2024	39	14	10	15	38	41	35.90	
Liam Rosenior	(England)	July 2024	January 2026	63	31	15	17	104	78	49.21	
Gary O'Neil	(England)	January 2026	June 2026	27	13	6	8	6	0	100.00	

Key
* Served as caretaker manager.
