= Denis Devaux =

French footballer and manager (1939–2025)

Personal information
- Full name: Denis Aimé Jules Devaux
- Date of birth: 9 January 1939
- Place of birth: Cize, Jura, France
- Date of death: 29 January 2025 (aged 86)
- Place of death: Dole, Jura, France
- Height: 1.80 m (5 ft 11 in)
- Position: Defender

Youth career
- 1953–1955: AS Champagnole

Senior career*
Years	Team	Apps	(Gls)
1955–1959	Racing Besançon	111	(2)
1959–1966	Strasbourg	204	(3)
1966–1967	Stade de Reims	25	(1)
1967–1968	Ajaccio	36	(2)
1968–1969	Racing Besançon	29	(4)
1969–1975	UES Montmorillon		

International career
1965	France	1	(0)

Managerial career
- 1975–1979: UES Montmorillon
- 1981–1982: UES Montmorillon
- 1991–1998: Stade Poitevin
- * Club domestic league appearances and goals

Denis Aimé Jules Devaux (9 January 1939 – 29 January 2025) was a French footballer who played as a defender for Strasbourg and the French national team in the 1960s.

He later worked as a manager, taking charge of Stade Poitevin between 1991 and 1998.

== Playing career ==
=== Club career ===
Born on 9 January 1939 in Cize, Jura, Devaux began his football career in the youth ranks of AS Champagnole in 1953, aged 14, where he remained for two seasons, until 1955, when he joined Racing Besançon, with whom he played for four seasons, until 1959, when he was signed by Strasbourg, remaining there for seven years. Together with Raymond Kaelbel, René Hauss, and Gérard Hausser, Devaux was a member of the great Strasbourg side of the early 1960s that reached the final of the 1961 Coupe Charles Drago, and then won the 1963–64 Coupe de la Ligue and the 1965–66 Coupe de France, after beating Nates 1–0 in the final. In total, he played 216 official matches for Strasbourg.

After leaving Strasbourg in 1966, Devaux played one season each in Stade de Reims (1966–67), Ajaccio (1967–68), and Racing Besançon (1968–69), before settling at UES Montmorillon, with whom he played for six years, until 1975, when he retired at the age of 36. In total, he scored 6 goals in 205 Ligue 1, as well as a further 12 matches in European competitions, mostly in the 1965–66 Inter-Cities Fairs Cup, facing the likes of AC Milan, FC Barcelona, and Manchester United.

=== International career ===
On 24 March 1965, Devaux earned his first (and only) international cap in a friendly match against Austria at the Parc de Princes, which ended in a 2–1 loss.

== Managerial career ==
After his career as a player ended, Devaux remained linked to Montmorillon, now as a coach, which he oversaw between 1975 and 1979, and again in 1981–82. Under his leadership, the Montmorillonnais reached D2 in 1979. After a hiatus of nearly a decade, he returned to the benches in 1991, this time at the helm of Stade Poitevin, a position that he held for seven years, until 1998.

Under his leadership, Stade Poitevin produced some Cup epics, first in the round of 16 of the 1994–95 Coupe de France, knocking out the Monaco of Sonny Anderson and Lilian Thuram (2–1), and then three years later, also in the round of 16, they knocked out Le Havre AC (2–1), and in the next round, they pushed the Girondins de Bordeaux of Jean-Pierre-Papin into extra time in an eventual 4–3 loss.

== Death ==
Devaux died in Dole, Jura on 29 January 2025, at the age of 86.

== Honours ==
Strasbourg

- Coupe Charles Drago:
  - Runner-up (1): 1961
- Coupe de la Ligue:
  - Champions (1): 1963–64
- Coupe de France:
  - Champions (1): 1966
