= 1964–65 Inter-Cities Fairs Cup =

Final positions
- Champions: (Hungary) Ferencváros (1st title)
- Runners-up: (Italy) Juventus

Tournament statistics
- Matches played: 102

The 1964–65 Inter-Cities Fairs Cup was the seventh Inter-Cities Fairs Cup. The competition was won by Ferencváros, who beat Juventus in the final at the Italians' home ground, the Stadio Comunale in Turin. It was only the second time that a Spanish side had not won the competition, and the first of two occasions it went to Eastern Europe.

== Format ==
The entrants, format, and initial draw were announced on 25 June 1964 in Barcelona. The organisers received 77 applications and accepted 48, a surprise increase from 32 the previous season. There were 12 groups of four, with two elimination rounds producing group winners to be drawn subsequently into a third round, two of whose six winners would receive a bye to the semifinals while the other four played quarter finals.

== First round ==
Team 1	Agg.	Team 2	1st leg	2nd leg
KB (Denmark)	4–6	(Netherlands) DOS Utrecht	3–4	1–2
Valencia (Spain)	2–4	(Belgium) RFC Liège	1–1	1–3
Belenenses (Portugal)	1–1	(Republic of Ireland) Shelbourne	1–1	0–0^{1}
Servette FC (Switzerland)	3–8	(Spain) Atlético Madrid	2–2	1–6
Real Betis (Spain)	1–3	(France) Stade Français	1–1	0–2
Union Saint-Gilloise (Belgium)	0–2	(Italy) Juventus	0–1	0–1
Göztepe (Turkey)	1–3	(Romania) Petrolul Ploiești	0–1	1–2
FK Vojvodina (Socialist Federal Republic of Yugoslavia)	2–2	(Bulgaria) Lokomotiv Plovdiv	1–1	1–1^{2}
Basel (Switzerland)	2–1	Spora Luxembourg	2–0	0–1
Strasbourg (France)	2–1	(Italy) Milan	2–0	0–1
Barcelona (Spain)	2–1	(Italy) Fiorentina	0–1	2–0
Leixões (Portugal)	1–4	(Scotland) Celtic	1–1	0–3
Borussia Dortmund (West Germany)	4–3	(France) Bordeaux	4–1	0–2
Djurgården (Sweden)	2–7	(England) Manchester United	1–1	1–6
Eintracht Frankfurt (West Germany)	4–5	(Scotland) Kilmarnock	3–0	1–5
Vålerenga (Norway)	4–9	(England) Everton	2–5	2–4
NK Zagreb (Socialist Federal Republic of Yugoslavia)	9–2	(Austria) GAK	3–2	6–0
Aris (Greece)	0–3	(Italy) Roma	0–0	0–3
Wiener Sport-Club (Austria)	3–1	(East Germany) SC Leipzig	2–1	1–0
Ferencváros (Hungary)	2–1	(Czechoslovakia) Spartak Brno	2–0	0–1
Athletic Bilbao (Spain)	4–2	(Socialist Federal Republic of Yugoslavia) OFK Beograd	2–2	2–0
Hertha BSC (West Germany)	2–3	(Belgium) Royal Antwerp	2–1	0–2
Dunfermline Athletic (Scotland)	4–2	(Sweden) Örgryte	4–2	0–0
B 1913 (Denmark)	1–4	(West Germany) Stuttgart	1–3	0–1

^{1}Shelbourne progressed to the next round after winning a play-off match 2–1.
^{2}Lokomotiv Plovdiv progressed to the next round after winning a play-off match 2–0.

=== First leg ===
23 September 1964

Union Saint-Gilloise (Belgium)	0–1	(Italy) Juventus
		Combin 35'

Stade Joseph Marien Brussels

9 September 1964

Göztepe (Turkey)	0–1	(Romania) Petrolul Ploiești
	Report	Dridea 22'

İzmir Alsancak, İzmir
Attendance: 8,500
Referee: Faruk Talu (Turkey)

9 September 1964

Basel (Switzerland)	2–0	Spora Luxembourg
Crava 14', 66'

St. Jakob Stadium, Basel

9 September 1964

Strasbourg (France)	2–0	(Italy) Milan
Merschel 76'; Hausser 87'

Stade de la Meinau, Strasbourg
Attendance: 14,800
Referee: Gottfried Dienst (Switzerland)

23 September 1964

Barcelona (Spain)	0–1	(Italy) Fiorentina
		Hamrin 27'

Camp Nou, Barcelona
Attendance: 30,000
Referee: Marcel Bois (France)

23 September 1964

Leixões (Portugal)	1–1	(Scotland) Celtic F.C.
Esteves 6'		Murdoch 31'

Estádio do Mar, Matosinhos
Attendance: 10,000
Referee: Joseph Barbéran (France)

23 September 1964

Djurgården (Sweden)	1–1	(England) Manchester United
B. Johansson 8'		Herd 87'

Olympic Stadium, Stockholm
Attendance: 6,537

16 September 1964

Aris (Greece)	0–0	(Italy) Roma
	Report

Thessaloniki

16 September 1964

Belenenses (Portugal)	1–1	(Republic of Ireland) Shelbourne
Palico 62'	Report	Barber 80'

Estádio do Restelo, Lisbon
Attendance: 6,500
Referee: José Ruiz Casasola (Spain)

9 September 1964

Ferencváros (Hungary)	2–0	(Czechoslovakia) Spartak Brno
Varga 10'; Florian Albert 20'

Népstadion, Budapest
Attendance: 45 000
Referee: Kizukalis (Greece)

=== Second leg ===
7 October 1964

Juventus (Italy)	1–0	(Belgium) Union Saint-Gilloise
Menichelli 18'

Stadio Comunale, Turin

Juventus won 2–0 on aggregate.

23 September 1964

Petrolul Ploiești (Romania)	2–1	(Turkey) Göztepe
Mocanu 5'; Dridea 40'	Report	Yayöz 62'

Stadionul Petrolul, Ploiești
Attendance: 3,300
Referee: Mihai Popa (Romania)

Petrolul Ploiești won 3–1 on aggregate.

8 October 1964

Spora Luxembourg	1–0	(Switzerland) Basel
Joseph Krier 20'

Stade Josy Barthel, Luxembourg

Basel won 2–1 on aggregate.

30 September 1964

Milan (Italy)	1–0	(France) Strasbourg
Ferrario 9'

San Siro, Milan
Attendance: 27,800
Referee: Stjepan Varaždinec (Yugoslavia)

Strasbourg won 2–1 on aggregate.

7 October 1964

Fiorentina (Italy)	0–2	(Spain) Barcelona
		Seminario 8' 60'

Stadio Comunale, Florence
Attendance: 20,000
Referee: Branko Tešanić (Yugoslavia)

Barcelona won 2–1 on aggregate.

7 October 1964

Celtic F.C. (Scotland)	3–0	(Portugal) Leixões
Chalmers 14', 83'; Murdoch 88' (pen.)

Celtic Park, Glasgow
Attendance: 30,000
Referee: Ernest Crawford (England)

Celtic won 4–1 on aggregate.

14 October 1964

(Republic of Ireland) Shelbourne	0–0	Belenenses (Portugal)
	Report

Dalymount Park, Dublin
Attendance: 12,900
Referee: Jack Lowry (Wales)

Aggregate 1–1.

27 October 1964

Manchester United (England)	6–1	(Sweden) Djurgården
Law 21', 68', 69' (pen.); Charlton 63', 73'; Best 86'		H. Karlsson 89'

Old Trafford, Manchester
Attendance: 38,437

Manchester United won 7–2 on aggregate.

30 September 1964

Roma (Italy)	3–0	(Greece) Aris
Tamborini 58'; Schnellinger 69'; Leonardi 71'	Report

Stadio Olimpico, Rome

Roma won 3–0 on aggregate.

16 September 1964

Spartak Brno (Czechoslovakia)	1–0	(Hungary) Ferencváros
Vojta 24'

Za Lužánkami, Brno
Attendance: 10 000
Referee: Comsa (Romania)

Ferencváros won 2–1 on aggregate.

=== Play-off ===
28 October 1964

(Republic of Ireland) Shelbourne	2–1	Belenenses (Portugal)
Hannigan 5'; Conroy 25'	Report	Teodora 35'

Dalymount Park, Dublin
Attendance: 14,400
Referee: Jack Lowry (Wales)

Shelbourne won 3-2 on aggregate.

== Second round ==
Team 1	Agg.	Team 2	1st leg	2nd leg
DOS Utrecht (Netherlands)	0–4	(Belgium) RFC Liège	0–2	0–2
Shelbourne (Republic of Ireland)	0–2	(Spain) Atlético Madrid	0–1	0–1
Stade Français (France)	0–1	(Italy) Juventus	0–0	0–1
Petrolul Ploiești (Romania)	1–2	(Bulgaria) Lokomotiv Plovdiv	1–0	0–2
Basel (Switzerland)	2–6	(France) Strasbourg	0–1	2–5
Barcelona (Spain)	3–1	(Scotland) Celtic	3–1	0–0
Borussia Dortmund (West Germany)	1–10	(England) Manchester United	1–6	0–4
Kilmarnock (Scotland)	1–6	(England) Everton	0–2	1–4
NK Zagreb (Socialist Federal Republic of Yugoslavia)	1–2	(Italy) Roma	1–1	0–1
Wiener Sport-Club (Austria)	2–2	(Hungary) Ferencváros	1–0	1–2^{1}
Athletic Bilbao (Spain)	3–0	(Belgium) Royal Antwerp	2–0	1–0
Dunfermline Athletic (Scotland)	1–0	(West Germany) Stuttgart	1–0	0–0

^{1}Ferencváros progressed to the next round after winning a play-off match 2–0.

=== First leg ===
28 October 1964

Stade Français (France)	0–0	(Italy) Juventus

Haras Lupine, Paris

3 November 1964

Basel (Switzerland)	0–1	(France) Strasbourg
		Gress 51'

11 November 1964
Second round

Petrolul Ploiești (Romania)	1–0	(Bulgaria) Lokomotiv Plovdiv
Dridea 66' (pen.)	Report

Stadionul Petrolul, Ploiești
Attendance: 3,000
Referee: György Müncz (Hungary)

25 November 1964

Shelbourne (Republic of Ireland)	0–1	(Spain) Atlético Madrid
		Cardona 71'

Dalymount Park, Dublin
Attendance: 19,800
Referee: William Syme (Scotland)

11 November 1964

Borussia Dortmund (West Germany)	1–6	(England) Manchester United
Kurrat 52' (pen.)		Herd 12'; Charlton 30', 79', 85'; Best 49'; Law 77'

Stadion Rote Erde, Dortmund
Attendance: 25,000

28 October 1964

NK Zagreb (Socialist Federal Republic of Yugoslavia)	1–1	(Italy) Roma
Beslać 6'		Nicolè 52'

Stadion Maksimir, Zagreb

The NK Zagreb – Roma match came close to being cancelled due to the 1964 Zagreb flood. Proceeds from the ticket sales were donated toward the flood recovery efforts.

=== Second leg ===
2 December 1964

Juventus (Italy)	1–0	(France) Stade Français
da Costa 49'

Stadio Comunale, Turin

Juventus won 1–0 on aggregate.

2 December 1964

Lokomotiv Plovdiv (Bulgaria)	2–0	(Romania) Petrolul Ploiești
Manolov 33' (pen.); Kolev 85'	Report

Stadion Deveti septemvri, Plovdiv
Attendance: 6,200
Referee: Nejat Şener (Turkey)

Lokomotiv Plovdiv won 2–1 on aggregate.

11 November 1964

Strasbourg (France)	5–2	(Switzerland) Basel
Farías 13'; Sbaiz 21'; Hausser 28', 52'; Szczepaniak 83'		Frigerio 22' (pen.); Blumer 35'

Strasbourg won 6–2 on aggregate.

2 December 1964

Manchester United (England)	4–0	(West Germany) Borussia Dortmund
Charlton 1', 19'; Law 68'; Connelly 80'

Old Trafford, Manchester
Attendance: 31,896

Manchester United won 10–1 on aggregate.

25 November 1964

Roma (Italy)	1–0	(Socialist Federal Republic of Yugoslavia) NK Zagreb
Angelillo 83'

Stadio Olimpico, Rome

Roma won 2–1 on aggregate.

2 December 1964

(Spain) Atlético Madrid	1–0	Shelbourne (Republic of Ireland)
Adelardo 85'	Report

Estadio Metropolitano de Madrid, Madrid
Attendance: 10,800
Referee: Pierre Schwinte (France)

Atlético won 2–0 on aggregate.

== Third round ==
The draw for the third round was made in Rome on 3 December 1964.

Team #1	Agg.	Team #2	1st leg	2nd leg	Playoff
RFC Liège (Belgium)	1–2	(Spain) Atlético Madrid	1–0	0–2
Juventus (Italy)	2–2	(Bulgaria) Lokomotiv Plovdiv	1–1	1–1	2–1(aet)
Strasbourg (France)	2–2	(Spain) Barcelona	0–0	2–2	0–0 (aet (c))
Manchester United (England)	3–2	(England) Everton	1–1	2–1
Roma (Italy)	1–3	(Hungary) Ferencváros	1–2	0–1
Athletic Bilbao (Spain)	1–1	(Scotland) Dunfermline Athletic	1–0	0–1	2–1

=== First leg ===
17 February 1965

Juventus (Italy)	1–1	(Bulgaria) Lokomotiv Plovdiv
Menichelli 36'		Muletarov 61'

Stadio Comunale, Turin

20 January 1965
19:30

Strasbourg (France)	0–0	(Spain) Barcelona
	Report

Stade de la Meinau, Strasbourg
Attendance: 18,000
Referee: Pieter Roomer (Netherlands)

20 January 1965

Manchester United (England)	1–1	(England) Everton
Connelly 33'		Pickering 14'

Old Trafford, Manchester
Attendance: 50,000

10 March 1965

Roma (Italy)	1–2	(Hungary) Ferencváros
De Sisti 81'		Rátkai 37'; M. Fenyvesi 79'

Stadio Olimpico, Rome

=== Second leg ===
10 March 1965

Lokomotiv Plovdiv (Bulgaria)	1–1	(Italy) Juventus
Manolov 4'		Mazzia 44'

Plovdiv Stadium, Plovdiv
Attendance: 40,000
Referee: Vasile Dumitrescu (Romania)

Lokomotiv Plovdiv 2–2 Juventus on aggregate.

10 February 1965
20:45

Barcelona (Spain)	2–2	(France) Strasbourg
Benítez 57'; Seminario 89'	Report	Hausser 15'; Farías 67'

Camp Nou, Barcelona
Attendance: 40,000
Referee: Vital Loraux (Belgium)
18 March 1965
22:30

Barcelona (Spain)	0–0	(France) Strasbourg
	Report

Camp Nou, Barcelona
Attendance: 30,000
Referee: Concetto Lo Bello (Italy)

Strasbourg won on coin toss.

14 April 1965

Juventus (Italy)	2–1 (a.e.t)	(Bulgaria) Lokomotiv Plovdiv
Sívori 23' 101'		Kanchev 17'

Stadio Comunale, Turin

Juventus won 2–1 in play-off.

9 February 1965

Everton (England)	1–2	(England) Manchester United
Pickering 55'		Connelly 6'; Herd 69'

Goodison Park, Liverpool
Attendance: 54,397

Manchester United won 3–2 on aggregate.

16 March 1965

Ferencváros (Hungary)	1–0	(Italy) Roma
Albert 42'

Nepstadion, Budapest

Ferencváros won 3–1 on aggregate.

== Quarter-finals ==
Team 1	Agg.	Team 2	1st leg	2nd leg
Atlético Madrid (Spain)	Bye		–	–
Juventus (Italy)	Bye		–	–
Strasbourg (France)	0–5	(England) Manchester United	0–5	0–0
Ferencváros (Hungary)	2–2	(Spain) Athletic Bilbao	1–0	1–2^{1}

^{1}Ferencváros progressed to the next round after winning a play-off match 3–0.

=== First leg ===
12 May 1965

Strasbourg (France)	0–5	(England) Manchester United
		Connelly 20'; Herd 40'; Law 61', 89'; Charlton 73'

Strasbourg
Attendance: 30,000

=== Second leg ===
19 May 1965

Manchester United (England)	0–0	(France) Strasbourg

Old Trafford, Manchester
Attendance: 34,188

Manchester United won 5–0 on aggregate.

== Semi-finals ==
Team 1	Agg.	Team 2	1st leg	2nd leg
Atlético Madrid (Spain)	4–4	(Italy) Juventus	3–1	1–3^{1}
Manchester United (England)	3–3	(Hungary) Ferencváros	3–2	0–1^{2}

^{1}Juventus progressed to the next round after winning a play-off match 3–1.
^{2}Ferencváros progressed to the next round after winning a play-off match 2–1.

=== First leg ===
19 May 1965

Atlético Madrid (Spain)	3–1	(Italy) Juventus
Luis Aragonés 47' (pen.) 52' 61'		Combin 43'

Estadio Metropolitano de Madrid, Madrid
Attendance: 50,000
Referee: Albert Guinnard (Switzerland)

31 May 1965

Manchester United (England)	3–2	(Hungary) Ferencváros
Law 34' (pen.); Herd 61', 69'		Novák 23'; Rákosi 76'

Old Trafford, Manchester
Attendance: 39,902

=== Second leg ===
26 May 1965

Juventus (Italy)	3–1	(Spain) Atlético Madrid
Menichelli 50'; Combin 52'; Bercellino 57'		Luis Aragonés 83'

Stadio Comunale, Turin
Attendance: 15,000
Referee: Jim Finney (England)

Juventus 4–4 Atlético Madrid on aggregate.

3 June 1965

Juventus (Italy)	3–1	(Spain) Atlético Madrid
Stacchini 35'; Calleja 76' (o.g.); Salvadore 82'		Mendonça 13'

Stadio Comunale, Turin
Attendance: 15,000
Referee: Joseph Heymann (Switzerland)

Juventus won 3–1 in play-off.

6 June 1965

Ferencváros (Hungary)	1–0	(England) Manchester United
Novák 44' (pen.)

Nepstadion, Budapest
Attendance: 50,000

Ferencváros 3–3 Manchester United on aggregate.

16 June 1965

Ferencváros (Hungary)	2–1	(England) Manchester United
Karába 44'; Fenyvesi 54'		Connelly 86'

Nepstadion, Budapest
Attendance: 60,000

Ferencváros won 2–1 in play-off.

== Final ==
23 June 1965

Juventus (Italy)	0–1	(Hungary) Ferencváros
		Fenyvesi 74'

Stadio Comunale, Turin
Attendance: 30,000
Referee: Gottfried Dienst (Switzerland)
