= 2009–10 RC Strasbourg season =

Strasbourg
2009–10 season
- President: Léonard Specht; Philippe Ginestet; Julien Fournier; Jean-Claude Plessis
- Head coach: Gilbert Gress; Pascal Janin
- Stadium: Stade de la Meinau
- Ligue 2: 19th (relegated)
- Coupe de France: Round of 64
- Coupe de la Ligue: First round
- Top goalscorer: League: Nicolas Fauvergue (13); All: Nicolas Fauvergue (15)
- Average home league attendance: 11,334
Home colours	Away colours	Third colours

The 2009–10 season was the 104th season in the existence of RC Strasbourg and the club's second and last consecutive season in the second division of French football. In addition to the domestic league, Strasbourg participated in this season's edition of the Coupe de France and the Coupe de la Ligue. The season covered the period from 1 July 2009 to 30 June 2010.

== Competitions ==
=== Overall record ===
Competition	First match	Last match	Starting round	Final position	Record							
Competition	First match	Last match	Starting round	Final position	Pld	W	D	L	GF	GA	GD	Win %
Ligue 1	7 August 2009	14 May 2010	Matchday 1	19th	38	9	15	14	42	49	−7	23.68
Coupe de France	21 November 2009	9 January 2010	Seventh round	Round of 64	1	0	0	1	7	4	+3	0.00
Coupe de la Ligue	1 August 2009		First round	First round	1	0	0	1	1	6	−5	0.00
Total					40	9	15	16	50	59	−9	22.50

Source: Competitions

=== Ligue 2 ===
==== League table ====
Pos	Team	Pld	W	D	L	GF	GA	GD	Pts	Promotion or Relegation
16	Châteauroux	38	10	14	14	50	54	−4	44	
17	Istres	38	11	11	16	34	52	−18	44	
18	Guingamp (R)	38	9	16	13	35	40	−5	43	Originally relegated to 2010-11 Championnat de France Amateur but instead relegated to Championnat National (Note: On 15 June 2010, following a review of each club's administrative and financial accounts in the Championnat National, the DNCG ruled that both Bastia and Gueugnon would be relegated to the Championnat de France amateur, while Amiens, Guingamp, and Strasbourg were having its accounts subjected to further deliberation to determine whether each club could retain its professional status. Both Bastia and Gueugnon had the option to appeal the decision. On 25 June 2010, the Corsican Assembly and the General Council of Haute-Corse approved grants of €800,000 and €150,000 to be given to Bastia in order for the club to meet the DNCG's financial requirements, which would allow the club to remain in the Championnat National. However, on 6 July, the DNCG remained firm on its stance relegating the club to the fourth division after questioning the legitimacy of the grants and the sale of the club's training center. Bastia president, Julien Lolli, remained confident that the club would play in the Championnat National and issued an appeal to the CNOSF, the National Sporting Committee of France, the same day. On 2 July, the DNCG announced that Gueugnon would remain in National after the club successfully appealed to the organisation. On 16 July, the CNOSF ruled against the DNCG and announced that Bastia should play in the Championnat National. The club's place in the league was confirmed upon the release of the league table. On 2 July, local media in Alsace reported that Strasbourg were on the verge of being relegated to the Championnat de France amateur by the DNCG due to financial issues. The club responded by announcing its willingness to appeal if the news reported was confirmed. With the club's accounts still being reviewed, Strasbourg's financial issues were slightly alleviated after the sale of striker Magaye Gueye to English club Everton for €1.4 million. Strasbourg later transferred captain Guillaume Lacour and Algerian international Yacine Bezzaz to Évian and Troyes, respectively, for nominal fees. On 16 July, the report was confirmed when the DNCG officially relegated Strasbourg to the CFA. Strasbourg appealed the decision the following week. On 22 July, Strasbourg's appeal was successful with the DNCG ruling in favour of a return to National. The return of Strasbourg to National means that twenty-one clubs competed in the 2010–11 edition of the league.)
19	Strasbourg (R)	38	9	15	14	42	49	−7	42	Originally relegated to 2010-11 Championnat de France Amateur but instead relegated to Championnat National
20	Bastia (R)	38	10	9	19	40	48	−8	39	Originally relegated to 2010-11 Championnat de France Amateur but instead relegated to Championnat National

Source: Ligue 2
Rules for classification: 1) points; 2) goal difference; 3) number of goals scored.
(R) Relegated

==== Results summary ====
Overall								Home						Away					
Pld	W	D	L	GF	GA	GD	Pts	W	D	L	GF	GA	GD	W	D	L	GF	GA	GD
38	9	15	14	42	49	−7	42	9	7	3	29	18	+11	0	8	11	13	31	−18

Last updated: 14 May 2010.
Source: Ligue 2

==== Results by round ====
Round	1	2	3	4	5	6	7	8	9	10	11	12	13	14	15	16	17	18	19	20	21	22	23	24	25	26	27	28	29	30	31	32	33	34	35	36	37	38
Ground	H	A	H	A	H	A	A	H	A	H	A	H	A	H	A	H	A	H	A	H	A	H	A	H	H	A	H	A	H	A	H	A	H	A	H	A	H	A
Result	L	L	D	D	D	L	L	D	D	W	D	L	L	W	D	W	L	W	L	W	D	W	D	W	D	D	L	D	W	L	D	L	W	L	D	L	D	L
Position	14	18	17	18	18	19	20	20	20	19	19	20	20	19	19	18	19	18	18	17	16	14	14	13	13	12	13	14	13	15	15	15	14	15	15	17	17	19

Source: Ligue 2
A = Away; H = Home; W = Win; D = Draw; L = Loss

==== Matches ====
7 August 2009 1	Strasbourg	1–2	Châteauroux	Strasbourg
--:-- CEST (UTC+2)				Stadium: Stade de la Meinau

13 August 2009 2	Laval	3–2	Strasbourg	Laval
--:-- CEST (UTC+2)				Stadium: Stade Francis Le Basser

18 August 2009 3	Strasbourg	1–1	Arles-Avignon	Strasbourg
--:-- CEST (UTC+2)				Stadium: Stade de la Meinau

21 August 2009 4	Ajaccio	2–2	Strasbourg	Ajaccio
--:-- CEST (UTC+2)				Stadium: Stade François Coty

28 August 2009 5	Strasbourg	2–2	Sedan	Strasbourg
--:-- CEST (UTC+2)				Stadium: Stade de la Meinau

14 September 2009 6	Nantes	2–1	Strasbourg	Nantes
--:-- CEST (UTC+2)				Stadium: Stade de la Beaujoire

18 September 2009 7	Clermont	3–0	Strasbourg	Clermont-Ferrand
--:-- CEST (UTC+2)				Stadium: Stade Gabriel Montpied

28 September 2009 8	Strasbourg	2–2	Caen	Strasbourg
--:-- CEST (UTC+2)				Stadium: Stade de la Meinau

2 October 2009 9	Angers	0–0	Strasbourg	Angers
--:-- CEST (UTC+2)				Stadium: Stade Raymond Kopa

16 October 2009 10	Strasbourg	1–0	Vannes	Strasbourg
--:-- CEST (UTC+2)				Stadium: Stade de la Meinau

23 October 2009 11	Brest	1–1	Strasbourg	Brest
--:-- CEST (UTC+2)				Stadium: Stade Francis-Le Blé

27 October 2009 12	Strasbourg	0–1	Tours	Strasbourg
--:-- CET (UTC+1)				Stadium: Stade de la Meinau

30 October 2009 13	Metz	1–0	Strasbourg	Metz
--:-- CET (UTC+1)				Stadium: Stade Saint-Symphorien

6 November 2009 14	Strasbourg	2–0	Istres	Strasbourg
--:-- CET (UTC+1)				Stadium: Stade de la Meinau

27 November 2009 15	Dijon	0–0	Strasbourg	Dijon
--:-- CET (UTC+1)				Stadium: Stade Gaston Gérard

1 December 2009 16	Strasbourg	2–1	Bastia	Strasbourg
--:-- CET (UTC+1)				Stadium: Stade de la Meinau

4 December 2009 17	Nîmes	2–1	Strasbourg	Nîmes
--:-- CET (UTC+1)				Stadium: Stade des Costières

18 December 2009 18	Strasbourg	2–1	Guingamp	Strasbourg
--:-- CET (UTC+1)				Stadium: Stade de la Meinau

22 December 2009 19	Le Havre	3–0	Strasbourg	Le Havre
--:-- CET (UTC+1)				Stadium: Stade Jules Deschaseaux

15 January 2010 20	Strasbourg	4–1	Laval	Strasbourg
--:-- CET (UTC+1)				Stadium: Stade de la Meinau

19 January 2010 21	Arles-Avignon	1–1	Strasbourg	Avignon
--:-- CET (UTC+1)				Stadium: Parc des Sports

29 January 2010 22	Strasbourg	2–0	Ajaccio	Strasbourg
--:-- CET (UTC+1)				Stadium: Stade de la Meinau

5 February 2010 23	Sedan	3–3	Strasbourg	Sedan
--:-- CET (UTC+1)				Stadium: Stade Louis Dugauguez

15 February 2010 24	Strasbourg	1–0	Nantes	Strasbourg
--:-- CET (UTC+1)				Stadium: Stade de la Meinau

19 February 2010 25	Strasbourg	1–1	Clermont	Strasbourg
--:-- CET (UTC+1)				Stadium: Stade de la Meinau

26 February 2010 26	Caen	0–0	Strasbourg	Caen
--:-- CET (UTC+1)				Stadium: Stade Michel d'Ornano

5 March 2010 27	Strasbourg	1–2	Angers	Strasbourg
--:-- CET (UTC+1)				Stadium: Stade de la Meinau

12 March 2010 28	Vannes	1–1	Strasbourg	Vannes
--:-- CET (UTC+1)				Stadium: Stade de la Rabine

19 March 2010 29	Strasbourg	1–0	Brest	Strasbourg
--:-- CET (UTC+1)				Stadium: Stade de la Meinau

26 March 2010 30	Tours	2–0	Strasbourg	Tours
--:-- CET (UTC+1)				Stadium: Stade de la Vallée du Cher

5 April 2010 31	Strasbourg	1–1	Metz	Strasbourg
--:-- CEST (UTC+2)				Stadium: Stade de la Meinau

9 April 2010 32	Istres	2–0	Strasbourg	Fos-sur-Mer
--:-- CEST (UTC+2)				Stadium: Stade Parsemain

16 April 2010 33	Strasbourg	3–1	Dijon	Strasbourg
--:-- CEST (UTC+2)				Stadium: Stade de la Meinau

23 April 2010 34	Bastia	1–0	Strasbourg	Furiani
--:-- CEST (UTC+2)				Stadium: Stade Armand Cesari

30 April 2010 35	Strasbourg	1–1	Nîmes	Strasbourg
--:-- CEST (UTC+2)				Stadium: Stade de la Meinau

4 May 2010 36	Guingamp	2–0	Strasbourg	Guingamp
--:-- CEST (UTC+2)				Stadium: Stade de Roudourou

7 May 2010 37	Strasbourg	1–1	Le Havre	Strasbourg
--:-- CEST (UTC+2)				Stadium: Stade de la Meinau

14 May 2010 38	Châteauroux	2–1	Strasbourg	Châteauroux
--:-- CEST (UTC+2)				Stadium: Stade Gaston-Petit

=== Coupe de France ===
21 November 2009 Seventh round	Biesheim	1–3	Strasbourg	Biesheim
--:-- CET (UTC+1)				Stadium: Stade du Giessen

13 December 2009 Eighth round	Strasbourg	3–0	Thionville	Strasbourg
--:-- CET (UTC+1)				Stadium: Stade de la Meinau

9 January 2010 Round of 64	Strasbourg	1–3	Lyon	Strasbourg
--:-- CET (UTC+1)				Stadium: Stade de la Meinau

=== Coupe de la Ligue ===
1 August 2009 First round	Istres	6–1	Strasbourg	Fos-sur-Mer
--:-- CEST (UTC+2)				Stadium: Stade Parsemain
