= Raymond Stieber =

French footballer (1936–2025)

Personal information
- Date of birth: 2 April 1936
- Place of birth: Strasbourg, France
- Date of death: 15 July 2025 (aged 89)
- Height: 1.78 m (5 ft 10 in)
- Positions: Defender; midfielder

Senior career*
Years	Team	Apps	(Gls)
1959–1967	Strasbourg	273	(6)
Total		273	(6)
- * Club domestic league appearances and goals

Raymond Stieber (2 April 1936 – 15 July 2025) was a French footballer who played as a defender and midfielder.

Stieber played professionally for Strasbourg from 1959 to 1967, winning the Coupe de la Ligue in 1964 and the Coupe de France in 1966.

Stieber died on 15 July 2025, at the age of 89.
