= Paul Frantz =

French football manager (1927–2016)

Personal information
- Date of birth: 10 March 1927
- Place of birth: Wittisheim, France
- Date of death: 30 September 2016 (aged 89)

Senior career*
Years	Team	Apps	(Gls)
1946–1947	Dornach Mulhouse		
–	Mulhouse		
1954–1961	Wittisheim		

Managerial career
- 1953–1961: Wittisheim (player-manager)
- 1961–1962: Mutzig
- 1964–1966: Strasbourg
- 1966–1967: Karlsruher SC
- 1968–1971: Strasbourg
- 1974–1975: Mulhouse
- 1975–1976: Strasbourg
- * Club domestic league appearances and goals

Paul Frantz (10 March 1927 – 30 September 2016) was a French football player and manager.

== Career ==
A physical education teacher, he never played as a professional, a fact that did not prevent him from earning his 3rd level manager degree – necessary to coach pro teams in France – as valedictorian in 1958. He was the first manager with no experience as a pro player to do that. After several spells with amateur teams, he was named manager of RC Strasbourg in 1964.

He led the Strasbourg team to a good run in the Inter-Cities Fairs cup in 1964–1965 ousting AC Milan and FC Barcelona before falling to Manchester United in the quarter-finals. A year later, he led the Strasbourg side to victory in the Coupe de France, defeating FC Nantes 1–0.

The following season, he was in charge of Karlsruher SC and he remains to this date the only French to ever coach a Bundesliga team. Back at Strasbourg in 1968, he occupied several positions including manager of the first team and director of football until 1976. In 1968 as well, he turned down an offer to be manager of the National Team. He also managed FC Mulhouse in 1974.

== Impact on training in France ==
Frantz is also renowned for his talents as a coaching trainer and is considered to be one of the iniators of the "scientific approach" to training in France. He was among the first to emphasize physical training and to introduce the use of body-building. During the 1970s he was responsible of the formation organized for aspiring pro managers by the Fédération Française de Football, where he taught the likes of Aimé Jacquet, Roger Lemerre and Guy Roux. In Alsace, he also was influential in Arsène Wenger's development as a manager. In 2001, he was the recipient of the "Trophée Georges Boulogne" to honour his achievements as an educator and trainer.

== Death ==
Frantz died on 30 September 2016, at the age of 89.
