= Cize, Jura =

Commune in Bourgogne-Franche-Comté, France

Cize
- Commune
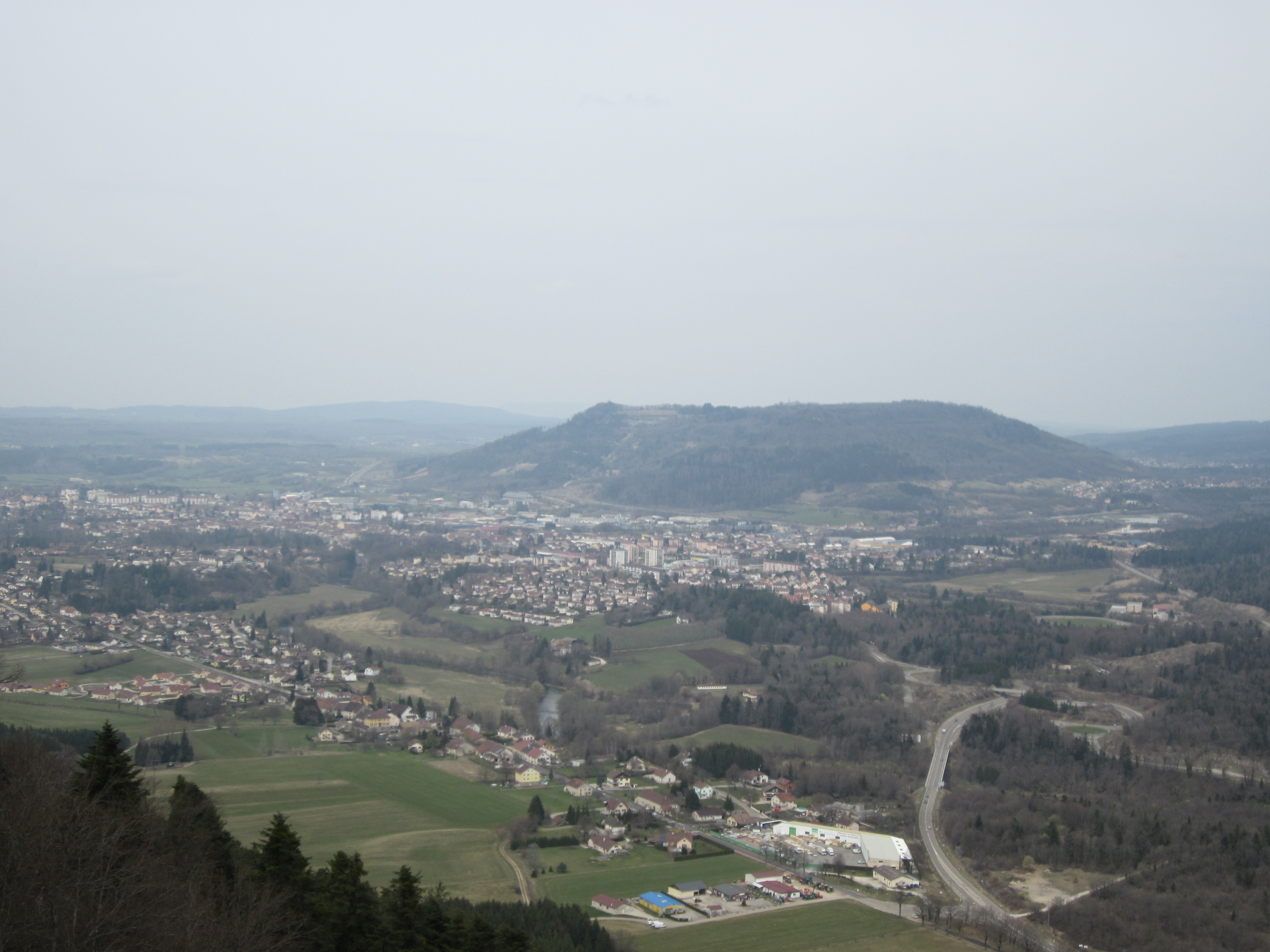
- A general view of Cize
- Location of Cize
- Location within France Location within Bourgogne-Franche-Comté
- Coordinates: 46°43′57″N 5°54′38″E
- Country: France
- Region: Bourgogne-Franche-Comté
- Department: Jura
- Arrondissement: Lons-le-Saunier
- Canton: Champagnole

Government
  - Mayor (2020–2026): Philippe Wermeille
- Area^{1}: 4.19 km^{2} (1.62 sq mi)
- Highest elevation: 811 m (2,661 ft)
- Lowest elevation: 515 m (1,690 ft)
- Population (2023): 797
  - Density: 190/km^{2} (493/sq mi)
- Time zone: UTC+01:00 (CET)
  - Summer (DST): UTC+02:00 (CEST)
- INSEE/Postal code: 39153 /39300
- ^{1} French Land Register data, which excludes lakes, ponds, glaciers > 1 km^{2} (0.386 sq mi or 247 acres) and river estuaries.

Cize (French pronunciation: [siz]; Arpitan: Ciza) is a commune in the Jura department in Bourgogne-Franche-Comté in eastern France.

== Population ==
Historical population
Year	Pop.	±% p.a.
1968	378	—
1975	470	+3.16%
1982	1,005	+11.47%
1990	958	−0.60%
1999	828	−1.61%
2007	821	−0.11%
2012	804	−0.42%
2017	788	−0.40%
2023	797	+0.19%
Source: INSEE

== See also ==
- Communes of the Jura department
