= Dominique Dropsy =

French footballer (1951–2015)

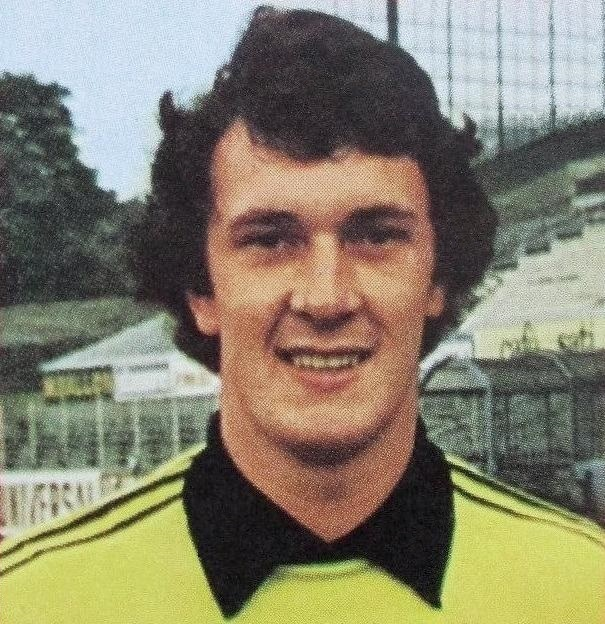
- Dropsy in 1976

Personal information
- Date of birth: 9 December 1951
- Place of birth: Leuze, Aisne, France
- Date of death: 7 October 2015 (aged 63)
- Place of death: Bordeaux, France
- Height: 1.83 m (6 ft 0 in)
- Position: Goalkeeper

Youth career
- 1961–1970: CSC Hirson

Senior career*
Years	Team	Apps	(Gls)
1970–1973	Valenciennes	57	(0)
1973–1984	Strasbourg	406	(0)
1984–1990	Bordeaux	186	(0)
Total		649	(0)

International career
1978–1981	France	17	(0)
- * Club domestic league appearances and goals

Dominique Dropsy (9 December 1951 – 7 October 2015) was a French professional footballer who played as a goalkeeper.

He played 596 Ligue 1 matches over 17 seasons, which stood as a record for several years, and won three national championships during his career, two with Bordeaux.

Dropsy represented France at the 1978 World Cup.

== Club career ==
Born in Leuze, Aisne, Dropsy started his senior career with Valenciennes. He contributed 19 games in the 1971–72 season, helping the club return to Ligue 1 and win its first Ligue 2 championship in the process.

Dropsy signed with Stasbourg in the summer of 1973. During his 11-year spell at the Stade de la Meinau he never played less than 31 matches, appearing in all 38 in the 1978–79 campaign as the team conquered their first-ever domestic league.

Aged 34, Dropsy joined Bordeaux, where he remained until his retirement always as first choice. He won a further two national championships, and added two Coupe de France to his trophy cabinet. Subsequently, he worked with his last club as a goalkeeper coach.

== International career ==
Dropsy played 17 times for the France national team in three years. He was selected as an uncapped member for the 1978 FIFA World Cup squad, benefitting from injury to his former Strasbourg teammate André Rey; in the last group phase fixture, as both countries had already been eliminated, he appeared in the 3–1 win against Hungary in Mar del Plata.

== Personal life ==
Dropsy's son, Damien (born 1983), was also a footballer and a goalkeeper. He never played the sport professionally, his biggest achievement being signing a short-term contract with Bordeaux in 2006 to serve as fourth choice.

In 2012, Damien played the role of a footballer in Olivier Dahan's motion picture Les Seigneurs.

== Health problems and death ==
After suffering an aneurysm in 2005, medical exams revealed Dropsy had been struck with leukemia in March 2011. After recovering initially the following year, the 63-year-old died in Bordeaux on 7 October 2015.
