= Raymond Kaelbel =

French footballer (1932–2007)

Personal information
- Date of birth: 31 January 1932
- Place of birth: Colmar, France
- Date of death: 17 April 2007 (aged 75)
- Place of death: Strasbourg, France
- Height: 1.81 m (5 ft 11 in)
- Position: Centre-back

Youth career
- Colmar

Senior career*
Years	Team	Apps	(Gls)
1950–1956	Strasbourg	147	(6)
1956–1961	Monaco	159	(25)
1961–1962	Le Havre	28	(0)
1962–1964	Reims	70	(7)
1964–1969	Strasbourg	103	(3)
Total		507	(41)

International career
1954–1960	France	35	(1)

Managerial career
- 1979–1988: ASPV Strasbourg
Medal record
Representing France
FIFA World Cup
Third place	1958 Sweden
- * Club domestic league appearances and goals

Raymond Kaelbel (31 January 1932 – 17 April 2007) was a French footballer who played as a centre-back. He was part of France national team during the 1958 FIFA World Cup. He was the member of The Board of directors of RC Strasbourg and resided in Illkirch-Graffenstaden before his death.

== Honours ==
Monaco

- Division 1: 1960–61
- Coupe de France: 1959–60

Strasbourg

- Coupe de France: 1965–66
