= Johnny Schuth =

French footballer (1941–2026)

Personal information
- Full name: Jean Schuth
- Date of birth: 7 December 1941
- Place of birth: Saint-Omer, German-occupied Belgium and Northern France
- Date of death: 17 August 2026 (aged 84)
- Height: 5 ft 9 in (1.75 m)
- Position: Goalkeeper

Youth career
- Thionville

Senior career*
Years	Team	Apps	(Gls)
1961–1971	Strasbourg	277	(0)
1971–1973	Metz	45	(0)
1973–1974	Merlebach		

International career
1966	France		
- * Club domestic league appearances and goals

Jean Schuth (7 December 1941 – 17 August 2026), most commonly known as Johnny Schuth, was a French footballer who played as a goalkeeper. He was part of France national team at the FIFA World Cup 1966 but never played for his country. Schuth died on 17 August 2026, at the age of 84.
