= José Farías =

Argentine footballer and manager (1937-2004)

José Urben Farías
Personal information
- Full name: José Urben Farías
- Date of birth: 17 April 1937
- Place of birth: Bolívar, Argentina
- Date of death: 10 June 2004 (aged 67)
- Place of death: Buenos Aires Argentina
- Position: Midfielder

Senior career*
Years	Team	Apps	(Gls)
1957	Boca Juniors	2	(1)
1958	Gimnasia La Plata	3	(3)
1959	Lanús	1	(0)
1960–1961	Los Andes	13	(4)
1962	Huracán	1	(0)
1962–1963	RC Paris	6	(3)
1963–1967	Strasbourg	127	(49)
1967–1970	Red Star	94	(26)
1970–1972	Toulouse	49	(10)
Total		296	(96)

Managerial career
- 1970–1972: Toulouse
- 1972–1974: Red Star
- * Club domestic league appearances and goals

José Farías (17 April 1937 – 10 June 2004) was an Argentine football player and manager. He played and coached in France.

Farías played for Boca Juniors, Club de Gimnasia y Esgrima La Plata, Club Atlético Lanús, Los Andes, Club Atlético Huracán, RC Paris, RC Strasbourg, Red Star and Toulouse FC.

He then enjoyed a coaching career with Toulouse FC and Red Star.

He died in June 2004 in Argentina.
