= Léonard Specht =

French footballer (born 1954)

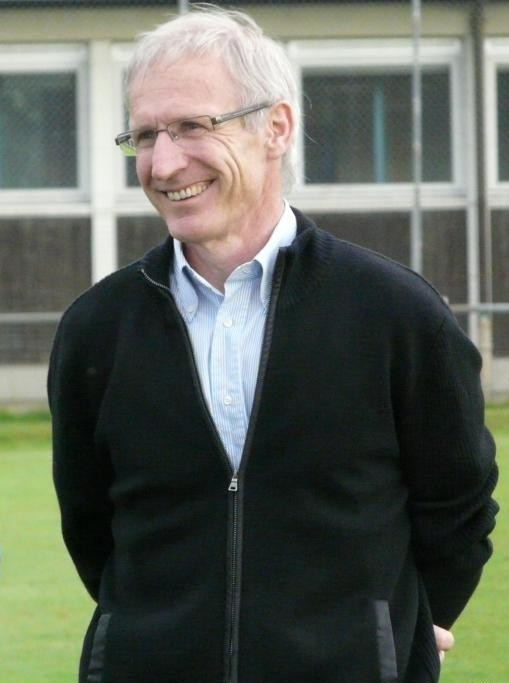

Personal information
- Date of birth: 16 April 1954 (age 72)
- Place of birth: Mommenheim, Bas-Rhin, France
- Position: Defender

Senior career*
Years	Team	Apps	(Gls)
1969–1982	Strasbourg		
1982–1987	Bordeaux		
1987–1989	Strasbourg		

International career
1978–1985	France	18	(1)

Managerial career
- 1989–1991: Strasbourg
- * Club domestic league appearances and goals

Léonard Specht (born 16 April 1954) is a French former professional footballer who played as a defender. He was also chairman of RC Strasbourg in 2009.
