= 1965–66 Coupe de France =

Tournament details
- Country: France

The Coupe de France's results of the 1965–66 season. RC Strasbourg won the final played on May 22, 1966, beating FC Nantes.

== Round of 16 ==
Team 1	Score	Team 2
RC Strasbourg (D1)	5–2	Stade Briochin (DH)
AS Cherbourg (D2)	1–0	Lille OSC (D1)
Stade de Reims (D2)	1–1 (a.e.t.)	Stade Rennais (D1)
FC Nantes (D1)	1–1 (a.e.t.)	Red Star (D1)
Toulouse FC (D1)	2–0	Olympique Lyonnais (D1)
FC Sochaux-Montbéliard (D1)	4–0	Nîmes Olympique (D1)
Angers SCO (D1)	1–1 (a.e.t.)	AS Cannes (D1)
AC Ajaccio (D2)	3–2	AS Aix (D2)
Replay
Stade de Reims (D2)	1–1 (a.e.t.)	Stade Rennais (D1)
FC Nantes (D1)	2–0	Red Star (D1)
Angers SCO (D1)	3–0	AS Cannes (D1)
2nd replay
Stade de Reims (D2)	3–2	Stade Rennais (D1)

== Quarter-finals ==
Team 1	Score	Team 2
RC Strasbourg (D1)	1–0	AS Cherbourg (D2)
Toulouse FC (D1)	2–0	FC Sochaux-Montbéliard (D1)
FC Nantes (D1)	2–0	AC Ajaccio (D2)
Angers SCO (D1)	3–1 (a.e.t.)	Stade de Reims (D2)

== Semi-finals ==
29 April 1966

RC Strasbourg	3–1 (a.e.t.)	Toulouse FC
Merschel 90'; Farías 109'; Szczepaniak 119'	(Report)	Soukhane 11'

29 April 1966

FC Nantes	3–0	Angers SCO
Gondet 29', 74'; Simon 71'	(Report)

== Final ==
22 May 1966

Strasbourg	1–0	Nantes
Sbaiz 51'

Parc des Princes, Paris
Attendance: 36,285
Referee: Jean Tricot
