= Robert Szczepaniak =

French footballer (born 1942)

Personal information
- Date of birth: 4 April 1942 (age 84)
- Place of birth: Cransac, France
- Height: 1.72 m (5 ft 7 1/2 in)
- Position: Midfielder

Youth career
- Cransac

Senior career*
Years	Team	Apps	(Gls)
1960–1961	Saint-Étienne	9	(0)
1961–1967	Strasbourg	118	(30)
1967–1970	FC Metz	74	(11)
1970–1971	Besançon	41	(4)

International career
1967–1968	France	5	(0)

Managerial career
- 1975–1979: Merlebach
- 1979–1980: Thionville
- 1981–1985: Merlebach
- * Club domestic league appearances and goals

Robert Szczepaniak (born 4 April 1942) is a French retired professional football midfielder.

== International career ==
Sczczepaniak was born in France, and is of Polish descent. He represented the France national football team.
