= René Hauss =

French footballer and coach (1927–2010)

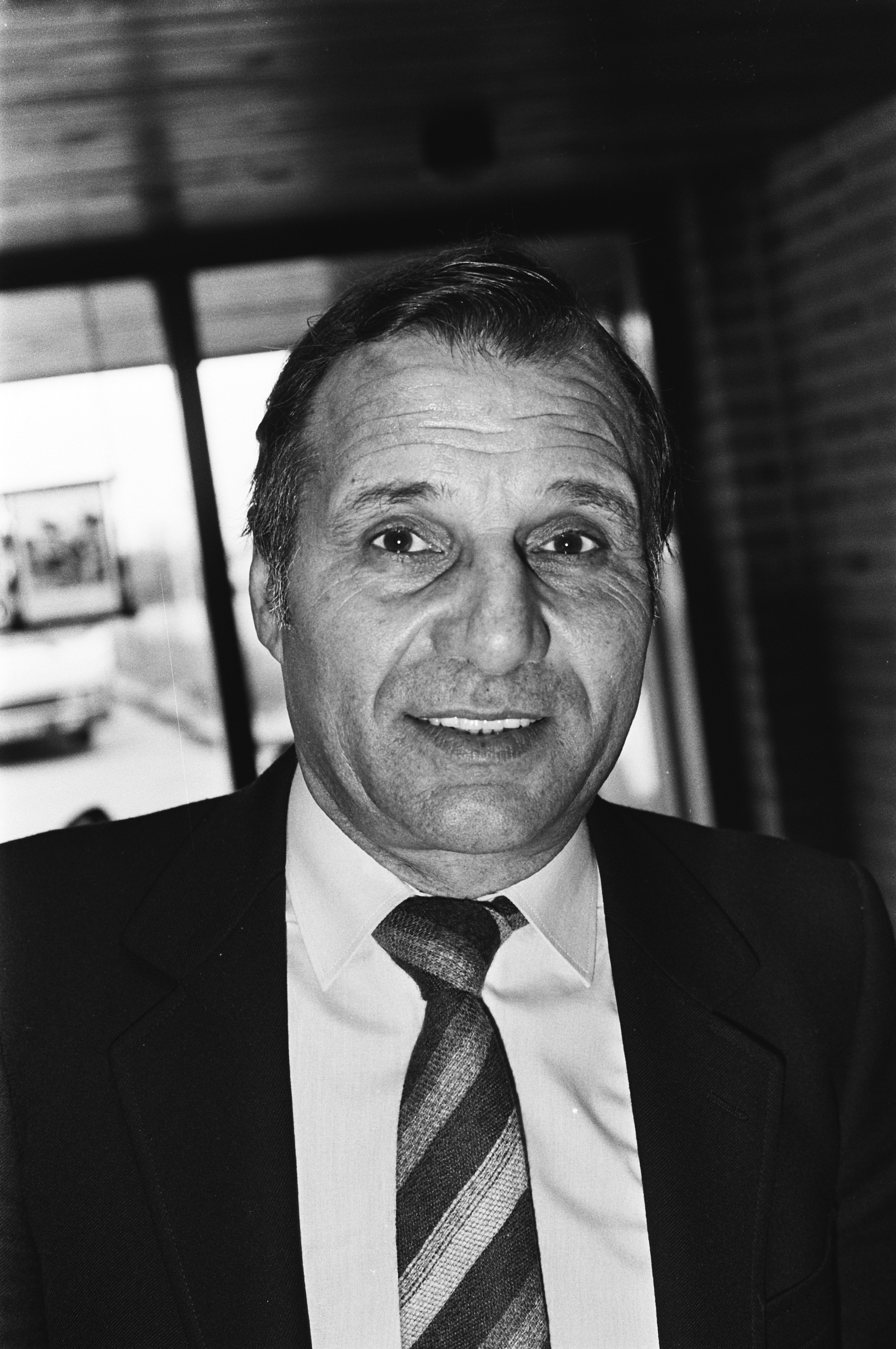

Personal information
- Date of birth: 25 December 1927
- Place of birth: Strasbourg, France
- Date of death: 6 December 2010 (aged 82)
- Position: Defender

Senior career*
Years	Team	Apps	(Gls)
1949–1968	Strasbourg		

Managerial career
- 1967–1968: Strasbourg
- 1969–1973: Standard Liège
- 1973–1985: Sochaux (Sport manager)
- 1985–1990: RC Paris (Sport manager)
- 1988–1989: RC Paris
- * Club domestic league appearances and goals

René Hauss (25 December 1927 – 6 December 2010) was a French football defender and coach.

He spent his entire playing career with RC Strasbourg.

After his playing career, he became a coach with RC Strasbourg and Standard de Liège.
