= Gilbert Gress =

French footballer (born 1941)

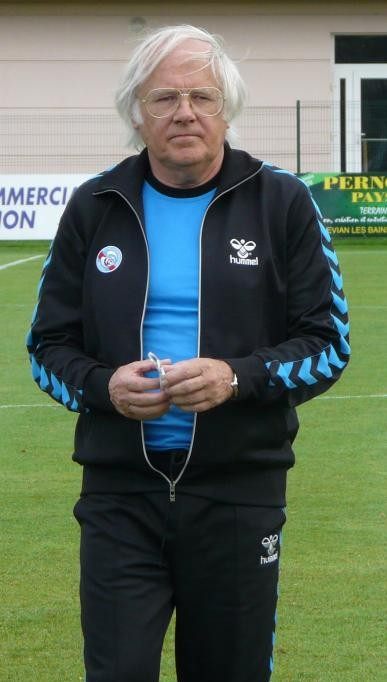
- Gress in 2009

Personal information
- Date of birth: 17 December 1941 (age 84)
- Place of birth: Straßburg, Germany (now Strasbourg, France)
- Height: 1.72 m (5 ft 8 in)
- Positions: Midfielder; forward

Senior career*
Years	Team	Apps	(Gls)
1960–1966	Strasbourg	156	(20)
1966–1970	VfB Stuttgart	152	(24)
1970–1973	Marseille	90	(8)
1973–1975	Strasbourg	69	(6)
1975–1977	Neuchâtel Xamax		
Total		467	(58)

International career
1967–1971	France	3	(0)

Managerial career
- 1975–1977: Neuchâtel Xamax
- 1977–1980: Strasbourg
- 1980–1981: FC Brugge
- 1981–1990: Neuchâtel Xamax
- 1990–1991: Servette
- 1991–1994: Strasbourg
- 1994–1997: Neuchâtel Xamax
- 1998–1999: Switzerland
- 2000–2001: FC Zürich
- 2002: Metz
- 2003: Sturm Graz
- 2004–2005: FC Sion
- 2007: FC Aarau
- 2009: Strasbourg
- * Club domestic league appearances and goals

Gilbert Gress (born 17 December 1941) is a French football coach and a former player. He was the mentor of Arsène Wenger.

== Club career ==
Gress was born in Strasbourg. He began his professional football career in the city of his birth with RC Strasbourg, where the fans soon nicknamed him the "angel of la Meinau" (L'ange de la Meinau; Engel von der Meinau, Meinau is the stadium of the club). Briefly after first playing for Strasbourg (May 1960) the team were relegated to the second division, but returned after one year to Division 1, where Gress played until 1966 and his departure to VfB Stuttgart. Strasbourg were at the time only in mid-table of the division, but won the 1966 Coupe de France.

During his time in Germany, he was called up for the first time to the France national team. During the 1970–71 season, Gress returned to his homeland and joined Olympique de Marseille, then two-time French champions. From 1973 to 1975, he came back to RC Strasbourg, before moving for one year to Neuchâtel Xamax in Switzerland and ending his playing career in 1977.

Gress completed 290 matches (201 for Strasbourg, 89 for Marseille) in France and scored 28 goals; in the federal league he came on 149 times.

== International career ==
In 1966, after having won the Coupe de France, Gress was not called up to the 1966 FIFA World Cup in England by France national team coach Henri Guérin because Gress refused to shorten his long hair. Under the new coach Louis Dugauguez, Gress was first called up on 27 September 1967 (a 5–1 defeat against Germany in Berlin). Altogether he played only three times in the France national team (1967, 1968 and 1971) and did not score any goals.

== Managerial career ==
Since 1977, Gress has worked as a football manager, receiving his first job in his home town at RC Strasbourg, where he had won the 1979 French championship, and where he returned again in 1991 for three years. His popularity is expressed also in the establishment of a Gilbert Gress Fanclub. In addition, he worked in Belgium, Austria and in Switzerland, where in 16 years (including twelve with Neuchâtel Xamax) he won two national championships and the cup. In 1998, he was appointed Swiss national football coach. A debate preceded his resignation over his wages as a national coach. In the meantime, Gress had also accepted Swiss nationality. In June 2009, he was named RC Strasbourg manager, his third stint as manager of the club. and was released after only two games on 12 August 2009.

== Honours ==
=== Player ===
Strasbourg

- Coupe de France: 1965–66

Marseille

- Ligue 1: 1970–71, 1971–72

=== Manager ===
Strasbourg

- Ligue 1: 1978–79

Neuchâtel Xamax

- Swiss Super League: 1986–87, 1987–88
- Swiss Super Cup: 1987, 1988

FC Zürich

- Swiss Cup: 1999–2000
