= Gérard Hausser =

French footballer (1941–2025)

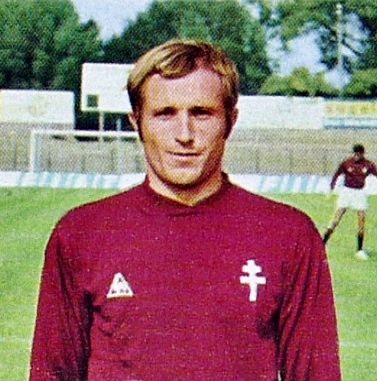
- Hausser with Metz in 1970

Personal information
- Full name: Gérard Eugène Hausser
- Date of birth: 28 October 1941
- Place of birth: Strasbourg, France
- Date of death: 16 November 2025 (aged 84)
- Place of death: Strasbourg, France
- Height: 1.74 m (5 ft 9 in)
- Position: Striker

Senior career*
Years	Team	Apps	(Gls)
1960–1967	Strasbourg	194	(62)
1967–1968	Karlsruher SC	28	(1)
1968–1971	Metz	96	(21)
1971–1974	Strasbourg	62	(11)
1974–1975	ASPV Strasbourg	0	(0)
Total		380	(95)

International career
1965–1966	France	14	(2)
- * Club domestic league appearances and goals

Gérard Hausser (28 October 1941 – 16 November 2025) was a French professional footballer who played as a striker.

Hausser was born in Strasbourg on 28 October 1941. During his career, he played for Strasbourg (1959–67, 1971–74), Karlsruher SC (1967–68), and Metz (1968–71). He earned 14 caps and scored two goals for the France national team from 1965 to 1966 and played in the 1966 FIFA World Cup. Hausser died in Strasbourg on 16 November 2025, at the age of 84.
