= RC Strasbourg Alsace =

Association football club in France

RC Strasbourg
- Full name: Racing Club de Strasbourg Alsace
- Nicknames: Le Racing; Le RCS; Les Bleu et Blanc (The Blue and Whites)
- Founded: 1 January 1906 (120 years ago) (as FC Neudorf); 1919 (107 years ago) (as Racing Club de Strasbourg)
- Stadium: Stade de la Meinau
- Capacity: 32,300
- Owner: BlueCo
- President: Marc Keller
- Head coach: Vítor Matos
- League: Ligue 1
- 2025–26: Ligue 1, 8th of 18
- Website: www.rcstrasbourgalsace.fr
Home colours	Away colours	Third colours

Racing Club de Strasbourg Alsace, commonly known as RC Strasbourg (Alemannic German: RC Stroßburg, German: RC Straßburg; RCS) or simply just Racing, is a French professional association football club founded in 1906 and based in the city of Strasbourg, Alsace. It became a professional club in 1933, and is currently playing in Ligue 1, the top tier of French football, having won the 2016–17 Ligue 2 championship. This comes after the club was demoted to the fifth tier of French football at the conclusion of the 2010–11 Championnat National season after going into financial liquidation. Renamed RC Strasbourg Alsace, they won the CFA championship in 2012–13, and became Championnat National champions in 2015–16. Stade de la Meinau has been the club's stadium since 1914.

RC Strasbourg is one of twelve clubs to have won all three major French trophies: Division 1, now Ligue 1, in 1979; the Coupe de France in 1951, 1966 and 2001; and the Coupe de la Ligue in 1964, 1997, 2005 and 2019. It is also among the thirteen teams to have played more than 2,000 games in France's top flight (spanning 67 seasons) and has taken part in 52 European games since 1961. By contrast, it has also experienced relegation at least once a decade since the early 1950s. It has changed its manager 52 times in 75 years of professional play.

The destiny of the RC Strasbourg has always been wedded to the history of Alsace. Like the region, the club has changed nationality three times and has a troubled history. The club was founded when the city (and the region of Alsace-Lorraine) was part of the German Empire, and the club insisted on its Alsatian and popular roots from the beginning, in opposition to the first Strasbourg-based clubs which came from the German-born bourgeoisie. When Alsace was returned to France after the First World War, the club changed its name from 1. FC Neudorf to the current Racing Club de Strasbourg, in imitation of Pierre de Coubertin's Racing Club de France, a clear gesture of Francophilia. RC Strasbourg players lived through the Second World War as most Alsatians did: evacuated in 1939, annexed in 1940 and striving to avoid Nazification and incorporation in the Wehrmacht between 1942 and 1944. When Alsace was definitively returned to France after the war, Strasbourg's identity switched towards Jacobinism with, for example, emotional wins in the cup in 1951 and 1966 amidst Franco-Alsatian controversies.

== History ==
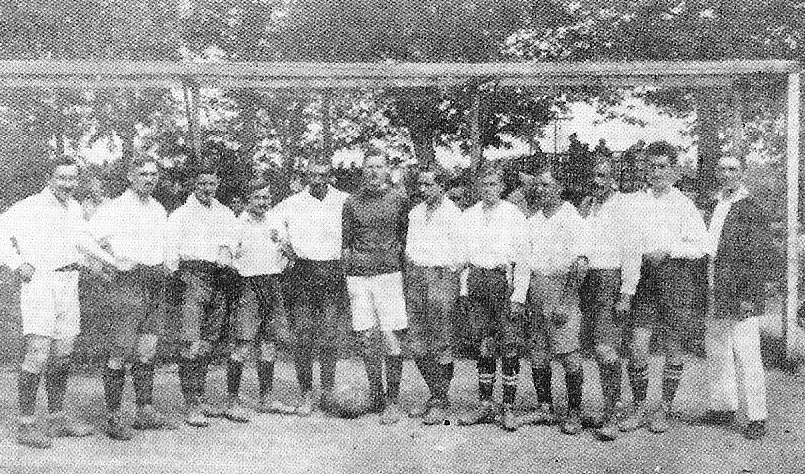
A Strasbourg lineup in 1919.

Founded in 1906 as Fußballclub Neudorf, Racing Club de Strasbourg Alsace's history has been marked by constant periods of instability, firstly due to political issues (for the first forty years of its existence, the club played alternately in the French and German championships because of the dispute between the two countries over Alsace), and secondly due to corporate issues. In spite of this, the team was able to carve out a place for itself in the golden roll of the French league by winning a number of trophies, the most important of which was the championship in the 1978–79 season.

=== Fußballclub Neudorf ===
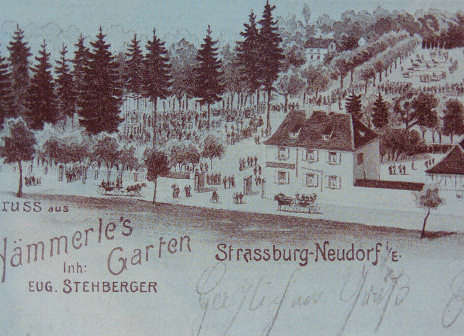
Hämmerle's Garten, Strasbourg's first field, around which the Meinau stadium would later be built.

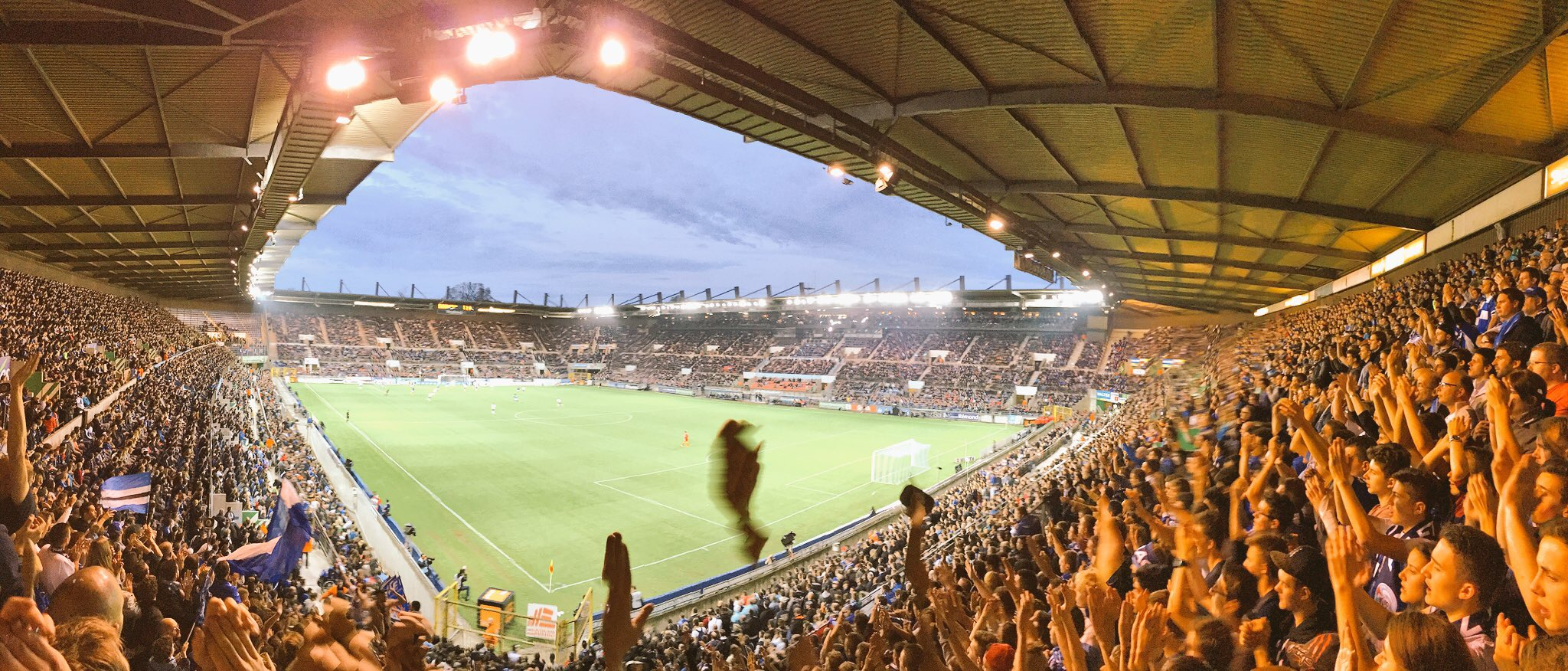
Strasbourg's home stadium since 1914, Stade de la Meinau.

In the early 1900s, the English export of football to foreign countries also reached the deepest parts of the German Empire (which had already established a national league called the Verbandsliga in 1902), including the Reichsland Alsace-Lorraine. One of the cities most involved in this process was the capital city of Strasbourg (which already had a football club called Straßburger Fußball Club since 1890), where several football clubs saw the light of day, including Fußballclub Neudorf, founded by a group of students from the Neudorf district, located south of the city. The team, which was financially supported by the students' teacher, made its debut in a match against FC Germania from the Schluthfeld district, in which it withdrew after conceding seven goals in the first forty-five minutes of play.

Over the next three years, the team, renamed Fußballclub Cäsar Neudorf and given a corporate organizational chart to cope with the inexperience of the players, continued to produce unconvincing results, attracting criticism and threatening to split several times. Thanks to the arrival of Louis Becker as president, in 1909 Neudorf was able to gain membership in the Verband Süddeutscher Fußball-Vereine, the football association in the southern part of the German Empire, which was part of the third tier of German football. Neudorf began a gradual improvement in results: thanks to a highly offensive style of play, the team achieved large victories (including a 28–0 victory over Erstein, the second largest margin of victory in the history of German football), which led to a double promotion within two years. In 1914, a few weeks before promotion to the first division, Neudorf acquired its first playing field, the Hämmerlé's Garten, on which the Meinau Stadium was built. In the same year, all sports activities were interrupted due to the outbreak of the First World War.

=== The debut in French football ===
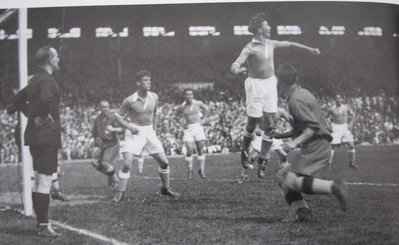
1937 French Cup Final between Sochaux and Strasbourg.

With the annexation of Alsace and Lorraine to France at the end of the war, it was decided to change the name of the club, which, in homage to Racing Club de France, became Racing Club de Strasbourg. In the decade following the end of hostilities, Strasbourg played in the Alsace regional championship (winning it in 1923, 1924 and 1927) and, from the 1920–21 season, in the French Cup. In the latter competition, the team never made it past the round of 16, but in the 1925–26 season, it pulled off an upset by eliminating Red Star, a team that at the time held the record for most national cups won. It was also during this period that the first wooden stands were built on the field, which later became the Meinau Stadium.

In 1932, Strasbourg's management rejected a proposal to turn the team professional that had just been approved by the Football Federation. Attempts to change management's decision (including a proposal to merge with Strasbourg Red Star) yielded a positive result a year later when, after a vote of 126 for, 2 against and 2 abstentions, the team was finally allowed to become professional and debut in the second division.

After winning the playoffs against rivals Mulhouse and Saint-Étienne, the Alsatians battled with Sochaux for the title in their debut in the top flight. Initially, Strasbourg had the upper hand, finishing first in the first half of the season, but lost the head-to-head match on the road to Sochaux, who went on to win the title despite losing the final match. In the following championships, the team, boosted by German striker Oskar Rohr, confirmed its status as a mid-table team, while in the 1936–37 Coupe de France, Strasbourg reached the final: again, Sochaux prevailed, winning 2–1 in a comeback.

=== Re-annexation to the German Reich ===
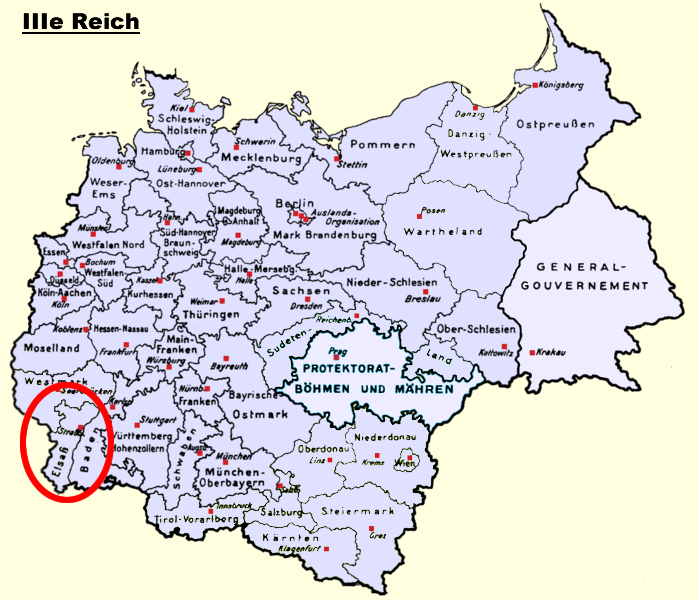
During the German occupation of Alsace in World War II, Strasbourg played in the Gauliga Elsaß.

At the beginning of World War II, with the occupation of France by the Third Reich army, the team was reconstituted as an amateur club by some players who had fled to the south of the country. After winning the regional championship, the team was introduced into the German football system, taking the name Rasensportclub Straßburg and playing in the Gauliga Elsaß.

From then until the liberation of Alsace, Strasbourg would play in four editions of the Gauliga, finishing second three times in a row (losing the title to Mulhouse in a playoff in the first year) and participating in the 1941–42 edition of the German Cup, where they were eliminated by Mulhouse in the first round. Notable during this period was the heated rivalry with Red Star Strasbourg, renamed SS Strasbourg after their affiliation with the regime's political police.

=== The postwar period ===
At the end of hostilities, with the return of Alsace to the political control of France, Strasbourg was reintegrated into the same football system in which it had participated before the outbreak of the war. After finishing twelfth in the league at the end of the war, Strasbourg came close to a double in the 1946–47 season, finishing among the contenders for the championship and competing for the French Cup until the final, where they were defeated by Lille.

In the following seasons, Strasbourg went through a period of mixed results: in the 1948–49 championship, the team, relegated on the field, avoided relegation thanks to Colmar's abandonment of its professional status. Two seasons later, the team won its first official trophy by winning the 1950–51 edition of the French Cup: this was possible thanks to a victory in the final against Valenciennes, which sparked celebrations throughout Alsace, culminating in the team being welcomed by 50,000 fans.

Winning this trophy did not bring stability to the team's results, as they dropped to the second division three times during the 1950s (1952, 1957, and 1960), only to return to the top flight immediately afterwards. The only notable result of the decade came in the 1954–55 season, when Strasbourg, led by Ernst Stojaspal, contended for the top spots in the standings, finishing fourth overall, and were eliminated by Lille in the French Cup semifinals.

=== The debut in Europe ===
In the early 1960s, Strasbourg had the chance to make their debut on the European stage, playing in the 1961–62 edition of the Fairs Cup, where they were eliminated in the first round by MTK Hungária. Thanks to subsidies from the municipality, Strasbourg experienced a period of improved results, culminating in the 1964–65 season, during which the team fought for the title: in second place, one point behind Nantes with four games to play, the Alsatians drew the head-to-head match and then succumbed in the final, finishing fifth. In the same season, the team had an excellent performance in the Fairs Cup, reaching the quarterfinals (after eliminating the likes of AC Milan and Barcelona, the latter equalizing in the dying seconds of the second leg and being eliminated after a 0–0 draw in the replay), where they were eliminated by Manchester United, who had already guaranteed qualification to the semifinals from the first leg (thanks to a 5–0 away win).

The following season, Strasbourg reached the final of the French Cup for the fourth time in the club's history, defeating Toulouse after equalizing with a minute remaining and then winning in extra time. In the final, the Alsatians faced newly crowned French champions Nantes, whom they defeated 1–0. In the same season, Strasbourg also participated in the Fairs Cup, where they met AC Milan in the first round. After losing 1–0 at the San Siro, the Alsatians won the return leg 2–1, forcing a play-off, which Milan won on a draw after the match ended 1–1.

In the following seasons, Strasbourg's results in competitions were unremarkable (except for a fifth-place finish in the 1969–70 season), so much so that the club's management decided to merge the club with the amateur team Pierrots Vauban, renaming it Racing Pierrots Strasbourg Meinau. However, the results were unsatisfactory: in the first season under the new name (1970–71), the team was relegated to Division 2, only to return to the top flight the following year. A second relegation in the 1975–76 season led to a split in the club with the re-founding of Pierrots Vauban and the restoration of the Racing Club de Strasbourg name.

=== Championship title ===

The starting lineup of the 1978–79 French champions Strasbourg.

After regaining promotion by winning the second division after a playoff with the top team in Group A (Monaco), Strasbourg started the 1977–78 season with a virtually unchanged lineup from the previous year, with the addition of Jacques Novi, Francis Piasecki (both from Paris Saint-Germain), and Raymond Domenech. Gilbert Gress, a former Strasbourg center forward in the 1960s who would become the most representative coach in the club's history, was also brought in to lead the team. Under Gress, the team adopted a tactic based on collective play, based on the 4–3–3 formation, which included the use of Gemmrich, Tanter and Vergnes as attackers. After a slow start, Strasbourg gradually regained positions and placed themselves among the contenders for a place in the UEFA zone, which then consisted of only two teams. A late collapse by Olympique Marseille allowed the Alsatians to move into third place with three days to go: a 3–2 win at Laval on the final day secured them the final spot to qualify for their third European competition.

Riding the wave of this success, Strasbourg prepared for the next season without making too many changes to the squad, only buying Roger Jouve from Nice and replacing Vergnes with the younger Wagner. The team started the championship in better form than the previous year, taking the lead on the fifth day and maintaining it throughout the season, although a defeat against Saint-Étienne in the return leg had favored the Verts' approach. A brace by Wagner and a goal by Ehrlacher in the final match against Lyon (on June 1, 1979) sparked celebrations throughout Alsace, which culminated the following day when the team was welcomed by 200,000 fans at Strasbourg station.

=== The decline ===
Immediately after winning the national title, the team's leadership was taken over by the politician André Bord, repeatedly elected Secretary of State for the Ministry of the Interior and the Ministry for Veterans in the governments installed between 1966 and 1978 and former president of the team's multisport section. The new president almost immediately came into conflict with Gress by organizing a transfer window that brought to Strasbourg outstanding players such as the national player François Bracci and the top scorer Carlos Bianchi, who, however, did not meet the tactical requirements of the coach. This climate of conflict at the top of the club, known as the Affaire Gress-Bord, also affected the performance of the team, which, with a center forward incompatible with Gress's tactics based on the collective, failed to defend the title and, as compensation, reached the quarterfinals of the European Cup, where they were eliminated by Ajax.

The tensions between Gress and Bord reached a climax at the beginning of the 1980–81 season: after a very bad start in the championship, the fans, siding with Gress, began to harshly challenge the club, demanding the resignation of Bord, who, supported also by prominent politicians such as Jacques Chirac, remained at the helm of the club and fired the coach. This event marked the end of Strasbourg's golden era, which saw the loss of almost all the players who had contributed to the 1979 championship within a few years, replaced by important names (Didier Six, Jean-François Larios, Éric Pécout and Olivier Rouyer) who were never able to live up to expectations. This was also reflected in the team's results, which stagnated in the lower mid-table positions during the first half of the 1980s until the 1985–86 season, which ended with Strasbourg's relegation to Division 2 and the resignation of Bord, who left Daniel Hechter a team in the midst of corporate chaos, which remained entangled in the lower parts of the second division and then finished in ninth place. The team's new president, formerly the leading man of Paris Saint-Germain in the 1970s, had plans to rebuild a winning team, but his ambitions clashed with a disastrous economic situation that reached such a level in 1990 (a debt of 90 million francs was discovered) that he was forced to resign under pressure from the city's mayor.

=== The return to Europe ===
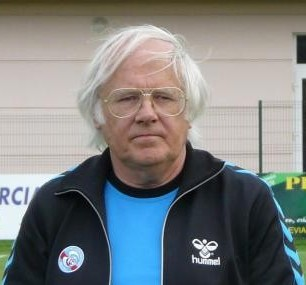
Gilbert Gress. A prominent figure in the history of Strasbourg, he made his debut as a footballer with the team and finished his career there. He then went on to coach Strasbourg in three different spells (the last of which was in 2009), leading the team to its first national title.

The team, which had reached the top flight the previous two years only to drop back to the second division, was entrusted to industrialist Jacky Kientz. Failure to win promotion in the 1990–91 season prompted the management to recall Gress to the bench: relying on young prospects such as Frank Leboeuf and Martin Djetou, the coach led the team back to Division 1 after a close battle with Bordeaux and a 4–0 victory over Stade Rennais in the promotion/relegation playoff. Back in the top flight, Strasbourg made their debut by finishing close to the UEFA qualification spots. At the end of the following season, in which the team avoided relegation, there was a change at the top of the club, with Roland Weller taking over as president. Despite offers to extend his contract, Gress, who had come into conflict with some players during the championship over his training methods, decided to leave the team, causing discontent among the fans.

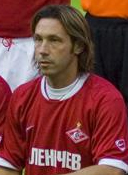
Aleksandr Mostovoi, a key player for Strasbourg, where he played from 1994 to 1996.

Such events did not initially destabilize the team's performance, which, entrusted to former player Daniel Jeandupeux, was in third place at the beginning of the 1994–95 season. A decline over the winter favored the replacement of Jeandupeux with former player Jacky Duguépéroux, who led the team to the French Cup final (lost 1–0 to Paris Saint-Germain) and tenth place in the league, which qualified the team for the newly created Intertoto Cup. By winning the competition, Strasbourg gained access to the UEFA Cup, returning to the European stage after a sixteen-year absence: their progress in the competition was interrupted by AC Milan in the round of 16. In the following two seasons, despite the departures of key players compensated by the introduction of youth players into the first team (including Olivier Dacourt, who made his debut as a striker), the team continued to achieve results that helped them qualify for European competitions, This culminated in the 1996–97 season, when the team finished ninth in the league after spending much of the season in mid-table positions, but qualified directly for the UEFA Cup thanks to winning the League Cup, which they did after narrowly defeating Bordeaux in the final.

That season also saw another change at the top of the club, which was taken over on March 21, 1997 by the IMG group, headed by former tennis player Patrick Proisy: the new ownership sparked a wave of optimism among the team's supporters, but they played a championship far below expectations and struggled to avoid relegation until the last day. The same season will also be remembered for the team's journey in the UEFA Cup: after eliminating Rangers, Strasbourg faced Liverpool in the second round, winning 3–0 at home to effectively secure qualification, as the 2–0 defeat at Anfield did not affect the aggregate score. The Alsatians' adventure came to an end in the third round against Inter Milan, who bounced back from a first-leg defeat.

The departure of Duguépéroux, who was in conflict with the management, opened a new dark period for the team, which had some bad seasons with unimpressive results both in the league and in the national cups. The worst moment seemed to materialize in the 2000–01 season, at the end of which the team was relegated to Division 2, having finished last without ever being able to fight to avoid relegation. However, the negative result was compensated by winning the third French Cup, which came after defeating Amiens in the final: the match, which ended 0–0 after extra time, was decided by penalty kicks, with the Alsatians winning 5–4. Thanks to this result, Strasbourg, who had been coached by Ivan Hašek during the summer, qualified for the UEFA Cup, from which they were eliminated in the first round by Standard Liège. This allowed the team to focus on the league, where they made a comeback to finish second and return to the newly formed Ligue 1.

=== Management changes, crisis and decline ===
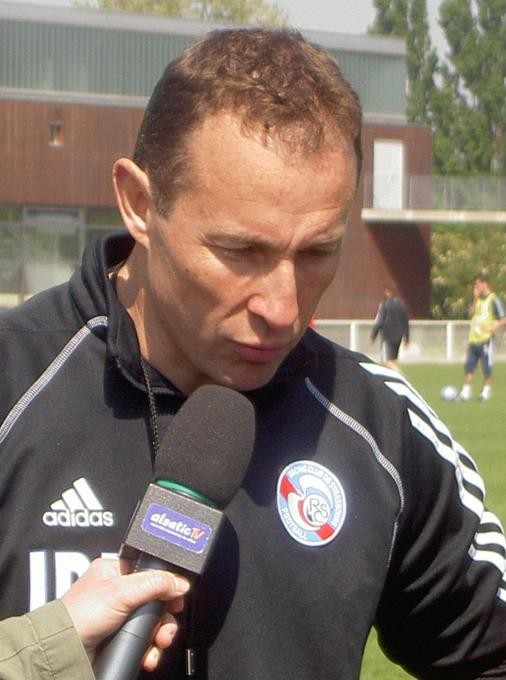
Jean-Pierre Papin, coach of the team in the 2006–07 season.

The 2002–03 season, which ended with the team avoiding relegation, saw a change in the club's top management, which had already been shaken by legal vicissitudes regarding the use of the club's name: the IMG group was replaced by a group of entrepreneurs led by German businessman Egon Gindorf. With the legal problems resolved, Strasbourg (with Antoine Kombouaré and Jacky Duguépéroux on the bench) battled through two mid-table seasons, culminating in the 2004–05 season with victory in the second League Cup against Caen (2–1). After qualifying for the UEFA Cup again, Strasbourg seemed to be on their way to a second golden period, but Philippe Ginestet's ascension to the club's presidency caused dissension in the management, which also affected the team's performance in the 2005–06 season, which ended in early relegation, with the first win not coming until the third-last day of the first half of the season. This negative result was offset by Strasbourg's performance in the UEFA Cup, where they were eliminated by Roma in the round of 16.

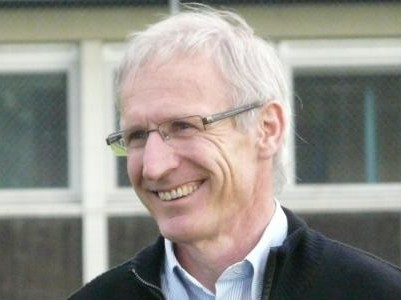
Léonard Specht. A former member of the 1979 French title-winning squad, he took over as club president in June 2009, only to resign two months later because of the club's poor start to the season.

After winning promotion to Ligue 1 at the end of the 2006–07 season thanks to Jean-Pierre Papin (who knew how to get the most out of a team made up of players from lower leagues), Strasbourg started the 2007–08 season with Jean-Marc Furlan on the bench. The team seemed to be struggling on a par with the other relegation contenders, navigating mid-table positions until midway through the season, but from March onward, they suffered a steep decline that saw them drop positions until they finished second-last. In this context, a 2–1 defeat against Lyon, thanks to a goal scored by Fabio Grosso, who was heavily insulted by Furlan at the end of the game, is noteworthy; despite the controversy and the result, the club confirmed Furlan at the helm of the team that failed to gain promotion to Ligue 1 in the 2008–09 season, losing to Boulogne on the final day of the season.

At the end of the season, there was a reshuffle at the top of the club, bringing in former player Léonard Specht who, after trying to sign Gernot Rohr, hired Gress, who then returned to lead the team for the third time. However, the beginning of the 2009–10 season was marked by a confusing situation at the top of the club, with Gress (opposed by Ginestet who remained in the company as majority shareholder) being replaced after two defeats in the first two matches. Due to this result, Spécht also resigned, which favored the return of Ginestet as president, who called Pascal Janin, formerly Gress's assistant, to the bench. In November 2009, negotiations began for the transfer of Strasbourg's ownership to the English company FC Football Capital Limited, which took control of the club on December 5 with Julien Fournier as president. The vicissitudes at the corporate level were reflected in the team's results: six points clear of the relegation zone with six days to go, Strasbourg collapsed with only two points, and were overtaken by the other relegation contenders on the final day, dropping to the third division.

At the end of the 2010–11 Third Division season, Strasbourg finished fourth and missed out on promotion to Ligue 2, but the club went bankrupt and had to restart from the fifth division, the Championnat de France Amateur 2 Group C.

=== Promotion from the fifth division to Ligue 1, European campaign ===
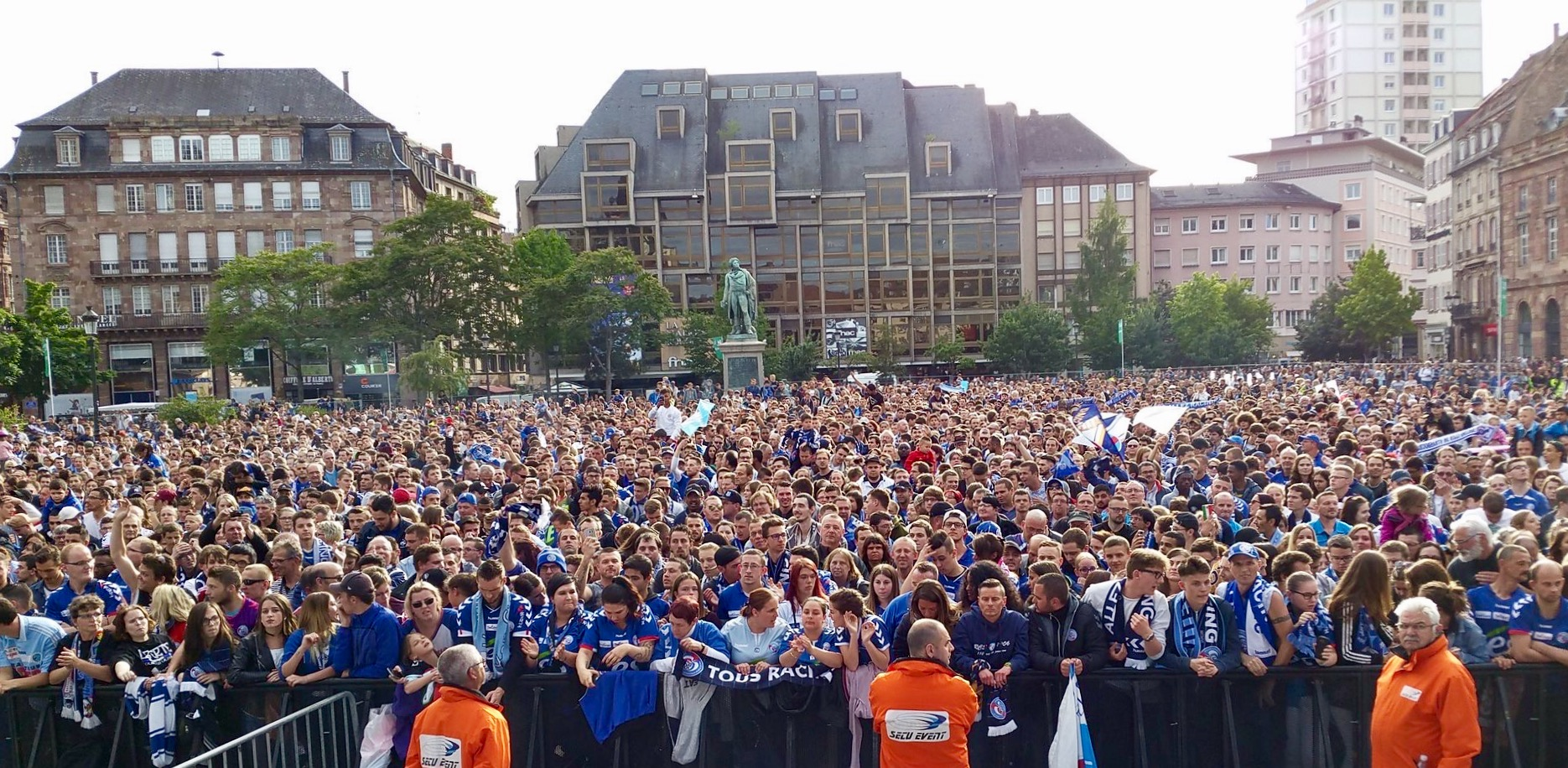
Racing Club of Strasbourg celebrates French Ligue 2 title and promotion to Ligue 1 at Kléber in 2017

In 2011–12, the team immediately returned to the Championnat de France Amateur, the fourth division, winning Group C of the Championnat de France Amateur 2 with 100 points. In 2012, the team changed its name to Racing Club de Strasbourg Alsace and also changed its logo. After winning the fourth division championship in 2012–13, the club returned to the Championnat National, the third division, within two years. For the 2014–15 season, Jacky Duguépéroux took over after François Keller had managed the club for three years. In 2015–16, Strasbourg won the National and returned to Ligue 2 after six years. In 2016–17, they completed the climb, winning the second division as a newly promoted team and landing in the top flight. In the 2017–18 Ligue 1, the team finished in 15th place, saving themselves on the penultimate day thanks to a win at Décines-Charpieu against Olympique Lyonnais in a comeback with a free kick goal by Dimitri Liénard in the final minutes. In 2018–19, the team won the French League Cup for the third time, defeating Guingamp 4–1 on penalties in the final.

On 22 June 2023, BlueCo reached an agreement to become shareholders of Strasbourg. In the 2024–25 season, Strasbourg secured a seventh-place finish in the league, earning qualification for the UEFA Conference League.

On 28 August 2025, Strasbourg qualified for the Conference League League phase for the first time in their history, after defeating Brondby IF 3–2 on aggregate. All the goals scored in the second leg of the playoff. Strasbourg had last played in a UEFA club competition in the 2019-20 and 2005-06 Europa league (formerley the UEFA Cup).

Strasbourg went on to win the League Phase of the Conference League, remaining undefeated through the 6 games series (5 wins and 1 draw). Strasbourg Qualified two points clear of the next best team, entering the Knockout Phase as top seed. Wins over Rijeka (Round of 16) and a 4-2 aggregate win over Mainz 05, via a 4-0 home Quarter Final leg victory, saw Strasbourg make the Semi-Finals of one of the main European competitions for the first time. The most recent previous European relevant Semi-Final was the 1995-96 UEFA Intertoto Cup.

Strasbourg claimed an equal 3rd Bronze Medal finish in the tournament, after losing both legs of the Semi-Final 0-1 (0-2 on aggregate) to Rayo Vallecano. A first ever main UEFA tournament placing for Racing (excluding the Intertoto Cup).

== Colours and crest ==
While the colours of the town are red and white, Racing has always played in a combination of blue and white. The exact origin of this choice of colours is unknown. Over the years, the most common uniform has been composed of a medium blue jersey, white shorts and medium blue socks. During the last ten years, however, the team has regularly switched between medium blue, dark blue, sky blue and white as the main colour of its home jersey. Since 2007, the Flag of Alsace is featured on the back of the club's shirt. Hummel is the current kit designer. Previously (1973–2000; 2004–2007), Racing was equipped by Adidas, which has its French seat in Landersheim, between Strasbourg and Saverne. ASICS also supplied the club (2000–03).

The current team crest has been in use – with interruptions – since 1976 and is generally considered as the most legitimate one. It includes a stylised stork (symbol of Alsace), a red diagonal stripe from the city's coat of arms and a depiction of the Cathedral along with the club's initials: RCS. Between 1997 and 2006, the club used another logo, introduced by Patrick Proisy. This crest was then considered to be more "modern" and was supposed to depict at the same time the cathedral and a stork. The resemblance, however, was far from being obvious to everyone and the design was quickly derogatively nicknamed "Pac-Man" due to some common traits with the famous video game. In 2006, the new management of the club, acceding to a supporter demand, re-installed the 1976 crest.

== Stadium ==
Racing have been playing at the Stade de la Meinau in southern Strasbourg since 1914. The stadium hosted the 1938 World Cup and Euro 1984. Its maximum capacity was downsized from 45,000 to 29,000 during the 1990s to meet new safety standards.

== Supporters and rivalries ==
Main Article: RC Strasbourg Alsace supporters

Historically, Racing has its roots in southern Strasbourg in the working-class Neudorf, Meinau and Polygone neighbourhoods. In the 1930s, the team was the only one in the area to jump to professional play and, with the help of good results during that decade, it built support all around the town. In Strasbourg like in the rest of France, there is only one pro football club in every city and hence no in-town rivalry, a fact that heavily contrasts with the situation in Great Britain, Italy or Spain. Nowadays, as the only professional football club in Alsace, Racing attracts a large fan base that covers both the Bas-Rhin and Haut-Rhin départements as well as the eastern part of the Moselle. The fan-base outside of this area is essentially limited to people that, for a reason or another, have a personal link with Alsace. The club also has ties to the other side of the Rhine, especially through a supporter friendship with Karlsruher SC and regular friendly matches during the summer.

On average, the attendance in Ligue 1 has been around 20,000 for a stadium capacity of 29,000. Supporters groups include the "Ultra Boys 90", the "Kop Ciel et Blanc" and the "Club central des supporters". Most of the supporter groups and the most vocal fans in general have elected location in the Kop at the "Quart de Virage Nord-Ouest" (North-West quarter corner). Strasbourg supporters have the reputation to be faithful yet critical. Former captain Corentin Martins has once asserted that the Strasbourg public is "demanding, but fair". Racing is always an emotional topic in Alsace. It is often said that some may love it or hate it, or even both at the same time, but that it leaves no one indifferent.

Racing Strasbourg's main rival is Metz. The clubs compete is what is generally referred as the "Derby de l'Est" ("the Eastern derby") in France, a rather inappropriate term since the two cities are 150 kilometres apart. There is however a significant degree of inter-regional rivalry between Alsace and Lorraine, leading to some acrimony between the fans on both sides. The two clubs met each other in the quarter-finals of the 1995 UEFA Intertoto Cup in what was the first ever match between two French teams in a European competition. Strasbourg won the game 2–0. When Mulhouse was professional, the two sides also nourished a rivalry that persists as far as youth teams are concerned.

== Ownership and chairmanship ==
=== Overview ===
Racing's history has always been closely intertwined with local business and politics. In the 1930s, the club's jump to professionalism was sustained by car manufacturer Emile Mathis who had his factory just in front of the stade de la Meinau. RCS quickly entered a rivalry with Sochaux, a team that was backed by Mathis' competitor Peugeot. After WW2, Mathis ceased activity and the club had to find other sponsors including the Crédit Mutuel – a large banking institution that has its roots in Alsace and appeared on the club's shirt throughout most of the 1960s and 1970s – as well as the town's municipality. In 1980, André Bord, a prominent local Gaullist politician and former minister during the Charles de Gaulle and Georges Pompidou presidencies, became chairman. Bord could boast his connections in business, political and artistic elites and vowed to make Racing a big name in French football. However, he quickly entered a confrontation with charismatic manager Gilbert Gress that culminated in September 1980 when the announcement of Gress' departure provoked crowd anger and riots scenes during a game against Nantes. The inability for the influential president and the talented manager to get along with each other and the 1980 trauma may explain why Racing was unable to perform lastingly at the top level after the 1979 title.

In 1986, Bord left the professional section and introduced fashion designer Daniel Hechter as his successor. Hechter had previously been banned from pro football following his involvement in the Paris Saint-Germain secret funds scandal but was nevertheless able to re-take a president job at Strasbourg thanks to a sentence reduction. It was the first attempt to bring an outsider to the local context at the club's head, but the experiment ended in failure in 1990 as the club neared bankruptcy. Racing was at that time salvaged by the Strasbourg municipality which took a 49% share of the club but had to relinquish it a few years later as the Pasqua legislation restricted public support to professional sport. In 1997, two projects were competing to buy the municipal share and effectively take control of the club. The first was led by then-president Roland Weller, a local businessman. The second bid was made by American IMG-McCormack Group through its French branch headed by Patrick Proisy. At that time, IMG was trying to develop its activities in European football and had failed the previous year in its effort to buy Marseille. The American group presented an ambitious project with an entirely new youth academy as well as plans for a renovated stadium, eventually winning the competition for Racing's ownership for a price of 1.5 million euros. The club became a "Société Anonyme à Objet Sportif" and then a "Société Anonyme Sportive Professionnelle", a status very similar to the general corporate status, albeit with restrictions like the impossibility to enter the stock market and the obligation to keep ties with the original association. Proisy became the chairman of the board with full control over the professional section but not the omni-sport structure that still possessed the club's name and its affiliation to the French Football Federation (FFF). This was evidenced in 2002 when Proisy and Bord, still a chairman of the omni-sport, entered a dispute that led to the inability for the pro players to wear the name "Racing club de Strasbourg" on their jerseys for some time.

Proisy's reign at Strasbourg was fraught with misunderstandings, frustration and poor results on the pitch. The Alsatian public especially resented Proisy's unwillingness to settle in Strasbourg, instead controlling the club's destiny from IMG's offices in Paris. Racing's troubles as well as the town's refusal to finance an extension of the stade de la Meinau to host the 1998 FIFA World Cup provoked heated debate during the 2001 municipal election and eventually became part of the elements that drove to the defeat of Catherine Trautmann. In 2003, the club was bought back by a pool of local investors including Egon Gindorf, who became chairman, Patrick Adler, Pierre Schmidt and Philippe Ginestet, who all had been club sponsors during the IMG era. The new ownership bought the club for a symbolical euro to an IMG group eager to cut its losses after the death of Mark McCormack but had to cover a 3 million euro deficit to close the 2002–03 budget. It is estimated that Racing lost 15 million euros during the IMG era, mainly due to a dubious recruitment policy.

In 2004, Gindorf experienced personal and financial difficulties and was willing to scale down his involvement at Racing. It was understood that Philippe Ginestet would become the new chairman at the end of the 2004–05 season. However, this move was opposed by Keller who, in June 2005, clearly announced that he would not work with Ginestet. Keller had in fact been acting as the club's head since 2002 but was only a minor shareholder. He nevertheless was able to mobilise his iconic status with supporters to, at first, block Ginestet's accession to chairmanship, provoking a deadlock that lasted throughout 2005 as the club was looking for an investor. In the fall of 2005, it was announced that Alain Afflelou, owner of the biggest optician in France and a former president of Bordeaux, would be the new owner, but he was eventually out-bid by Ginestet, who took control of the club midway through the 2005–06 season, forcing Keller's departure a few months later. Ginestet held a majority share during four years, which he sold in the end of 2009 for a price of €1.6 million. After some speculation, the new owner was identified as Alain Fontenla, a French investment broker based in London. In 2010, Fontenla owned 85%, along with Carousel Finance (15%) a holding named "Racing investissements", which itself owned a majority share (70%) of EuroRacing, the main shareholder (78%) of the club. The other major shareholder of the club was Lohr SA, an industrial group centred on transportation activities.

On 22 June 2023, BlueCo, the consortium which purchased Premier League club Chelsea in May 2022, acquired a majority stake in the club.

=== Presidential history ===
Below is a list of Strasbourg's 15 presidents since the start of the professional era in 1933. The president has not always been the real owner of the club. For example, between 1990 and 1997, the municipality was the major shareholder, but it chose to delegate the chairmanships to independent local entrepreneurs.

The 2009–10 season saw a record of five successive presidents. Early into the season, Léonard Specht stepped down from his position, after the sacking of Glibert Gress, whom he had appointed as manager. Philippe Ginestet then re-took the presidency, but left the club when the takeover by the new owners was completed in December. The new owners chose to name Julien Fournier as the new Chief executive but, after some turmoil, Fournier quickly entered a dispute with the new major shareholder, Alain Fontenla. Fournier's contract was terminated in February and he was replaced by Luc Dayan on an interim basis. Only a month later, former Sochaux chairman Jean-Claude Plessis came to replace Dayan.

Name	Years
Joseph Heintz	1933–52
Willy Scheuer	1952–62
Joseph Heintz	1962–68
Alfred Wenger	1968–72
Philippe Fass	1972–75
Alain Léopold	1975–79
André Bord	1979–85
Jean Wuillaume	1985–86
Daniel Hechter	1986–90
Jacky Kientz	1990–92
Jean Wendling	1992–94
Rolland Weller	1994–97

Name	Years
Patrick Proisy	1997–03
Egon Gindorf	2003–05
Philippe Ginestet	2005–09
Léonard Specht	2009
Philippe Ginestet	2009
Julien Fournier	2009–10
Luc Dayan	2010
Jean-Claude Plessis	2010
Jafar Hilali	2010–11
Thomas Fritz	2011
Frederic Sitterle	2011–12
Marc Keller	2012–present

== Players ==
=== Current squad ===
As of 1 September 2026

Note: Flags indicate national team as defined under FIFA eligibility rules; some limited exceptions apply. Players may hold more than one non-FIFA nationality.

No.	Pos.	Nation	Player
1	GK	DEN	Filip Jörgensen (on loan from Chelsea)
4	DF	CRC	Jeyland Mitchell
6	DF	FRA	Ismaël Doukouré
7	FW	ENG	Sam Amo-Ameyaw
8	MF	POL	Maxi Oyedele
9	FW	ARG	Joaquín Panichelli
10	MF	USA	Gio Reyna
11	FW	SWE	Sebastian Nanasi
12	GK	POL	Miłosz Piekutowski
14	MF	POR	Dário Essugo (on loan from Chelsea)
15	DF	ARG	Mateo Del Blanco
16	DF	SWE	Genesis Antwi (on loan from Chelsea)
19	FW	POR	Fábio Baldé
20	FW	CIV	Martial Godo
21	MF	SEN	Pape Demba Diop

No.	Pos.	Nation	Player
23	MF	POR	Diogo Sousa
24	DF	DEN	Lucas Høgsberg
26	MF	ENG	Omari Kellyman
28	MF	FRA	Tyrese Noubissie
29	MF	MAR	Samir El Mourabet
30	FW	ESP	Jacobo Ortega
31	DF	GER	Karim Coulibaly
36	DF	ESP	Oso
37	FW	FRA	Ghianny Kodia
40	FW	DEN	Conrad Harder (on loan from RB Leipzig)
42	FW	BRA	Deivid Washington
45	MF	SWE	Benjamin Brantlind
80	FW	MAR	Gessime Yassine
—	DF	FRA	Hermann Malonga
—	FW	FRA	Sékou Mara

=== Out on loan ===
Note: Flags indicate national team as defined under FIFA eligibility rules; some limited exceptions apply. Players may hold more than one non-FIFA nationality.

No.	Pos.	Nation	Player
—	DF	FRA	Soumaïla Coulibaly (at loan to Watford until 30 June 2027)
—	DF	FRA	Yoni Gomis (at loan to Beveren until 30 June 2027)
—	DF	IRL	Andrew Omobamidele (at loan to Anderlecht until 30 June 2027)
—	DF	GUI	Saïdou Sow (at loan to Nantes until 30 June 2027)

No.	Pos.	Nation	Player
—	MF	FRA	Mathis Amougou (at loan to Toulouse until 30 June 2027)
—	MF	FRA	Idrissa Sabaly (at loan to Red Star until 30 June 2027)
—	FW	SRB	Miloš Luković (at loan to 1. FC Kaiserslautern until 30 June 2027)
—	FW	FRA	Rayane Messi (at Al-Ettifaq until 30 June 2027)

=== Former players ===
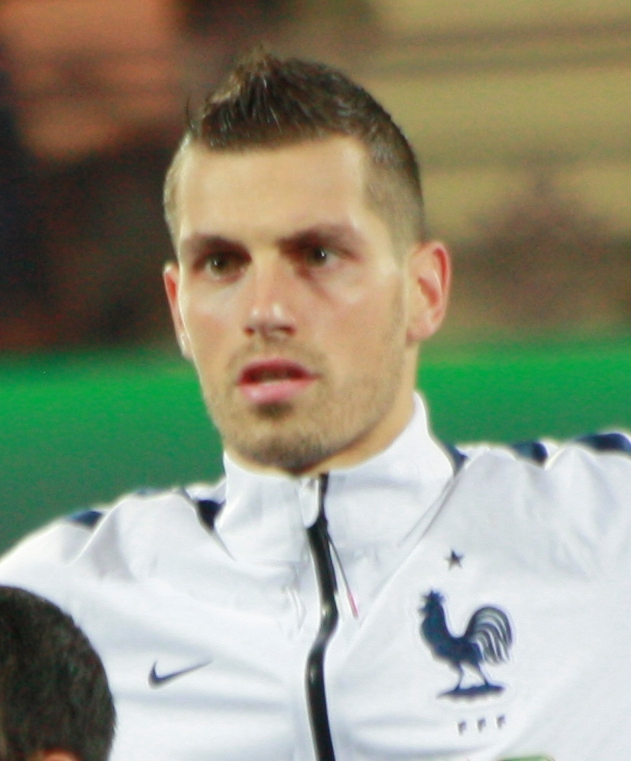
Morgan Schneiderlin played for France in the 2014 World Cup and has appeared for Southampton more than 250 times since leaving Strasbourg.

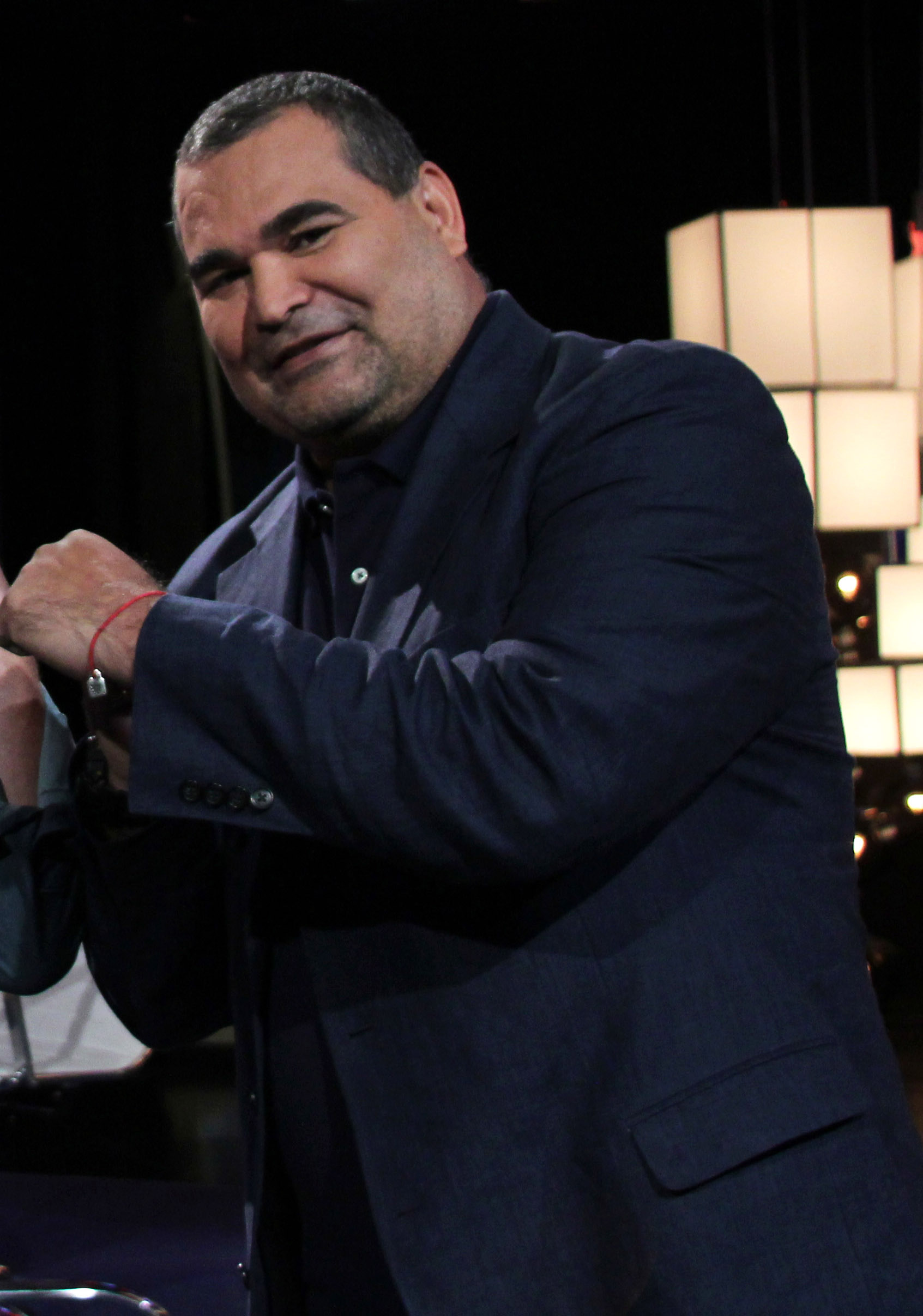
Paraguayan goalkeeper José Luis Chilavert won the 2001 Coupe de France with Strasbourg, scoring the winning penalty. He had some judiciary issues with the club after his departure, which were settled.

RCS does not have an official hall of fame or an all-time XI. Various selections have been made by press and supporters but none has achieved universal respect. 21 players have been capped for France while playing for Strasbourg. The most notable one is Oscar Heisserer who played a record 18 times with the national team while at Strasbourg and was the first Alsatian and first and only RCS player to wear the armband for France. Dominique Dropsy, Léonard Specht and Gérard Hausser also earned more than 10 caps while Marc Molitor is one of the rare examples of a player being capped for the national team while playing in the Division 2. Unsurprisingly, it is during the 1978–1979 title season that Racing had the most players included in the national squad. On 7 October 1978 were a record four RCS players (Dominique Dropsy, Roger Jouve, Francis Piasecki, Albert Gemmrich) on the field for a Euro 1980 qualifying game against Luxembourg. This figure was repeated a month later for a friendly against Spain (Dropsy, Piasecki, Gemmrich and Léonard Specht). Frank Leboeuf and Marc Keller were the last RCS players to earn a cap during the 1995–1996 season. Leboeuf is one of the two former RCS in the French team that won World Cup, the other one being Youri Djorkaeff.

Players to have once played for Strasbourg to have recently played for France include Olivier Dacourt and Richard Dutruel, (both in 2004). Furthermore, former France international midfielder Morgan Schneiderlin is a product of RC Strasbourg's Youth set-up, spending 14 years with the club before moving to Southampton after just five first-team appearances for Strasbourg. Schneiderlin then moved to Manchester United on 14 July 2015 before a move to Everton in January 2017.

With regional feelings still strong in Alsace, the performances of local players logically attract special attention. Seven out of the ten players with the most appearances for Racing are from Alsace: René Hauss (who holds the record), Léonard Specht, René Deutschmann, Edmond Haan, Gérard Hausser, Jean Schuth and Raymond Kaelbel. Since 1979, there is also a peculiar tradition that every Racing team to win a trophy or reach a final featured a Breton as captain, manager or both. Jacky Duguépéroux captained the 1979 team and won the Coupe de la Ligue in 1997 and 2005 as a manager. The 2001 Coupe de France winning team for itself included Yvon Pouliquen as manager and Corentin Martins as captain. Pouliquen also was the captain for the 1995 final.

Apart from French internationals and Alsatians, there is a strong tradition to have foreign players from Central and Eastern Europe at Strasbourg. The successful Racing team of the 1930s regularly included Austrians both as players and coaches, a tradition that was continued when Ernst Stojaspal played at la Meinau in the 1950s. Other Mitteleuropa players fondly remembered include Elek Schwartz, Ivica Osim, Ivan Hašek, Alexander Vencel or Danijel Ljuboja while Russian Aleksandr Mostovoi is the last world-class star to play for Racing to this date. Also, one of the greatest goalkeepers of all times, the Paraguayan José Luis Chilavert who, known for being three times selected IFFHS World's Best Goalkeeper and his free-kick abilities, won the 2001 Coupe de France with the club.

== Managers ==
Strasbourg has had 47 managers in the professional era, with the holder of the office changing 57 times. This is a record in French football only surpassed by Marseille. Gilbert Gress holds the record for the longest-serving manager at the club, both for a single spell (39 months between. 1977–80, 152 matches) and overall (75 months in three spells, 275 matches). Paul Frantz holds the record for the most spells at Racing with four (73 months overall, 227 matches). Jacky Duguépéroux is the only manager to win two trophies with the club.

=== Current coaching staff ===
Position	Name
Head coach	Vítor Matos
Assistant coach	Daniel Pacheco; Marco Pedroso; Gil Sousa
Goalkeeping coach	Miguel Miranda
Fitness coach	Dany Eberhardt
Youth coach	Martin Djetou; Guillaume Lacour
Video analyst	Hachim Ali M'Bae

== Honours ==
=== League ===
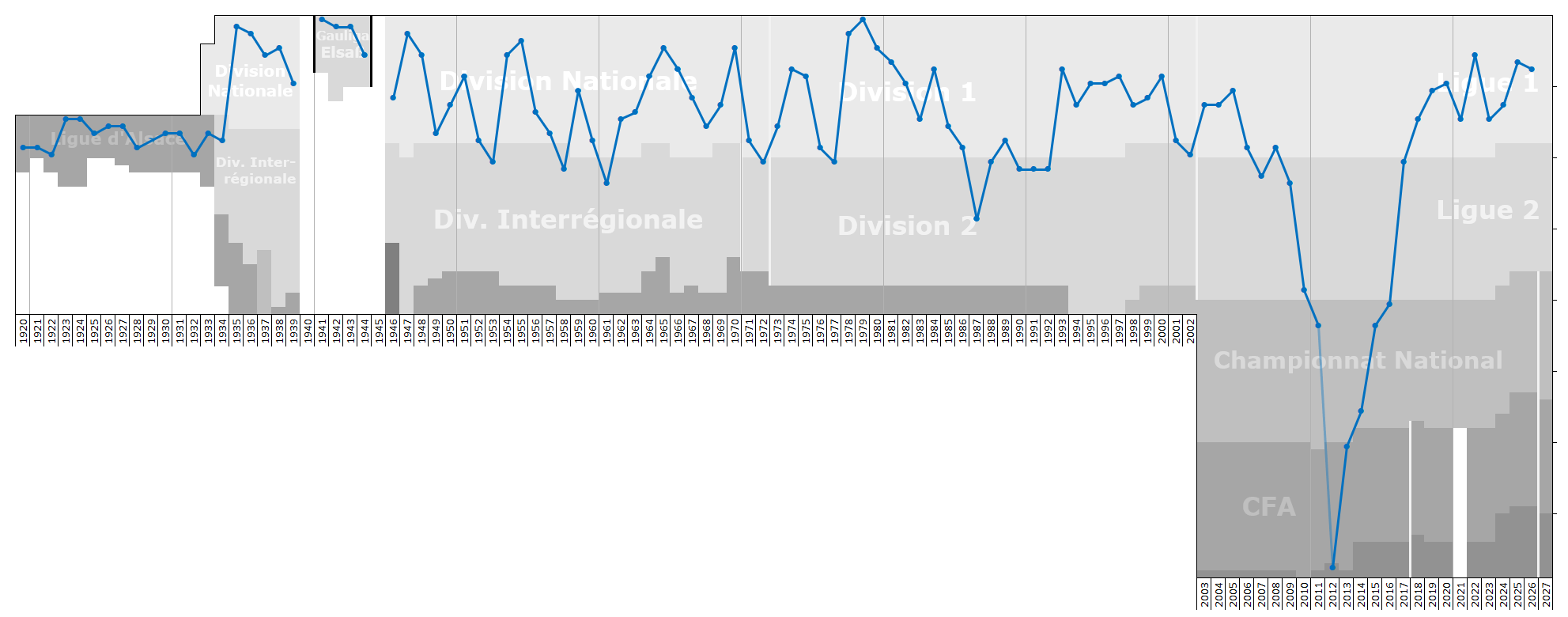
Historical league performance chart of RC Strasbourg

- Ligue 1
  - Winners: 1978–79
- Ligue 2
  - Winners: 1976–77, 1987–88, 2016–17
- Championnat National
  - Winners: 2015–16
- Championnat National 2
  - Winners: 2012–13
- Alsace Champions
  - Winners: 1923, 1924, 1926
- Dordogne Champions
  - Winners: 1940

=== Cups ===
- Coupe de France
  - Winners: 1950–51, 1965–66, 2000–01
- Coupe de la Ligue
  - Winners: 1963–64, 1996–97, 2004–05, 2018–19

=== Europe ===
- UEFA Intertoto Cup
  - Winners: 1995
- UEFA Conference League
  - 3rd Place (Semi-Finals): 2025–26

== Records ==
- Biggest victory: 10–0 (vs. Valenciennes, 1937–38)
- Biggest defeat: 0–8 (vs. Limoges, 1959–60)
- Biggest victory in European game: 5–0 (v. Grazer AK, 2005–06)
- Biggest defeat in European game: 2–10 (v. MTK Budapest, 1961–62)
- Record appearances: René Hauss (580; 421 in Ligue 1; between 1949 and 1969)
- Most consecutive appearances for the club: Dominique Dropsy (336; between 1973 and 1982)
- Most goals for the club: Oskar Rohr (118; between 1934 and 1939)
- Most goals for a single championship season at the club: Oskar Rohr (30; 1936–37)
- Oldest player: René Hauss (39 years, 351 days; vs. Nantes; 11 December 1966)
- Youngest player: Jacques Glassmann (16 years, 95 days vs. Nantes, 25 November 1978)
- Record attendance: 39,033, 20 November 1992, vs. Marseille
- Highest transfer fee paid: €22 million (to Club Brugge for Abakar Sylla in 2023)
- Highest transfer fee received: €18 million (from Al-Shabab for Habib Diallo in 2023)

== Bibliography ==
- Pierre Perny, Racing 100 ans, 2006, 350 p.
- Ronald Hirlé, Il était une fois le Racing, Toute l'histoire du club omnisport Strasbourgeois, 1991, 176 p.
- 100 ans de football en Alsace (tome 2) [100 years of soccer in Alsace (tome 2)] (in French). Strasbourg: LAFA. 2002. ISBN 2-911219-13-9.
- Wahl, Alfred (1989). Les archives du football [Soccer archives] (in French). Paris: Gallimard. ISBN 2-07-071603-1.
- Bitzer, Dirk; Wilting, Bernd (2003). Stürmen für Deutschland: Die Geschichte des deutschen Fußballs von 1933 bis 1954 [Storming for Germany: The History of German Football from 1933 to 1954] (in German). Campus Verlag GmbH. ISBN 978-3-593-37191-7.
- Descamps, Pierre-Marie; Ejnès, Gérard; Hennaux, Jacques (2007). Coupe de France: La folle épopée [Coupe de France: An epic journey] (in French). L'Équipe. ISBN 978-2-915535-62-4.
- Gauthey, Gilles (1961). Le football professionnel français [French professional soccer] (in French). Paris: Chez l'Auteur.
- Il était une fois le Racing, toute l'histoire du club omnisport strasbourgeois [Once upon a time, Racing, the history of Strasbourg's sports club] (in French). Ronald Hirlé, Berger-Levrault. 1991.
- Fuchs, Claude; Kieny, Gérard; Muller, Alphonse (2002). Les quatre vérités de Roland Weller [Roland Weller's four truths] (in French). Editions Coprur. ISBN 2-84208-103-X.
