= List of Ligue 1 hat-tricks =

Since the inception of the French football league competition, Ligue 1, in 1948, more than 200 players from 49 countries have scored three goals (a hat-trick) or more in a single match. The French former striker Thadée Cisowski is the player with the most Ligue 1 hat-tricks in history, with 22 scored between clubs Metz and RC Paris. The foreign players with the most hat-tricks are Gunnar Andersson of Sweden and Delio Onnis of Argentina, each of whom scored twelve. Algerian former footballer Ahmed Oudjani (in a 10–2 win for Lens against RC Paris on 8 December 1963), Malian former footballer Salif Keïta (in an 8–0 win for Saint-Étienne against Sedan on 4 June 1971) and Argentine former footballer Carlos Bianchi (in a 6–1 win for Reims against Paris Saint-Germain on 9 August 1974) each scored six goals in a match, the most ever scored in a single Ligue 1 game.

== Hat-tricks ==
Key
^{4}	Player scored four goals
^{5}	Player scored five goals
^{6}	Player scored six goals
†	Player scored hat-trick as a substitute
*	The home team

=== 1940s ===
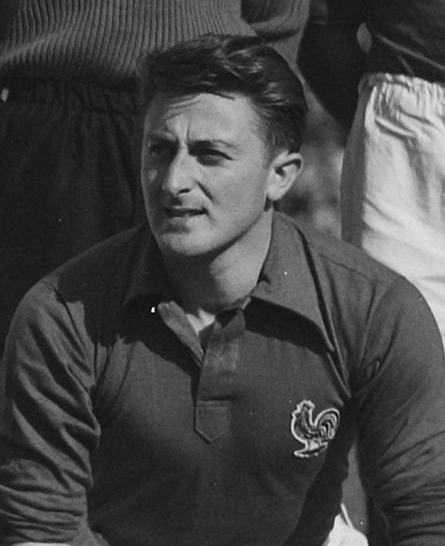
Pierre Flamion.

Player	Nationality	Position	For	Against	Result	Date	Ref.
Jean Grumellon^{4}	France	FW	Rennes	Metz*	6–1	22 August 1948	
Roger Planté	France	FW	Strasbourg*	FC Nancy	4–2	22 August 1948	
Roger Quenolle	France	FW	RC Paris	Montpellier*	4–0	29 August 1948	
André Strappe^{4}	France	MF	Lille	Reims*	4–2	5 September 1948	
Pierre Flamion^{4}	France	FW	Reims*	Metz	6–1	12 September 1948	
Jean Grumellon	France	FW	Rennes*	FC Nancy	4–0	3 October 1948	
Pierre Bini^{4}	France	MF	Reims*	Montpellier	6–4	3 October 1948	
Paul Perez	France	FW	Nice*	Sète	4–1	7 October 1948	
Joseph Humpal	Czechoslovakia	FW	Sochaux*	Sète	7–0	14 November 1948	
Pierre Dosséna	France	FW	Montpellier*	Metz	4–1	14 November 1948	
Thadée Cisowski	France	FW	Metz*	Sochaux	4–1	28 November 1948	
Jean Lauer	France	FW	Saint-Étienne*	Colmar	5–2	28 November 1948	
Jean Grumellon	France	FW	Rennes*	Metz	4–3	5 December 1948	
René Bihel^{4}	France	FW	Marseille	Roubaix-Tourcoing*	10–2	19 December 1948	
Jean Robin	France	FW	Marseille	Roubaix-Tourcoing*	10–2	19 December 1948	
Jean Baratte	France	FW	Lille*	Colmar	8–0	2 January 1949	
Marcel Lanfranchi	France	FW	Toulouse*	Saint-Étienne	5–1	16 January 1949	
André Voisembert	France	FW	FC Nancy*	RC Paris	3–1	23 January 1949	
Jean Lechantre	France	FW	Lille*	Metz	5–0	23 January 1949	
André Strappe^{5}	France	FW	Lille*	Cannes	6–1	20 February 1949	
Pierre Bini	France	FW	Reims	Roubaix-Tourcoing*	5–1	13 March 1949	
Abdelkader Hamiri	Morocco	FW	Cannes*	Colmar	4–2	17 April 1949	
Pierre Bini	France	FW	Reims*	Nice	6–1	15 May 1949	
Mohamed Mahjoub	Morocco	FW	Marseille*	Montpellier	6–3	29 May 1949	
Angelo Bollano	Italy	MF	Marseille*	Bordeaux	3–0	21 August 1949	
Jean Baratte	France	FW	Lille	Saint-Étienne*	4–3	21 August 1949	
Edmond Urbanski	France	FW	Toulouse*	Metz	8–2	11 September 1949	
Christian Bottollier	France	FW	FC Nancy	Saint-Étienne*	5–3	18 September 1949	
Jean Grumellon	France	FW	Rennes	Montpellier*	6–5	18 September 1949	
Michel Jacques	France	FW	Sochaux*	Sète	8–1	18 September 1949	
Roger Courtois	France	FW	Sochaux*	Saint-Étienne	6–2	23 October 1949	
Helge Bronee	Denmark	FW	FC Nancy*	Sète	4–0	6 November 1949	
Jean Baratte	France	FW	Lille*	Toulouse	4–1	6 November 1949	

=== 1950s ===
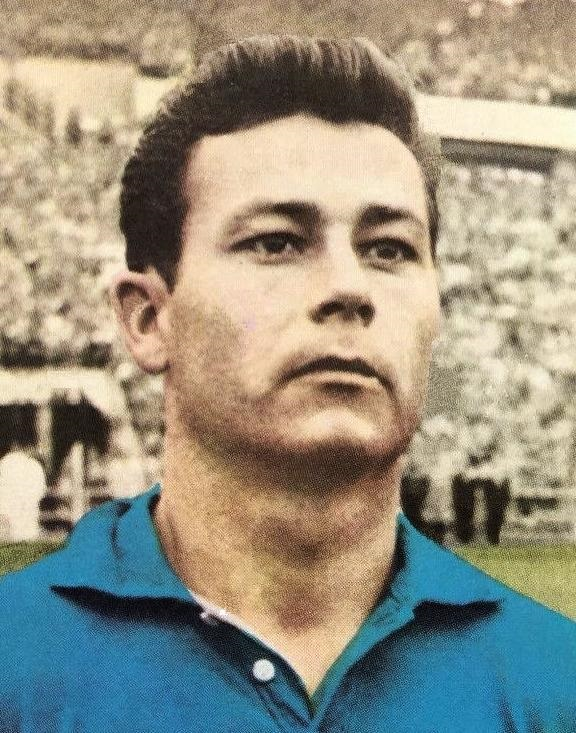
Just Fontaine.

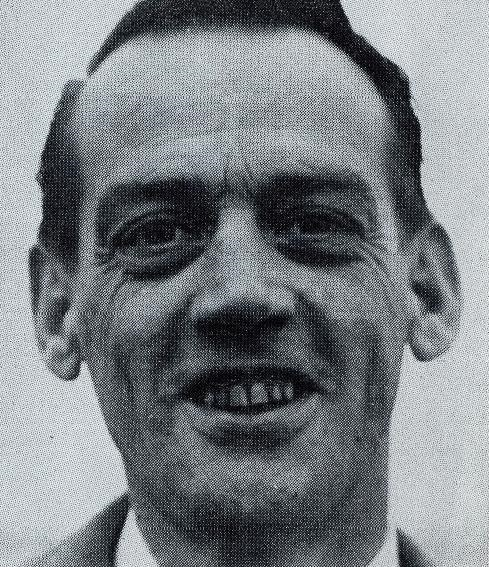
Gunnar Andersson.

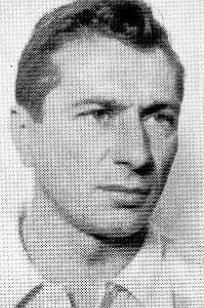
Thadée Cisowski.

Player	Nationality	Position	For	Against	Result	Date	Ref.
Bronislaw Sboralski	Poland	FW	Montpellier*	Lens	4–2	5 March 1950	
Pierre Flamion	France	FW	Reims*	Strasbourg	6–1	23 March 1950	
Joseph Ujlaki	France	FW	Sète*	Metz	4–1	23 March 1950	
Christian Bottollier	France	FW	FC Nancy*	Metz	7–2	30 April 1950	
Thadée Cisowski	France	FW	Metz*	Strasbourg	6–3	21 May 1950	
Pierre Wadoux	France	MF	RC Paris	Roubaix-Tourcoing*	3–1	21 May 1950	
Jean Combot	France	FW	Rennes*	Saint-Étienne	6–0	27 August 1950	
Jean Baratte	France	FW	Lille	Sochaux*	4–0	3 September 1950	
Albert Gudmundsson	Iceland	MF	RC Paris	Roubaix-Tourcoing*	4–1	3 September 1950	
Geoffrey Taylor	England	MF	Rennes	Nice*	6–3	3 September 1950	
Jean Grumellon	France	FW	Rennes*	Toulouse	6–0	10 September 1950	
Abraham Appel	Netherlands	FW	Reims	Toulouse*	3–1	29 October 1950	
Jean Tamini	Switzerland	FW	Saint-Étienne	Strasbourg*	6–2	19 November 1950	
Jean Courteaux	France	FW	Strasbourg*	Nice	4–1	26 November 1950	
Roger Piantoni	France	FW	FC Nancy*	Lens	4–2	24 December 1950	
Jean Saunier	France	FW	Le Havre	Strasbourg*	4–1	11 February 1951	
Robert Gangloff	France	FW	Strasbourg*	RC Paris	3–0	18 February 1951	
Charles Wagner	France	FW	Marseille*	Saint-Étienne	7–0	4 March 1951	
Per Uno Bengtsson	Sweden	FW	Nice*	RC Paris	3–0	11 March 1951	
Léon Deladerrière	France	FW	FC Nancy*	Marseille	5–1	11 March 1951	
Roger Piantoni^{5}	France	FW	FC Nancy*	Le Havre	6–1	1 April 1951	
Per Uno Bengtsson	Sweden	FW	Nice*	Lens	5–0	1 April 1951	
René Alpsteg^{4}	France	FW	Saint-Étienne*	Toulouse	4–0	22 April 1951	
Jean-Jacques Kretzschmar	France	FW	Roubaix-Tourcoing*	Sète	6–0	29 April 1951	
Léon Deladerrière^{4}	France	FW	FC Nancy*	Rennes	5–3	6 May 1951	
Jean Levandowski	France	FW	Lens	RC Paris*	3–1	20 May 1951	
Gunnar Andersson	Sweden	FW	Marseille*	Bordeaux	3–3	20 May 1951	
Émile Antonio	France	FW	Sète*	RC Paris	5–1	27 May 1951	
Roger Piantoni	France	FW	FC Nancy	Strasbourg*	5–1	27 May 1951	
Jean Baratte	France	FW	Lille*	Rennes	9–1	2 September 1951	
André Strappe	France	MF	Lille*	Rennes	9–1	2 September 1951	
René Alpsteg^{4}	France	FW	Saint-Étienne	Marseille*	10–3	16 September 1951	
Gunnar Andersson	Sweden	FW	Marseille*	Saint-Étienne	3–10	16 September 1951	
Jacques Foix	France	FW	RC Paris*	Marseille	5–1	23 September 1951	
Édouard Kargu	France	FW	Bordeaux*	Lyon	6–1	30 September 1951	
Per Uno Bengtsson	Sweden	FW	Nice*	Lyon	6–1	4 November 1951	
Jacques Foix	France	FW	RC Paris*	Reims	5–2	11 November 1951	
Edmond Plewa	France	FW	FC Nancy*	Rennes	9–1	18 November 1951	
Roger Piantoni^{4}	France	FW	FC Nancy*	Rennes	9–1	18 November 1951	
Abraham Appel	Netherlands	FW	Reims*	Marseille	8–1	25 November 1951	
Raymond Kopa	France	MF	Reims*	Marseille	8–1	25 November 1951	
Bertus de Harder	Netherlands	FW	Bordeaux*	Saint-Étienne	9–0	25 November 1951	
André Lukac	Czechoslovakia	FW	Bordeaux*	Saint-Étienne	9–0	25 November 1951	
Léon Deladerrière^{4}	France	FW	FC Nancy*	RC Paris	6–3	2 December 1951	
Wilhelm van Lent	Netherlands	FW	Lens*	Strasbourg	5–1	2 December 1951	
Bertus de Harder	Netherlands	FW	Bordeaux*	Marseille	6–1	2 December 1951	
Jean Vincent	France	FW	Lille*	Sochaux	7–3	9 December 1951	
Gunnar Andersson	Sweden	FW	Marseille*	Metz	4–0	30 December 1951	
Jean Saunier	France	FW	Le Havre	RC Paris*	6–2	30 December 1951	
Albert Gudmundsson	Iceland	FW	RC Paris*	Lyon	4–0	20 January 1952	
Marcel Rouvière	France	FW	Nîmes*	Saint-Étienne	5–1	27 January 1952	
Lucien Genet	France	FW	Lyon*	Lens	4–1	20 March 1952	
Thadée Cisowski	France	FW	Metz*	Roubaix-Tourcoing	3–0	23 March 1952	
Léon Deladerrière	France	FW	FC Nancy	Lille*	3–0	23 March 1952	
Bertus de Harder	Netherlands	FW	Bordeaux*	Lens	4–1	30 March 1952	
Marcel Rouvière^{5}	France	FW	Nîmes*	Rennes	7–0	11 May 1952	
Gunnar Andersson	Sweden	FW	Marseille*	Bordeaux	6–0	18 May 1952	
Jean-Louis Reignier	France	FW	Sochaux	Reims*	5–1	18 May 1952	
Robert Baucomont	France	MF	Stade Français	Sochaux*	3–1	11 September 1952	
Marcel Rouvière	France	FW	Nîmes*	Montpellier	4–2	11 September 1952	
Gunnar Andersson^{4}	Sweden	FW	Marseille*	FC Nancy	4–3	5 October 1952	
François Ludo	France	DF	Lens*	Rennes	5–0	12 October 1952	
Roger Vandooren^{4}	France	FW	Stade Français*	RC Paris	5–0	26 October 1952	
Abdesselem Ben Mohammed	France	FW	Bordeaux*	Nîmes	3–2	23 November 1952	
Gunnar Andersson	Sweden	FW	Marseille*	Roubaix-Tourcoing	4–2	14 December 1952	
Georges Dupraz	France	FW	Montpellier	Stade Français*	4–2	21 December 1952	
Abdesselem Ben Mohammed	France	FW	Bordeaux*	Rennes	7–0	4 January 1953	
Édouard Salzborn	France	MF	Sochaux*	Bordeaux	8–2	11 January 1953	
Gunnar Andersson	Sweden	FW	Marseille*	Bordeaux	3–0	25 January 1953	
Armando Martins	Brazil	MF	Lens*	Sochaux	5–1	22 March 1953	
Abdesselem Ben Mohammed	France	FW	Bordeaux*	Montpellier	6–0	22 March 1953	
Abraham Appel	Netherlands	FW	Reims	Stade Français*	5–1	17 May 1953	
Édouard Kargu	France	FW	Bordeaux*	Sète	3–0	24 May 1953	
André Schwager	France	FW	Nîmes	Marseille*	4–0	23 August 1953	
Jean-Paul Derousseau	France	MF	Lille*	Nice	3–1	6 September 1953	
Julien Stopyra	France	FW	Lens*	Nîmes	4–1	27 September 1953	
Gunnar Andersson	Sweden	FW	Marseille*	Monaco	5–1	11 October 1953	
Michel Hidalgo	France	MF	Le Havre	Sète*	4–4	11 October 1953	
Édouard Kargu^{4}	France	FW	Bordeaux*	Monaco	4–3	25 October 1953	
Wilhelm van Lent	Netherlands	FW	Lens*	Marseille	4–1	25 October 1953	
Gunnar Andersson	Sweden	FW	Marseille*	Strasbourg	5–1	15 November 1953	
René Linkenheld	France	FW	Metz*	Roubaix-Tourcoing	4–2	13 December 1953	
Ferenc Kocsur	France	MF	Saint-Étienne*	FC Nancy	3–1	13 December 1953	
Robert Bahl	France	FW	Roubaix-Tourcoing*	Nîmes	4–2	27 December 1953	
Just Fontaine^{5}	France	FW	Nice*	Lens	6–1	3 January 1954	
Eduardo Di Loreto	Argentina	FW	Le Havre*	Sète	10–0	31 January 1954	
Jean-Jacques Kretzschmar	France	FW	Sète	Saint-Étienne*	3–6	28 February 1954	
Roger Scotti	France	MF	Marseille	Nice*	4–2	21 March 1954	
Eduardo Di Loreto	Argentina	FW	Le Havre	Bordeaux*	4–1	21 March 1954	
Édouard Salzborn	France	MF	Sochaux*	Strasbourg	7–1	15 April 1954	
Ake Hjalmarsson	Sweden	FW	Lyon	Nice*	3–7	22 August 1954	
Jean Vincent	France	FW	Lille*	RC Paris	6–0	22 August 1954	
Ernst Stojaspal	Austria	FW	Strasbourg	FC Nancy*	5–1	22 August 1954	
Gunnar Andersson	Sweden	FW	Marseille*	Roubaix-Tourcoing	5–2	5 September 1954	
Karl Decker	Austria	MF	Sochaux*	RC Paris	3–2	9 September 1954	
Ernst Stojaspal	Austria	FW	Strasbourg*	Nice	7–1	12 September 1954	
Bart Carlier	Netherlands	FW	Strasbourg*	Nice	7–1	12 September 1954	
Édouard Kargu	France	FW	Bordeaux*	Nice	7–2	26 September 1954	
Jacques Foix^{4}	France	FW	Saint-Étienne*	Strasbourg	5–1	3 October 1954	
Pierre Flamion^{4}	France	FW	Troyes	Roubaix-Tourcoing*	6–1	24 October 1954	
Abdesselem Ben Mohammed	France	FW	Bordeaux*	Lille	4–2	21 November 1954	
Jacques Faivre	France	FW	Sochaux*	Marseille	4–0	12 December 1954	
Erich Habitzl	Austria	MF	Lens*	Sochaux	6–2	16 January 1955	
Alberto Muro	Argentina	FW	Sochaux*	Roubaix-Tourcoing	5–0	23 January 1955	
Ernst Stojaspal	Austria	FW	Strasbourg*	Saint-Étienne	5–0	13 February 1955	
René Bliard	France	FW	Reims	RC Paris*	5–2	13 February 1955	
Bruno Zboralski	France	FW	Lens*	Roubaix-Tourcoing	4–3	20 February 1955	
Jean Hédiart	France	FW	FC Nancy*	Troyes	4–1	20 February 1955	
Mohammed Abderrazack	Morocco	FW	Nice*	Sochaux	4–0	27 February 1955	
Édouard Kargu	France	FW	Bordeaux	Troyes*	3–1	20 March 1955	
Roger Piantoni	France	FW	FC Nancy*	Metz	7–0	20 March 1955	
Stéphane Bruey	France	FW	Monaco*	Lens	6–0	20 March 1955	
Joseph Emile Lorentz	France	FW	FC Nancy	Bordeaux*	3–2	10 April 1955	
Pierre Flamion	France	FW	Troyes*	Marseille	4–2	24 April 1955	
Thadée Cisowski	France	FW	RC Paris	Nîmes*	5–1	21 August 1955	
Thadée Cisowski	France	FW	RC Paris	Strasbourg*	4–1	11 September 1955	
Laurent Robuschi	France	FW	Monaco	Troyes*	5–2	11 September 1955	
François Milazzo	France	MF	Nice*	Lille	7–1	18 September 1955	
René Bliard	France	FW	Reims*	Bordeaux	3–0	30 October 1955	
Henri Skiba^{4}	France	FW	Strasbourg	Toulouse*	4–4	30 October 1955	
Antoine Keller	France	FW	FC Nancy*	Sedan	4–2	30 October 1955	
Gérard Bourbotte	France	FW	Lille*	Troyes	4–0	6 November 1955	
Hassan Akesbi^{4}	Morocco	FW	Nîmes*	Troyes	5–2	13 November 1955	
Gunnar Andersson	Sweden	FW	Marseille	Lille*	3–0	11 December 1955	
Abdesselem Ben Mohammed	France	FW	Nîmes*	Monaco	6–2	15 January 1956	
Robert Lemaître	France	DF	Lille*	RC Paris	6–1	22 January 1956	
Thadée Cisowski	France	FW	RC Paris	Marseille*	4–1	18 March 1956	
Ernest Schultz	France	FW	Lyon	Troyes*	3–1	18 March 1956	
Thadée Cisowski	France	FW	RC Paris	Bordeaux*	4–1	1 April 1956	
Michel Hidalgo	France	MF	Reims*	Strasbourg	6–2	22 April 1956	
René Bliard	France	FW	Reims	Troyes*	3–2	1 May 1956	
Rachid Mekloufi	Algeria	FW	Saint-Étienne	Bordeaux*	3–4	1 May 1956	
Bernard Lefèvre	France	MF	Lille	Troyes*	6–1	20 May 1956	
Egon Jönsson	Sweden	MF	Lens	Metz*	5–1	19 August 1956	
Rachid Mekloufi	Algeria	FW	Saint-Étienne*	Marseille	6–3	26 August 1956	
Thadée Cisowski^{4}	France	FW	RC Paris*	Angers	6–2	26 August 1956	
Just Fontaine	France	FW	Reims*	Monaco	5–1	4 September 1956	
Henri Skiba	France	FW	Strasbourg*	Valenciennes	6–0	9 September 1956	
Eugène N'Jo Léa	Cameroon	FW	Saint-Étienne	Sedan*	6–2	16 September 1956	
Thadée Cisowski^{4}	France	FW	RC Paris*	Lens	5–0	16 September 1956	
Rachid Mekloufi	Algeria	FW	Saint-Étienne	Reims*	5–4	30 September 1956	
Just Fontaine	France	FW	Reims*	Saint-Étienne	4–5	30 September 1956	
Thadée Cisowski	France	FW	RC Paris*	FC Nancy	6–1	30 September 1956	
René Dereuddre	France	MF	Toulouse*	Angers*	5–2	28 October 1956	
Abdelhamid Bouchouk	Algeria	FW	Toulouse*	Rennes	6–0	18 November 1956	
Thadée Cisowski	France	FW	RC Paris	Sochaux*	5–3	18 November 1956	
Eugène N'Jo Léa	Cameroon	FW	Saint-Étienne*	Sochaux	6–0	25 November 1956	
Rachid Mekloufi	Algeria	FW	Saint-Étienne*	Sochaux	6–0	25 November 1956	
Antoine Keller	France	FW	Monaco	Strasbourg*	4–2	25 November 1956	
Ginès Liron^{4}	France	FW	Sochaux*	Strasbourg	6–0	9 December 1956	
Egon Jönsson	Sweden	MF	Lens*	Toulouse	4–1	16 December 1956	
Christian Amand	France	FW	Nice*	Nîmes	5–2	6 January 1957	
Jean-Marie Courtin	France	FW	Lens*	Sochaux	3–1	10 February 1957	
Gunnar Andersson^{4}	Sweden	FW	Marseille*	Saint-Étienne	3–4	17 March 1957	
Rachid Mekloufi	Algeria	FW	Saint-Étienne	Marseille*	3–4	17 March 1957	
Egon Jönsson	Sweden	MF	Lens	Nîmes*	3–2	31 March 1957	
Bruno Bollini	France	DF/MF	RC Paris*	Toulouse	6–2	12 May 1957	
Hassan Akesbi	Morocco	FW	Nîmes*	Angers	3–1	12 May 1957	
Édouard Stako	France	MF	Valenciennes	FC Nancy*	4–1	12 May 1957	
Thadée Cisowski	France	FW	RC Paris*	Sochaux	6–4	18 August 1957	
Serge Roy	France	FW	Monaco*	Sochaux	5–2	25 August 1957	
Léon Glovacki	France	FW	Monaco*	Reims	3–0	8 September 1957	
Alberto Muro	Argentina	FW	Nice*	Sedan	8–0	15 September 1957	
Jacques Foix	France	FW	Nice*	Sedan	8–0	15 September 1957	
Just Fontaine	France	FW	Reims*	Lyon	4–0	15 September 1957	
Just Fontaine	France	FW	Reims*	Béziers	5–0	29 September 1957	
Serge Roy	France	FW	Monaco*	Valenciennes	4–0	13 October 1957	
Thadée Cisowski	France	FW	RC Paris	Valenciennes*	5–0	1 November 1957	
Just Fontaine	France	FW	Reims*	Alès	4–2	24 November 1957	
Jean Guillot	France	MF/FW	RC Paris*	Sedan	4–2	1 December 1957	
Fernand Devlaminck^{4}	France	FW	Lille*	Béziers	10–1	8 December 1957	
François Heutte	France	FW	Lille*	Béziers	10–1	8 December 1957	
Abdelhamid Kermali	Algeria	FW	Lyon	RC Paris*	4–2	29 December 1957	
Yngve Brodd^{5}	Sweden	FW	Sochaux*	RC Paris	5–0	5 January 1958	
Henri Skiba	France	FW	Nîmes*	Marseille	5–0	5 January 1958	
Just Fontaine	France	FW	Reims*	Sochaux	3–1	9 February 1958	
Just Fontaine	France	FW	Reims	RC Paris*	5–1	16 February 1958	
Célestin Oliver	France	FW	Sedan*	Béziers	8–4	16 February 1958	
Joseph Ujlaki	France	FW	Nice*	Sochaux	4–3	23 February 1958	
Roger Piantoni^{4}	France	FW	Reims	Sedan*	5–2	23 March 1958	
François Milazzo	France	MF	Nice*	Saint-Étienne	6–1	1 May 1958	
Just Fontaine^{4}	France	FW	Reims	Valenciennes*	6–0	1 May 1958	
Jean Tokpa	Ivory Coast	FW	Alès	Sochaux*	5–4	17 August 1958	
Ignace Wognin	Ivory Coast	FW	Angers*	Valenciennes	4–0	17 August 1958	
Roger Piantoni	France	FW	Reims	FC Nancy*	5–3	17 August 1958	
Thadée Cisowski	France	FW	RC Paris*	FC Nancy	4–4	24 August 1958	
Just Fontaine^{4}	France	FW	Reims*	Rennes	4–0	27 August 1958	
Thadée Cisowski^{4}	France	FW	RC Paris	Lille*	6–1	27 August 1958	
Antoine Cuissard	France	MF	Rennes*	Angers	3–0	31 August 1958	
Thadée Cisowski	France	FW	RC Paris*	Lens	5–0	31 August 1958	
Maxime Fulgenzy^{4}	France	FW	Sedan*	Saint-Étienne	5–0	7 September 1958	
Henri Skiba	France	FW	Nîmes	Alès*	4–0	27 September 1958	
Hassan Akesbi	Morocco	FW	Nîmes	Strasbourg*	5–1	19 October 1958	
Fernand Devlaminck^{4}	France	FW	Lille*	Valenciennes	6–1	2 November 1958	
Roger Piantoni^{5}	France	FW	Reims	Alès*	6–3	16 November 1958	
Alain Jubert	France	FW	FC Nancy*	Lyon	4–3	4 January 1959	
Hassan Akesbi	Morocco	FW	Nîmes	Toulouse*	4–2	15 February 1959	
Michel Lefèbvre	France	MF	Sedan*	Valenciennes	4–0	15 February 1959	
Monday Ossey	Gabon	FW	Limoges*	Lille	5–0	8 March 1959	
Thadée Cisowski	France	FW	RC Paris*	Alès	5–2	8 March 1959	
Claude Bourrigault	France	MF	Angers	Nîmes*	3–5	8 March 1959	
Victor Nurenberg	Luxembourg	FW	Nice	Rennes*	3–0	5 April 1959	
Mahi Khennane	Algeria	FW	Rennes*	Sedan	3–1	26 April 1959	
Jacques Foix	France	FW	Nice	Saint-Étienne*	4–3	7 May 1959	
Thadée Cisowski^{4}	France	FW	RC Paris*	Lille	7–2	10 May 1959	
Victor Nurenberg	Luxembourg	FW	Nice*	Sochaux	5–0	10 May 1959	
Michel Lafranceschina	France	FW	Lens	Alès*	6–2	24 May 1959	
Just Fontaine	France	FW	Reims*	Sochaux	4–1	16 August 1959	
Thadée Cisowski^{4}	France	FW	RC Paris*	Le Havre	9–0	23 August 1959	
Keita Omar Barrou	Mali	FW	Nice*	Sochaux	3–0	23 August 1959	
Henri Skiba^{4}	France	FW	Nîmes*	Toulon	4–1	23 August 1959	
Pierre Dumas	France	MF	Stade Français	Strasbourg*	5–2	23 August 1959	
Jean Tokpa^{5}	Ivory Coast	FW	RC Paris*	Toulon	7–1	6 September 1959	
Hassan Akesbi	Morocco	FW	Nîmes*	Monaco	5–1	16 September 1959	
Robert Bérard	France	FW	Reims	Lens*	5–2	20 September 1959	
Just Fontaine^{4}	France	FW	Reims*	Bordeaux	8–2	4 October 1959	
Roger Piantoni^{4}	France	FW	Reims*	Bordeaux	8–2	4 October 1959	
Hassan Akesbi^{4}	Morocco	FW	Nîmes*	Nice	5–1	4 October 1959	
Ginès Liron	France	FW	Saint-Étienne*	Strasbourg	7–3	4 October 1959	
Yvon-Raymond Lubiato	France	FW	Valenciennes*	Toulouse	5–3	11 October 1959	
Laurent Robuschi	France	MF/FW	Bordeaux*	Sochaux	6–4	11 October 1959	
Thadée Cisowski	France	FW	RC Paris	Stade Français*	3–3	18 October 1959	
Yvon-Raymond Lubiato	France	FW	Valenciennes	Bordeaux*	7–3	25 October 1959	
Michel Hidalgo	France	MF	Monaco*	Bordeaux	5–0	29 October 1959	
Just Fontaine	France	FW	Reims	Saint-Étienne*	5–2	1 November 1959	
Keita Omar Barrou^{4}	Mali	FW	Nice*	Toulon	4–2	1 November 1959	
Joseph Ujlaki	France	FW	RC Paris*	Sochaux	8–0	29 November 1959	
Ernest Schultz	France	FW	Toulouse	Sedan*	4–3	29 November 1959	
Laurent Robuschi	France	MF/FW	Bordeaux*	Monaco	4–2	6 December 1959	
Monday Ossey	Gabon	FW	Rennes*	Strasbourg	4–0	27 December 1959	

=== 1960s ===
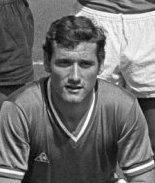
Hervé Revelli.

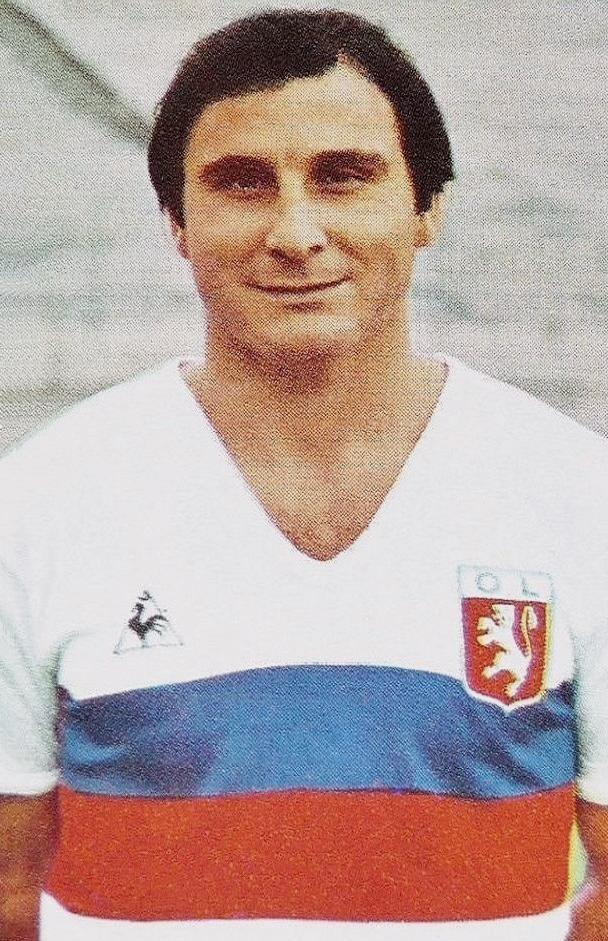
Fleury Di Nallo.

Player	Nationality	Position	For	Against	Result	Date	Ref.
Guy Hatchi	France	MF	Limoges*	Strasbourg	8–0	17 January 1960	
Egon Jönsson	Sweden	MF	Toulon	Rennes*	3–3	31 January 1960	
Ahmed Oudjani	Algeria	FW	Lens*	Bordeaux	3–1	7 February 1960	
Thadée Cisowski	France	FW	RC Paris	Toulon*	3–1	21 February 1960	
Thadée Cisowski	France	FW	RC Paris*	Valenciennes	6–4	1 May 1960	
Roger Piantoni	France	FW	Reims*	Le Havre	8–2	29 May 1960	
François Heutte	France	FW	RC Paris	Sochaux*	6–3	29 May 1960	
Eugène N'Jo Léa	Cameroon	FW	Lyon*	Rennes	4–0	27 August 1960	
Petrus van Rhijn	Netherlands	FW	Stade Français*	Saint-Étienne	5–0	27 August 1960	
Mohamed Salem	Algeria	FW	Sedan*	Rouen	4–0	27 August 1960	
François Heutte	France	FW	RC Paris*	Grenoble	6–3	4 September 1960	
Héctor De Bourgoing	Argentina; France	MF	Nice	Stade Français*	3–1	15 September 1960	
Alphonse Cassar	France	MF	Nîmes	Sedan*	3–1	15 September 1960	
Jean Vincent	France	FW	Reims*	Nîmes	5–1	6 November 1960	
Antoine Keller	France	FW	Troyes*	Stade Français	5–3	6 November 1960	
Lucien Cossou	France	FW	Monaco*	Rennes	3–0	11 November 1960	
Mohamed Salem	Algeria	FW	Sedan*	Grenoble	3–0	27 November 1960	
André Hess	France	MF	Monaco	FC Nancy*	4–0	27 November 1960	
Héctor De Bourgoing	Argentina; France	MF	Nice	Troyes*	5–0	25 December 1960	
Yvon Goujon	France	MF	Limoges*	Stade Français	4–3	21 January 1961	
Jacques Meyer	France	FW	Rouen*	Toulouse	7–0	5 February 1961	
Antoine Keller	France	FW	Troyes*	Sedan	3–7	5 February 1961	
Maxime Fulgenzy	France	FW	Sedan	Troyes*	7–3	5 February 1961	
Yannick Lebert	France	FW	Sedan	Troyes*	7–3	5 February 1961	
Jean-Jacques Marcel	France	MF	RC Paris*	Limoges	3–1	19 March 1961	
Jacques Faivre	France	FW	Rennes*	Lens	4–2	19 March 1961	
Alberto Muro	France	FW	FC Nancy	Nîmes*	4–3	23 April 1961	
Yvon Douis	France	FW	Le Havre*	Troyes	5–2	11 May 1961	
Jean-Claude Lavaud	France	DF	Rennes*	Lyon	6–1	14 May 1961	
Edmond Boulle	France	FW	Grenoble*	Sedan	6–3	4 June 1961	
Roger Piantoni	France	FW	Reims*	Lens	4–1	20 August 1961	
Joseph Ujlaki	France	FW	RC Paris*	Angers	4–3	27 August 1961	
Jean-Jacques Marcel	France	MF	RC Paris*	Le Havre	4–1	10 September 1961	
Lucien Cossou	France	FW	Monaco*	Montpellier	5–3	1 October 1961	
Michel Perchey^{4}	France	FW	Nîmes	RC Paris*	4–0	22 October 1961	
Gérard Leroy	France	MF	Sochaux*	Le Havre	6–1	1 November 1961	
Michel Lafranceschina	France	FW	Lens*	Montpellier	5–1	1 November 1961	
Joseph Ujlaki	France	FW	RC Paris*	Metz	11–2	23 November 1961	
François Heutte	France	FW	RC Paris*	Metz	11–2	23 November 1961	
Yvon Goujon	France	MF	Rennes*	Monaco	4–6	14 January 1962	
Serge Roy	France	FW	Monaco	Rennes*	6–4	14 January 1962	
Casimir Koza	France	FW	Strasbourg	RC Paris*	3–3	11 February 1962	
Casimir Koza	France	FW	Strasbourg*	Lyon	5–2	26 February 1962	
Alain Jubert	France	FW	Toulouse*	Strasbourg	4–1	28 March 1962	
Jean-Pierre Thomas	France	FW	Angers*	Nîmes	8–3	1 April 1962	
Jacques Foix	France	FW	Toulouse*	Sochaux	6–1	22 April 1962	
Paul Sauvage	France	FW	Reims*	Strasbourg	5–1	20 May 1962	
Sékou Touré	Ivory Coast	FW	Montpellier*	Saint-Étienne	4–3	20 May 1962	
Hassan Akesbi	Morocco	FW	Reims*	Lyon	5–1	26 August 1962	
Claude Dubaële	France	MF/FW	Reims*	FC Nancy	5–1	19 September 1962	
Yvon Giner	France	FW	Nice*	Montpellier	3–1	23 September 1962	
Hassan Akesbi	Morocco	FW	Reims	Grenoble*	3–0	4 October 1962	
Angel Segurola	Spain	FW	Bordeaux	Lens*	3–3	13 October 1962	
Ahmed Oudjani	Algeria	FW	Lens	Marseille*	3–3	14 October 1962	
Hassan Akesbi	Morocco	FW	Reims*	Stade Français	6–2	1 November 1962	
Serge Masnaghetti	France	FW	Valenciennes*	RC Paris	4–0	18 November 1962	
Néstor Combin	France	FW	Lyon	Strasbourg*	3–0	18 November 1962	
Guy Van Sam	France	FW	RC Paris*	Reims	3–3	25 November 1962	
Serge Masnaghetti	France	FW	Valenciennes	Montpellier*	4–0	25 November 1962	
Lucien Cossou^{4}	France	MF	Monaco*	Rennes	5–0	2 December 1962	
Aimé Gori^{5}	France	MF	Bordeaux*	Rennes	6–0	30 December 1962	
Maryan Wisnieski	France	FW	Lens	FC Nancy*	3–1	30 December 1962	
Lucien Cossou	France	FW	Monaco*	Reims	5–2	7 January 1963	
Roger Piantoni	France	FW	Reims*	Rouen	4–0	13 January 1963	
Guy Van Sam	France	FW	RC Paris*	Marseille	3–0	27 January 1963	
Ramon Muller	Argentina	FW	Strasbourg*	Nice	7–0	27 January 1963	
Rachid Mekloufi	Algeria	FW	Saint-Étienne*	Boulogne	4–3	10 February 1963	
Héctor De Bourgoing	Argentina; France	MF	Nice	RC Paris*	4–3	17 March 1963	
Mohamed Salem	Algeria	FW	Sedan	Strasbourg*	5–1	24 March 1963	
Rachid Mekloufi	Algeria	FW	Saint-Étienne	CA Paris*	4–0	7 April 1963	
Giovanni Pellegrini	France	FW	Rennes*	Lens	4–2	7 April 1963	
Yvon Douis	France	FW	Monaco*	Nice	6–2	7 April 1963	
Rachid Mekloufi	Algeria	FW	Saint-Étienne*	Toulon	3–1	21 April 1963	
Jean-Pierre Thomas	France	FW	Angers	RC Paris*	4–2	21 April 1963	
Salah Djebaïli^{4}	Algeria	MF	Nîmes*	Nice	6–3	21 April 1963	
Ahmed Oudjani	Algeria	FW	Lens*	Marseille	8–1	28 April 1963	
Lucien Cossou	France	FW	Monaco	Toulouse*	5–0	1 May 1963	
Serge Masnaghetti	France	FW	Valenciennes	Stade Français*	3–1	1 May 1963	
Maurice Charpentier^{5}	France	MF	RC Paris*	Montpellier	9–1	19 May 1963	
Néstor Combin	France	FW	Lyon	Nice*	5–3	19 May 1963	
Mahi Khennane	Algeria	FW	Toulouse*	Valenciennes	5–1	25 May 1963	
Edmond Baraffe	France	FW	Toulouse	Nice*	4–2	1 September 1963	
Ángel Rambert	France	FW	Lyon*	Saint-Étienne	4–5	22 September 1963	
Jean Deloffre	France	MF	Lens*	Stade Français	3–0	6 October 1963	
Héctor De Bourgoing	Argentina; France	MF	Bordeaux*	Nice	6–2	13 November 1963	
Bert Carlier	Netherlands	FW	Monaco*	Toulouse	5–0	13 November 1963	
Francis Magny	France	FW	RC Paris*	Nîmes	5–0	17 November 1963	
Néstor Combin	France	FW	Lyon*	Monaco	5–1	24 November 1963	
Ahmed Oudjani^{6}	Algeria	FW	Lens*	RC Paris	10–2	8 December 1963	
Roger Lemerre	France	DF	Sedan*	Nice	8–1	15 December 1963	
Lucien Cossou^{4}	France	FW	Monaco*	Lens	5–0	29 December 1963	
André Guy^{4}	France	FW	Saint-Étienne*	Toulouse	7–1	26 January 1964	
Néstor Combin	France	FW	Lyon*	Rennes	4–1	23 February 1964	
Jean Deloffre^{4}	France	MF	Lens*	Bordeaux	8–1	8 March 1964	
Serge Masnaghetti	France	FW	Valenciennes	Bordeaux*	3–0	15 March 1964	
Salah Djebaïli	Algeria	MF	Nîmes*	Rennes	3–1	15 March 1964	
Fleury Di Nallo	France	FW	Lyon*	RC Paris	5–1	5 April 1964	
Jacques Foix	France	FW	Saint-Étienne*	Bordeaux	4–0	29 April 1964	
Jacques Simon	France	MF	Nantes*	Rouen	7–1	29 April 1964	
Joseph Bonnel	France	MF	Valenciennes*	Rouen	3–0	30 August 1964	
Francis Magny	France	FW	Lille*	Monaco	3–0	6 September 1964	
Serge Tulik	France	FW	Angers	Lille*	4–3	22 November 1964	
Serge Masnaghetti	France	FW	Valenciennes*	Monaco	3–0	29 November 1964	
Paul Sauvage^{4}	France	FW	Valenciennes*	Lens	6–1	7 February 1965	
Rafael Santos	Argentina	FW	Nantes*	Toulouse	3–0	21 March 1965	
José Farías	Argentina	MF	Strasbourg	Rouen*	3–1	28 March 1965	
Yvon Douis	France	FW	Monaco	Toulon*	6–0	25 April 1965	
Edmond Baraffe	France	FW	Toulouse	Nîmes*	4–0	8 May 1965	
Jean Guillot	France	FW	Nantes*	Lyon	3–0	8 May 1965	
Daniel Rodighiéro	France	FW	Rennes*	Rouen	4–0	16 May 1965	
Philippe Gondet	France	FW	Nantes*	Lens	4–2	28 August 1965	
Robert Herbin^{5}	France	MF	Saint-Étienne	Cannes*	8–2	10 September 1965	
Fleury Di Nallo	France	FW	Lyon*	Lille	6–3	10 September 1965	
Robert Traba	France	FW	Lyon*	Lille	6–3	10 September 1965	
José Farías	Argentina	MF	Strasbourg*	Red Star	7–1	10 September 1965	
Claude Brény	France	FW	Sedan*	Cannes	3–1	18 September 1965	
Philippe Gondet^{4}	France	FW	Nantes*	Red Star	7–2	20 October 1965	
Michel Lafranceschina	France	FW	Sochaux*	Lyon	7–2	24 October 1965	
Rachid Mekloufi	Algeria	FW	Saint-Étienne*	Lille	7–4	24 October 1965	
Maryan Wisnieski	France	FW	Saint-Étienne*	Lille	7–4	24 October 1965	
André Guy	France	FW	Lille	Saint-Étienne*	4–7	24 October 1965	
Mohamed Lekkak	Algeria	FW	Rouen	Sedan*	4–4	11 November 1965	
Bernard Lech	France	MF	Lens*	Rennes	4–1	14 November 1965	
Philippe Gondet	France	FW	Nantes	Monaco*	3–1	5 December 1965	
Robert Herbin^{4}	France	MF	Saint-Étienne	Red Star*	5–1	5 December 1965	
Jean-Pierre Serra	France	FW/MF	Nice*	Sochaux	3–1	19 December 1965	
Georges Lech	France	FW	Lens	Rouen*	3–1	20 February 1966	
Hervé Revelli	France	FW	Saint-Étienne*	Angers	4–0	27 February 1966	
Roger Moy	France	DF/MF	Red Star*	Lille	6–4	23 April 1966	
Rafael Santos	Argentina	FW	Nice*	Angers	5–2	23 April 1966	
Philippe Gondet	France	FW	Nantes*	Rennes	4–0	23 April 1966	
André Guy	France	FW	Lille*	Valenciennes	6–1	30 April 1966	
Pierre Dorsini	France	FW	Toulouse*	Cannes	6–1	30 April 1966	
Didier Couécou^{4}	France	FW	Bordeaux*	Red Star	6–0	30 April 1966	
Daniel Rodighiéro	France	FW	Rennes*	Rouen	4–0	21 May 1966	
Robert Herbin	France	MF	Saint-Étienne*	Sedan	7–0	27 May 1966	
Philippe Gondet	France	FW	Nantes	Cannes*	6–1	11 June 1966	
José Farías	Argentina	MF	Strasbourg*	Monaco	4–2	18 August 1966	
Franck Fiawoo	Togo	FW	Marseille*	Nîmes	4–0	11 September 1966	
Hervé Revelli	France	FW	Saint-Étienne*	Rouen	3–0	14 September 1966	
Paul Courtin	France	FW	Lens	Sochaux*	5–2	25 September 1966	
Aimé Gori	France	MF	Reims*	Bordeaux	4–1	9 October 1966	
Francis Magny	France	FW	Nantes*	Reims	6–2	12 October 1966	
Claude Dubaële^{4}	France	MF/FW	Angers	Monaco*	5–1	12 October 1966	
Francis Magny	France	FW	Nantes*	Nîmes	5–3	28 October 1966	
Georges Lech	France	FW	Lens*	Reims	5–2	20 November 1966	
Georges Peyroche	France	MF	Lille*	Nîmes	4–0	4 December 1966	
Charly Loubet	France	FW	Nice*	Valenciennes	5–2	4 December 1966	
Héctor De Bourgoing	Argentina; France	MF	Bordeaux	Sedan*	3–0	11 December 1966	
Georges Lech	France	FW	Lens*	Nantes	4–0	8 January 1967	
Hervé Revelli	France	FW	Saint-Étienne*	Nice	7–0	22 January 1967	
Hervé Revelli	France	FW	Saint-Étienne*	Rennes	4–1	26 February 1967	
Michel Margottin	France	MF	Angers*	Rouen	5–2	2 March 1967	
Philippe Levavasseur	France	FW	Sedan*	Lille	4–1	25 March 1967	
Hervé Revelli^{4}	France	FW	Saint-Étienne*	Stade Français	7–1	28 April 1967	
Carlos Ruiter	Brazil	FW	Bordeaux*	Strasbourg	4–1	7 May 1967	
Louis Bourgeois	France	FW	Reims*	Lens	4–0	27 May 1967	
Daniel Rodighiéro	France	FW	Rennes*	Strasbourg	4–3	27 May 1967	
Robert Herbin	France	MF	Saint-Étienne	Angers*	3–0	11 June 1967	
Philippe Gondet	France	FW	Nantes	Lens*	3–1	30 August 1967	
Michel Margottin	France	MF	Angers*	Ajaccio	3–0	30 August 1967	
André Guy	France	FW	Lyon*	Angers	8–0	2 September 1967	
Jean-Louis Massé	France	FW	Bordeaux*	Nantes	6–2	23 September 1967	
Robert Gassert	France	FW	Aix*	Bordeaux	5–1	21 October 1967	
Philippe Levavasseur	France	FW	Sedan	Metz*	5–1	3 December 1967	
Étienne Sansonetti^{4}	France	FW	Ajaccio*	Aix	8–2	10 December 1967	
Jacques Rossignol	France	MF	Rennes*	Lille	4–1	21 January 1968	
Guy Lassalette	France	FW	Sochaux*	Ajaccio	3–1	28 January 1968	
Johny Léonard	Luxembourg	FW	Metz*	Rennes	6–1	25 February 1968	
Philippe Levavasseur	France	FW	Sedan*	Angers	3–1	23 March 1968	
Jacques Simon	France	MF	Nantes	Aix*	6–2	24 March 1968	
André Guy	France	FW	Lyon*	Lens	3–0	30 March 1968	
Étienne Sansonetti^{5}	France	FW	Ajaccio*	Rouen	5–3	4 May 1968	
Réginald Dortomb	France	FW	Rouen*	Aix	5–0	19 May 1968	
Roger Wicke	France	FW	Lens*	Marseille	5–1	16 June 1968	
André Guy^{4}	France	FW	Lyon*	Aix	4–3	21 June 1968	
Gérard Hausser^{4}	France	FW	Metz*	Rouen	7–3	8 September 1968	
Johny Léonard	Luxembourg	FW	Metz*	Rouen	7–3	8 September 1968	
Joseph Yegba Maya	Cameroon	FW	Marseille*	Sedan	4–1	28 September 1968	
André Guy^{4}	France	FW	Lyon*	Bastia	8–3	28 September 1968	
Mohamed Lekkak	Algeria	FW	Lyon*	Nantes	3–1	12 October 1968	
Carlos Ruiter	Brazil	FW	Bordeaux*	Bastia	8–1	20 October 1968	
Didier Couécou	France	FW	Bordeaux*	Bastia	8–1	20 October 1968	
André Guy	France	FW	Lyon*	Sochaux	6–3	26 October 1968	
André Coustillet	France	MF	Valenciennes*	Nice	3–0	1 November 1968	
Joseph Yegba Maya	Cameroon	FW	Marseille*	Nice	3–1	24 November 1968	
Hervé Revelli	France	FW	Saint-Étienne*	Metz	4–0	30 November 1968	
Olek Wolniak	Poland; France	MF/FW	Valenciennes*	Monaco	4–2	1 February 1969	
Jean-Claude Blanchard	France	FW	Bastia*	Lyon	4–0	23 February 1969	
Serge Lenoir	France	FW	Rennes*	Sochaux	3–2	23 February 1969	
Joseph Bonnel	France	MF	Marseille*	Ajaccio	3–0	16 March 1969	
Jacques Simon	France	MF	Bordeaux*	Red Star	6–1	12 April 1969	
Johny Léonard	Luxembourg	FW	Metz*	Sochaux	3–0	3 May 1969	
Hervé Revelli^{4}	France	FW	Saint-Étienne*	Bastia	7–2	9 May 1969	
Silvester Takač^{4}	Yugoslavia	FW	Rennes*	Nice	4–2	18 May 1969	
Étienne Sansonetti	France	FW	Ajaccio*	Red Star	3–1	23 May 1969	
Michel Margottin	France	MF	Angers*	Bastia	5–0	9 August 1969	
Fleury Di Nallo	France	FW	Lyon*	Sedan	4–2	9 August 1969	
Hervé Revelli^{4}	France	FW	Saint-Étienne*	Rennes	8–2	20 August 1969	
Philippe Levavasseur	France	FW	Nantes*	Rennes	6–1	3 September 1969	
Hervé Revelli	France	FW	Saint-Étienne	Red Star*	5–1	20 September 1969	
Félix Burdino	France	FW	Bordeaux*	Sochaux	3–0	27 September 1969	
Joseph Yegba Maya^{5}	Cameroon	FW	Marseille	Red Star*	6–1	8 November 1969	
Gérard Grizzetti	France	FW	Angoulême*	Sochaux	4–0	30 November 1969	
Adolf Scherer	Czechoslovakia	FW	Nîmes*	Lyon	5–2	14 December 1969	
Selimir Milosevic	Yugoslavia	FW	Red Star*	Nîmes	3–0	21 December 1969	

=== 1970s ===
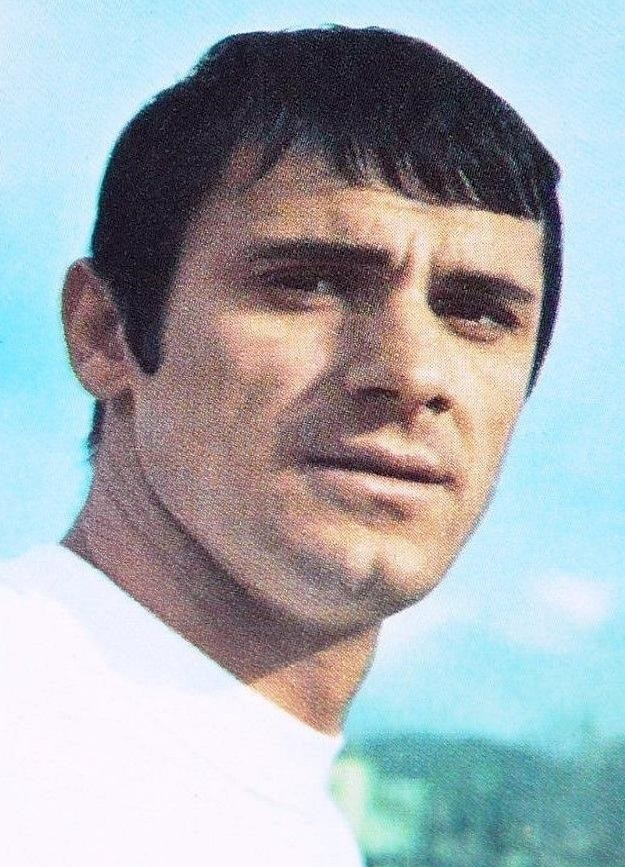
Josip Skoblar.

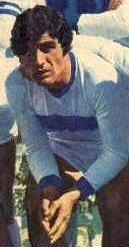
Delio Onnis.

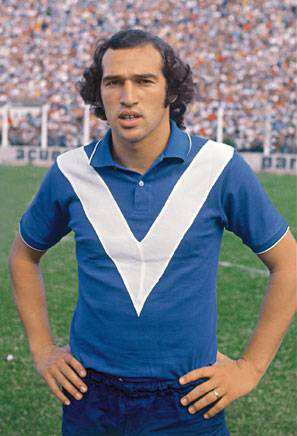
Carlos Bianchi.

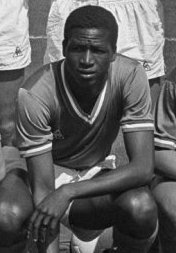
Salif Keïta.

Player	Nationality	Position	For	Against	Result	Date	Ref.
Adolf Scherer	Czechoslovakia	FW	Nîmes*	Bastia	4–1	1 February 1970	
Bernard Blanchet	France	FW	Nantes	Lyon*	5–2	8 March 1970	
Claude Dubaële^{4}	France	MF/FW	Angers*	Red Star	5–1	10 June 1970	
Nestor Rambert	Argentina	FW	Lyon	Rennes*	3–4	17 June 1970	
Étienne Sansonetti	France	FW	Ajaccio*	Nancy	5–0	12 August 1970	
Jacky Vergnes	France	FW	Nîmes*	Marseille	3–0	22 August 1970	
Robert Rico	France	FW	Rennes	Red Star*	5–1	20 September 1970	
Philippe Piat	France	FW	Sochaux*	Ajaccio	5–1	23 September 1970	
Florea Voinea	Romania	FW	Nîmes*	Sochaux	4–3	3 October 1970	
Réginald Dortomb^{4}	France	FW	Ajaccio*	Bastia	6–1	3 October 1970	
Vladica Kovačević	Yugoslavia	FW	Angers	Red Star*	5–0	11 October 1970	
Serge Dellamore	France	FW	Sedan*	Bastia	5–1	18 October 1970	
Ilija Lukić	Yugoslavia	FW	Rennes*	Nancy	5–1	24 October 1970	
Selimir Milosevic	Yugoslavia	FW	Red Star*	Ajaccio	3–0	24 October 1970	
Josip Skoblar	Yugoslavia	FW	Marseille	Lyon*	4–1	24 October 1970	
Salif Keïta^{4}	Mali	FW	Saint-Étienne*	Bastia	6–0	24 March 1971	
François M'Pelé^{4}	Republic of the Congo	FW	Ajaccio	Bastia*	4–1	3 April 1971	
Jacky Vergnes	France	FW	Nîmes*	Strasbourg	3–0	8 May 1971	
Finn Wiberg	Denmark	FW	Nancy*	Rennes	5–0	8 May 1971	
Joseph Yegba Maya	Cameroon	FW	Valenciennes*	Reims	3–1	15 May 1971	
Josip Skoblar	Yugoslavia	FW	Marseille*	Bastia	5–2	15 May 1971	
Félix Burdino	France	FW	Bordeaux*	Angers	3–0	18 May 1971	
Josip Skoblar^{4}	Yugoslavia	FW	Marseille*	Rennes	5–0	23 May 1971	
Salif Keïta^{6}	Mali	FW	Saint-Étienne*	Sedan	8–0	4 June 1971	
Salif Keïta^{4}	Mali	FW	Saint-Étienne*	Ajaccio	5–2	19 June 1971	
Philippe Piat	France	FW	Sochaux	Nice*	5–4	23 June 1971	
Josip Skoblar	Yugoslavia	FW	Marseille*	Strasbourg	6–3	26 June 1971	
Jacky Vergnes	France	FW	Nîmes*	Bastia	6–2	18 August 1971	
Néstor Combin	France	FW	Metz*	Lille	4–0	18 August 1971	
Salif Keïta^{4}	Mali	FW	Saint-Étienne*	Reims	9–1	25 August 1971	
Jean-Michel Larqué	France	MF	Saint-Étienne*	Reims	9–1	25 August 1971	
Josip Skoblar	Yugoslavia	FW	Marseille*	Red Star	6–0	11 September 1971	
Ángel Marcos	Argentina	FW	Nantes*	Metz	5–1	2 October 1971	
Philippe Piat	France	FW	Sochaux*	Rennes	3–2	16 October 1971	
Hervé Revelli	France	FW	Nice*	Lille	3–1	30 October 1971	
Patrice Vicq	France	MF/FW	Nancy*	Nice	3–2	14 November 1971	
Sokrat Mojsov	Yugoslavia	FW	Rennes*	Reims	4–1	21 November 1971	
Éric Edwige	France	FW	Angers*	Angoulême	8–1	21 November 1971	
Florea Voinea	Romania	FW	Nîmes	Red Star*	5–1	21 November 1971	
Antoine Kuszowski	France	FW	Nancy	Paris Saint-Germain*	4–1	16 January 1972	
Josip Skoblar	Yugoslavia	FW	Marseille	Red Star*	4–2	27 February 1972	
Bernard Lacombe	France	FW	Lyon*	Red Star	5–1	1 March 1972	
Réginald Dortomb	France	FW	Ajaccio*	Angers	3–0	1 March 1972	
Delio Onnis	Argentina	FW	Reims*	Paris Saint-Germain	3–3	1 April 1972	
Ion Pârcălab	Romania	FW	Nîmes*	Lille	5–2	23 April 1972	
Josip Skoblar	Yugoslavia	FW	Marseille	Angoulême*	3–2	23 April 1972	
Hervé Revelli	France	FW	Nice*	Bordeaux	5–1	3 May 1972	
Dick van Dijk	Netherlands	FW	Nice*	Ajaccio	5–3	21 August 1972	
Éric Edwige	France	FW	Angers	Nice*	4–2	20 September 1972	
Néstor Combin	France	FW	Metz*	Sedan	4–2	30 September 1972	
Dick van Dijk	Netherlands	FW	Nice	Sedan*	5–0	28 October 1972	
Mordechai Spiegler	Israel	FW	Paris FC*	Lyon	5–1	17 December 1972	
Hervé Revelli	France	FW	Nice	Ajaccio*	3–0	17 January 1973	
Pierino Lattuada	Uruguay	FW	Bordeaux*	Ajaccio	3–0	4 February 1973	
Serge Dellamore	France	FW	Sedan*	Ajaccio	5–0	25 February 1973	
Édouard Wojciak	France	FW	Bordeaux	Paris FC*	3–4	25 February 1973	
Néstor Combin	France	FW	Metz	Paris FC*	3–1	9 March 1973	
Henri Michel	France	MF	Nantes*	Ajaccio	6–1	17 March 1973	
François M'Pelé	Republic of the Congo	FW	Ajaccio*	Lyon	4–3	17 March 1973	
Serge Lenoir	France	FW	Bastia*	Metz	4–0	31 March 1973	
Bernard Lacombe	France	FW	Lyon*	Strasbourg	4–0	11 April 1973	
Gilles Rampillon	France	MF	Nantes*	Lyon	3–0	1 May 1973	
Néstor Combin^{5}	France	FW	Metz*	Ajaccio	7–0	29 May 1973	
Yvan Roy	France	FW	Strasbourg*	Sochaux	4–2	29 May 1973	
Patrick Revelli^{4}	France	FW	Saint-Étienne*	Bordeaux	6–2	2 June 1973	
Josip Skoblar^{4}	Yugoslavia	FW	Marseille*	Strasbourg	6–1	14 August 1973	
Hervé Revelli	France	FW	Saint-Étienne*	Paris FC	4–0	17 August 1973	
Marc Berdoll^{4}	France	FW	Angers*	Saint-Étienne	4–0	24 August 1973	
Serge Chiesa	France	FW	Lyon*	Angers	3–1	1 September 1973	
Robert Rico	France	FW	Bordeaux*	Paris FC	6–1	1 September 1973	
Ange Di Caro	France	FW	Nancy	Monaco*	3–3	12 September 1973	
Claude Papi	France	FW	Bastia*	Lyon	5–1	25 September 1973	
Romain Argyroudis	France	FW	Lens*	Bastia	3–1	6 October 1973	
Juan Carlos Trebucq	Argentina	FW	Troyes*	Paris FC	4–1	6 October 1973	
Nico Braun	Luxembourg	FW	Metz*	Bastia	3–0	30 October 1973	
Hervé Revelli	France	FW	Saint-Étienne*	Nancy	6–0	10 November 1973	
Éric Edwige^{4}	France	FW	Angers*	Troyes	6–1	9 December 1973	
Nico Braun	Luxembourg	FW	Metz*	Paris FC	4–0	16 December 1973	
Nico Braun^{4}	Luxembourg	FW	Metz*	Saint-Étienne	5–1	22 December 1973	
Carlos Bianchi	Argentina	FW	Reims*	Angers	4–2	13 January 1974	
Gérard Soler	France	FW	Sochaux*	Nancy	4–1	10 February 1974	
Jacky Vergnes^{4}	France	FW	Bastia*	Monaco	4–0	16 April 1974	
Hugo Curioni	Argentina	FW	Nantes*	Lens	4–0	19 April 1974	
Carlos Bianchi^{5}	Argentina	FW	Reims*	Monaco	8–4	25 May 1974	
Delio Onnis^{4}	Argentina	FW	Monaco	Reims*	4–8	25 May 1974	
Mustapha Dahleb	Algeria	MF	Sedan*	Troyes	4–3	25 May 1974	
Carlos Bianchi^{6}	Argentina	FW	Reims*	Paris Saint-Germain	6–1	9 August 1974	
François M'Pelé	Republic of the Congo	FW	Paris Saint-Germain*	Angers	3–2	23 August 1974	
Serge Lenoir	France	FW	Bastia	Lens*	3–3	5 October 1974	
Jacky Vergnes	France	FW	Bastia*	Troyes	5–1	18 October 1974	
Néstor Combin	France	FW	Red Star*	Nice	4–1	26 October 1974	
Guy Nosibor	France	FW	Paris Saint-Germain	Troyes*	3–1	26 October 1974	
Jacky Vergnes	France	FW	Bastia*	Nîmes	4–0	29 October 1974	
Marc Berdoll^{4}	France	FW	Angers	Lille*	5–1	1 November 1974	
Laurent Pokou	Ivory Coast	FW	Rennes*	Strasbourg	5–1	9 November 1974	
Delio Onnis	Argentina	FW	Monaco	Lens*	3–6	9 November 1974	
Stanislav Karasi	Yugoslavia	FW	Lille*	Metz	4–0	20 November 1974	
Jean Gallice	France	FW	Bordeaux*	Strasbourg	4–1	8 December 1974	
Bernard Lacombe^{4}	France	FW	Lyon*	Bastia	8–1	26 January 1975	
Santiago Santamaria	Argentina	FW	Reims*	Troyes	3–0	16 February 1975	
Boško Antić	Yugoslavia	FW	Angers*	Strasbourg	5–1	20 March 1975	
Francis Piasecki	France	MF	Sochaux*	Lyon	3–1	3 May 1975	
Michel Maillard	France	FW	Lyon	Nancy*	4–1	22 August 1975	
Serge Chiesa	France	FW	Lyon	Nantes*	3–2	27 August 1975	
Delio Onnis	Argentina	FW	Monaco*	Nîmes	3–1	27 August 1975	
Delio Onnis	Argentina	FW	Monaco*	Valenciennes	3–1	12 September 1975	
Hugo Curioni^{4}	Argentina	FW	Metz*	Nîmes	4–3	26 September 1975	
Pierre Pleimelding	France	FW	Monaco*	Nantes	4–4	26 September 1975	
Joachim Marx	Poland	FW	Lens*	Lyon	3–1	31 October 1975	
Carlos Bianchi	Argentina	FW	Reims*	Strasbourg	6–0	31 October 1975	
Mustapha Dahleb	Algeria	MF	Paris Saint-Germain	Nancy*	4–2	8 November 1975	
Carlos Bianchi^{4}	Argentina	FW	Reims	Metz*	4–2	7 December 1975	
Robert Pintenat	France	FW	Sochaux*	Lille	4–1	13 December 1975	
Delio Onnis^{4}	Argentina	FW	Monaco*	Nice	4–1	17 January 1976	
Michel Platini	France	MF/FW	Nancy*	Marseille	4–2	15 February 1976	
Claude Papi	France	FW	Bastia*	Lyon	4–1	7 April 1976	
Stanislav Karasi	Yugoslavia	FW	Lille*	Valenciennes	5–1	9 May 1976	
Bruno Baronchelli	France	FW	Nantes	Sochaux*	6–2	7 September 1976	
Bernard Lacombe	France	FW	Lyon*	Lens	3–3	7 September 1976	
Michel Platini^{4}	France	MF/FW	Nancy*	Bordeaux	7–3	18 September 1976	
Slobodan Janković	Yugoslavia	MF	Lens*	Paris Saint-Germain	3–3	24 September 1976	
Francisco Rubio	France	MF	Nancy*	Metz	4–1	2 October 1976	
Jacky Vergnes	France	FW	Laval*	Saint-Étienne	3–1	4 December 1976	
André Barthelemy^{4}	France	FW	Angers*	Nice	5–0	22 January 1977	
Carlos Bianchi	Argentina	FW	Reims*	Nancy	3–3	30 January 1977	
Luizinho Da Silva	Brazil	FW	Nîmes*	Bordeaux	3–2	24 February 1977	
François M'Pelé	Republic of the Congo	FW	Paris Saint-Germain	Valenciennes*	3–0	27 May 1977	
Nico Braun	Luxembourg	FW	Metz*	Laval	5–3	4 June 1977	
Santiago Santamaria	Argentina	FW	Reims*	Lille	3–1	8 June 1977	
Ignacio Peña	Argentina	FW	Rouen*	Metz	5–2	3 August 1977	
Christian Dalger	France	FW	Monaco	Bordeaux*	4–0	16 August 1977	
Nenad Bjeković	Yugoslavia	FW	Nice	Bordeaux*	5–3	2 September 1977	
Zvonko Ivezić	Yugoslavia	FW	Sochaux*	Troyes	5–2	17 September 1977	
Gérard Soler^{4}	France	FW	Sochaux*	Lens	7–2	11 October 1977	
Carlos Bianchi^{4}	Argentina	FW	Paris Saint-Germain*	Troyes	8–2	14 October 1977	
Bernard Lacombe	France	FW	Lyon*	Marseille	4–2	22 October 1977	
Johnny Rep	Netherlands	MF	Bastia	Lens*	4–3	2 November 1977	
Michel Platini^{4}	France	MF/FW	Nancy	Nice*	7–3	2 November 1977	
Mustapha Dahleb	Algeria	MF	Paris Saint-Germain*	Saint-Étienne	4–1	9 November 1977	
Nenad Bjeković	Yugoslavia	FW	Nice*	Bastia	3–1	19 November 1977	
Ignacio Peña	Argentina	FW	Rouen*	Lyon	3–2	19 November 1977	
Bernard Lacombe	France	FW	Lyon*	Laval	5–0	17 December 1977	
Carlos Bianchi	Argentina	FW	Paris Saint-Germain*	Rouen	3–1	22 January 1978	
Didier Six	France	FW	Lens	Nice*	4–5	3 February 1978	
Delio Onnis	Argentina	FW	Monaco*	Rouen	6–1	26 February 1978	
Carlos Bianchi	Argentina	FW	Paris Saint-Germain*	Nîmes	5–0	11 March 1978	
Olivier Rouyer	France	FW	Nancy	Troyes*	3–2	25 March 1978	
Carlos Bianchi	Argentina	FW	Paris Saint-Germain*	Sochaux	3–1	5 April 1978	
Sarr Boubacar	Senegal	FW	Marseille*	Metz	4–0	21 April 1978	
Santiago Santamaria	Argentina	FW	Reims*	Troyes	5–1	21 April 1978	
Nenad Bjeković^{4}	Yugoslavia	FW	Nice*	Rouen	6–1	25 April 1978	
Delio Onnis^{4}	Argentina	FW	Monaco*	Metz	4–0	28 April 1978	
Albert Gemmrich	France	FW	Strasbourg	Laval*	3–2	2 May 1978	
Victor Trossero	Argentina	FW	Nantes*	Angers	5–0	25 August 1978	
Gilbert Marguerite	France	FW	Nîmes*	Bordeaux	4–2	22 September 1978	
Nenad Bjeković	Yugoslavia	FW	Nice*	Metz	5–0	14 October 1978	
Éric Pécout	France	FW	Nantes	Reims*	4–1	3 December 1978	
Jacky Vergnes^{4}	France	FW	Bordeaux	Paris Saint-Germain*	5–2	10 December 1978	
Delio Onnis	Argentina	FW	Monaco*	Metz	4–1	27 December 1978	
Delio Onnis	Argentina	FW	Monaco	Paris FC*	7–1	3 February 1979	
Éric Pécout	France	FW	Nantes	Metz*	3–1	28 March 1979	
Patrick Formica	France	FW	Metz*	Paris FC	5–1	7 April 1979	
Bernard Castellani	France	FW	Nice*	Paris FC	5–0	5 May 1979	
Carlos Bianchi	Argentina	FW	Paris Saint-Germain*	Monaco	3–0	25 May 1979	
Éric Benoit	France	MF	Sochaux*	Metz	4–0	25 May 1979	
Gérard Soler	France	FW	Bordeaux*	Valenciennes	7–0	10 August 1979	
Albert Gemmrich	France	FW	Bordeaux*	Valenciennes	7–0	10 August 1979	
Patrick Revelli	France	FW	Sochaux	Angers*	3–1	28 September 1979	
Michel N'Gom	France	FW	Marseille	Nice*	3–0	28 September 1979	
Erwin Kostedde	Germany	FW	Laval*	Nîmes	3–1	6 October 1979	
Yannick Stopyra	France	FW	Sochaux	Bordeaux*	3–2	13 October 1979	
Pierre Pleimelding	France	FW	Lille	Lens*	3–5	2 December 1979	

=== 1980s ===
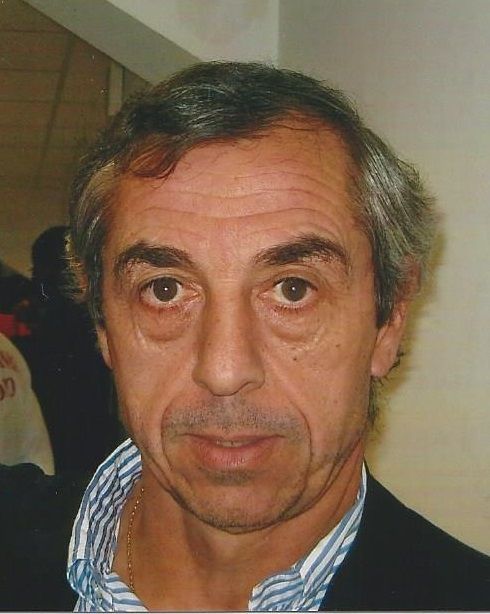
Alain Giresse.

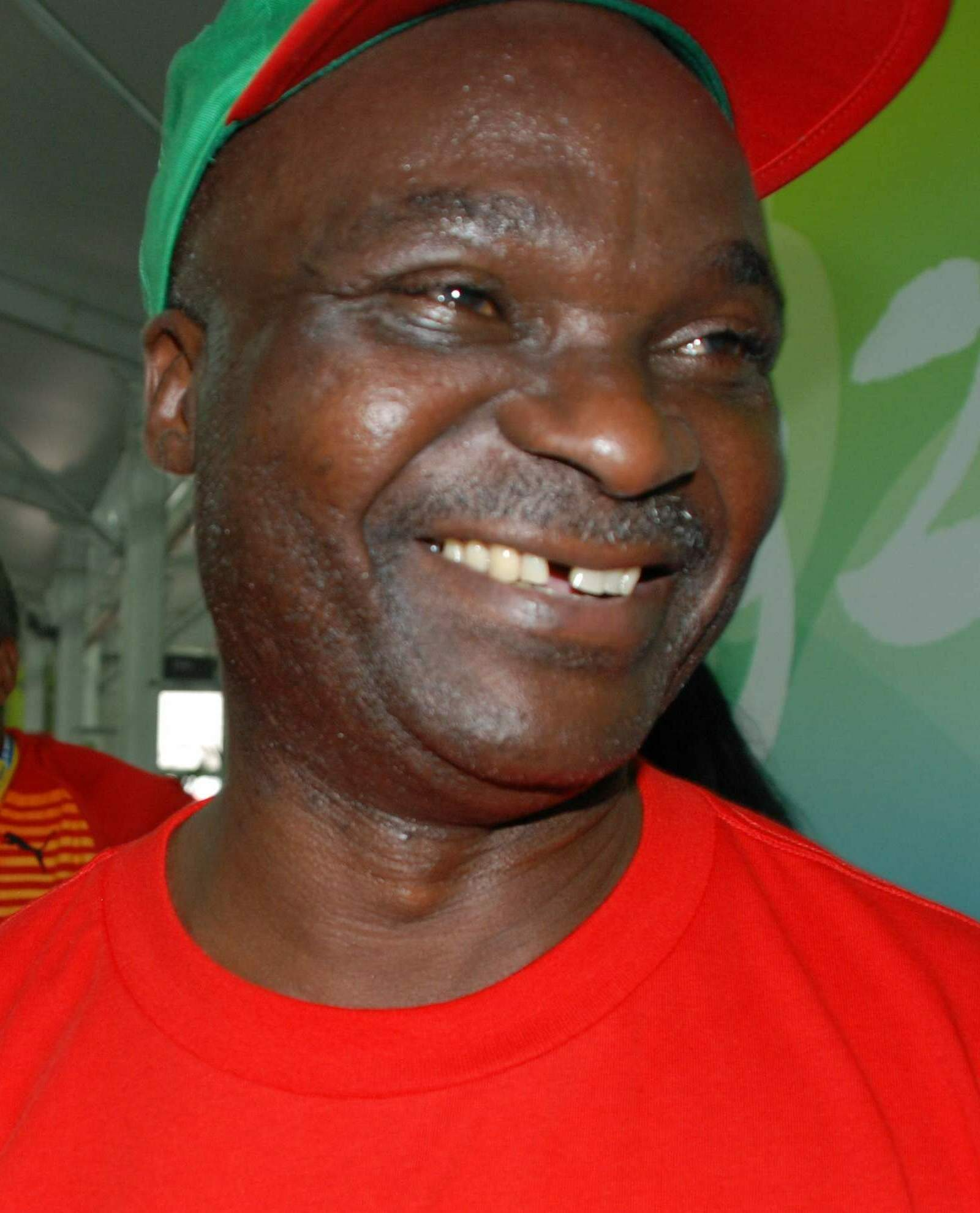
Roger Milla.

Player	Nationality	Position	For	Against	Result	Date	Ref.
Éric Pécout	France	FW	Nantes*	Bordeaux	4–1	2 February 1980	
Nambatingue Toko	Chad	FW	Valenciennes	Marseille*	6–3	23 February 1980	
François Brisson	France	FW	Laval*	Nice	3–0	29 March 1980	
Erwin Kostedde	Germany	FW	Laval*	Marseille	3–0	6 May 1980	
Delio Onnis	Argentina	FW	Monaco*	Lyon	4–0	6 May 1980	
Laurent Roussey	France	FW	Saint-Étienne*	Angers	5–0	22 August 1980	
Michel Decastel	Switzerland	MF	Strasbourg*	Tours	4–1	4 October 1980	
Karim Maroc	Algeria	FW	Lyon*	Angers	5–1	11 October 1980	
Uwe Krause	Germany	FW	Laval*	Lens	3–0	8 November 1980	
Dominique Rocheteau	France	FW	Paris Saint-Germain*	Lille	4–1	5 December 1980	
Simo Nikolić	Yugoslavia	FW	Lyon*	Sochaux	5–1	8 February 1980	
Andrzej Szarmach	Poland	FW	Auxerre*	Metz	4–2	8 February 1980	
Simo Nikolić	Yugoslavia	FW	Lyon*	Nancy	4–2	28 March 1981	
Simo Nikolić	Yugoslavia	FW	Lyon	Angers*	3–1	15 April 1981	
Bernard Lacombe	France	FW	Bordeaux*	Valenciennes	4–0	12 May 1981	
Bernard Zénier	France	FW	Nancy*	Valenciennes	7–1	29 May 1981	
Pascal Zaremba	France	MF	Valenciennes*	Lille	4–0	7 August 1981	
Éric Pécout^{4}	France	FW	Monaco*	Auxerre	7–1	11 August 1981	
Jean-François Larios	France	MF	Saint-Étienne	Lens*	5–2	21 August 1981	
Simo Nikolić	Yugoslavia	FW	Lyon*	Bastia	4–1	1 September 1981	
Ralf Edström	Sweden	FW	Monaco*	Lille	4–0	27 October 1981	
Jean-Michel Ferrière	France	FW	Nancy*	Nice	4–0	21 November 1981	
Michel Platini^{4}	France	MF	Saint-Étienne*	Valenciennes	5–1	22 November 1981	
Delio Onnis	Argentina	FW	Tours*	Brest	5–0	29 November 1981	
Bruno Bellone	France	FW	Monaco	Sochaux*	4–1	12 December 1981	
Bernard Lacombe	France	FW	Bordeaux*	Bastia	4–0	20 February 1982	
Jean-Marc Valadier	France	FW	Monaco*	Valenciennes	3–1	28 February 1982	
Andrzej Szarmach	Poland	FW	Auxerre*	Valenciennes	3–0	9 April 1982	
Milan Radović	Yugoslavia	FW	Brest*	Bordeaux	3–1	23 April 1982	
Roger Milla	Cameroon	FW	Bastia*	Nancy	3–2	3 September 1982	
Kees Kist	Netherlands	FW	Paris Saint-Germain*	Mulhouse	5–1	21 September 1982	
Dieter Müller^{4}	Germany	FW	Bordeaux*	Lyon	5–1	12 October 1982	
Jean-François Beltramini	France	FW	Rouen*	Tours	4–2	12 October 1982	
Jean-Philippe Dehon	France	MF	Tours*	Lens	5–1	29 October 1982	
Albert Emon	France	FW	Lyon*	Metz	3–3	20 November 1982	
Tony Kurbos	Yugoslavia	FW	Metz	Lyon*	3–3	20 November 1982	
Jean-François Beltramini	France	FW	Rouen*	Mulhouse	4–2	15 December 1982	
Abdelkrim Merry	Morocco	FW	Metz*	Tours	5–1	18 December 1982	
Abdelkrim Merry	Morocco	FW	Metz*	Rouen	3–2	22 January 1983	
Simo Nikolić	Yugoslavia	FW	Lyon*	Mulhouse	7–3	22 January 1983	
Bernard Ferrigno	France	FW	Tours*	Laval	4–1	29 January 1983	
Yves Ibanez	France	FW	Mulhouse*	Bordeaux	4–4	29 January 1983	
Andrzej Szarmach	Poland	FW	Auxerre*	Saint-Étienne	4–1	19 March 1983	
Alain Giresse	France	MF	Bordeaux*	Sochaux	3–1	29 April 1983	
Philippe Anziani	France	FW	Sochaux*	Brest	4–0	20 May 1983	
Alain Giresse	France	MF	Bordeaux*	Nîmes	4–0	3 August 1983	
Patrice Garande	France	FW	Auxerre*	Laval	3–0	10 August 1983	
Andrzej Szarmach	Poland	FW	Auxerre*	Brest	5–0	20 August 1983	
Jean-François Beltramini^{4}	France	FW	Rouen*	Nancy	7–1	31 August 1983	
Alain Giresse	France	MF	Bordeaux	Toulouse*	3–1	17 September 1983	
Dušan Savić	Yugoslavia	FW	Lille*	Toulon	4–2	21 September 1983	
Andrzej Szarmach^{4}	Poland	FW	Auxerre*	Nancy	4–0	5 November 1983	
Philippe Vercruysse	France	MF	Lens*	Toulon	5–1	16 November 1983	
Dieter Müller	Germany	FW	Bordeaux	Bastia*	3–1	19 November 1983	
Dieter Müller	Germany	FW	Bordeaux*	Saint-Étienne	7–0	31 March 1984	
Philippe Anziani^{5}	France	FW	Sochaux*	Toulon	8–2	14 April 1984	
Tony Kurbos^{6}	Yugoslavia	FW	Metz	Nîmes*	7–3	28 April 1984	
Stéphane Paille	France	FW	Sochaux*	RC Paris	6–1	24 August 1984	
Fabrice Picot	France	FW	Nancy*	RC Paris	4–0	28 September 1984	
Bernard Lacombe	France	FW	Bordeaux*	Metz	6–0	16 October 1984	
Chérif Oudjani	Algeria	FW	Lens*	Tours	6–1	2 November 1984	
Dieter Müller	Germany	FW	Bordeaux*	Laval	5–2	24 November 1984	
Bernard Genghini	France	MF	Monaco*	Bordeaux	3–0	1 December 1984	
Bernard Lacombe	France	FW	Bordeaux*	Nancy	3–1	14 December 1984	
Delio Onnis	Argentina	FW	Toulon*	Paris Saint-Germain	5–1	21 December 1984	
Jules Bocandé	Senegal	FW	Metz	Laval*	4–1	21 December 1984	
Dieter Müller	Germany	FW	Bordeaux*	Bastia	4–0	1 March 1985	
Jean-Louis Zanon	France	MF	Marseille*	Bastia	5–0	15 March 1985	
Bruno Bellone	France	MF	Monaco*	Lille	6–1	12 April 1985	
Uwe Reinders	Germany	FW	Bordeaux*	Monaco	5–1	30 August 1985	
Chérif Oudjani	Algeria	FW	Laval*	Toulouse	3–2	11 October 1985	
Vahid Halilhodžić	Yugoslavia	FW	Nantes*	Lens	4–0	18 October 1985	
Abdelkrim Merry^{4}	Morocco	FW	Le Havre*	Toulon	4–3	25 October 1985	
Jules Bocandé	Senegal	FW	Metz*	Rennes	4–1	20 November 1985	
Dominique Rocheteau	France	FW	Paris Saint-Germain*	Laval	5–1	7 December 1985	
Bernard Genghini^{4}	France	MF	Monaco*	Bordeaux	9–0	18 January 1986	
Patrick Cubaynes	France	FW	Strasbourg*	Bastia	6–1	18 January 1986	
Marc Pascal	France	FW	Bordeaux*	Le Havre	5–3	18 April 1986	
Guy Lacombe	France	FW	Lille*	Sochaux	6–0	14 December 1986	
Alberto Márcico	Argentina	MF	Toulouse*	Rennes	4–2	17 April 1987	
Marc Pascal^{4}	France	FW	Brest*	Lens	4–1	22 August 1987	
Philippe Fargeon	France	FW	Bordeaux*	Cannes	3–3	19 September 1987	
François Omam-Biyik	Cameroon	FW	Laval*	Le Havre	4–3	31 October 1987	
Christian Perez	France	FW	Montpellier*	Brest	6–0	26 March 1988	
Roger Milla	Cameroon	FW	Montpellier*	Saint-Étienne	5–0	9 April 1988	
Roger Milla	Cameroon	FW	Montpellier*	Laval	6–2	3 September 1988	
Daniel Bravo	France	MF	Nice*	Lens	3–0	17 September 1988	
Zlatko Vujović	Yugoslavia	FW	Cannes*	Strasbourg	4–1	22 February 1989	
Philippe Hinschberger	France	MF	Metz	RC Paris*	4–1	11 March 1988	
Philippe Tibeuf	France	FW	Saint-Étienne	Caen*	3–2	18 March 1989	
Fabrice Divert	France	FW	Cannes	Bordeaux*	3–2	20 May 1989	
Dragan Jakovljević	Yugoslavia	FW	Nantes*	RC Paris	5–1	5 August 1989	
Guy Mengual	France	FW	Caen*	Lille	3–0	5 August 1989	
Jean-Pierre Papin^{4}	France	FW	Marseille*	Sochaux	6–1	29 August 1989	
Robby Langers	Luxembourg	FW	Nice*	Montpellier	3–0	16 September 1989	
Jean-Pierre Papin	France	FW	Marseille*	Toulouse	6–1	3 December 1989	

=== 1990s ===
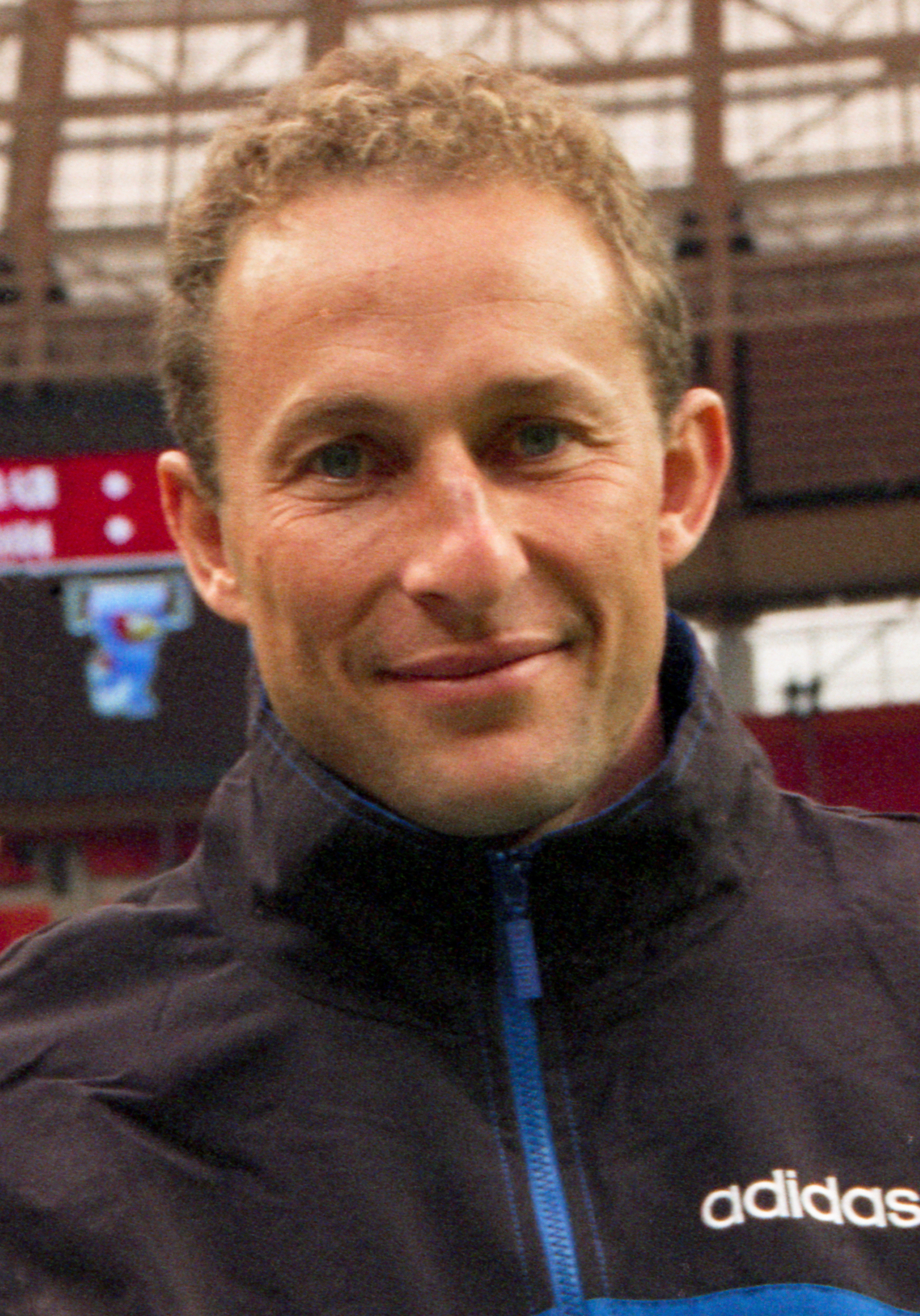
Jean-Pierre Papin.

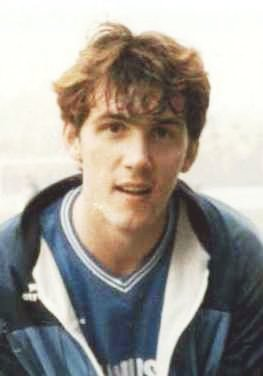
Tony Cascarino.

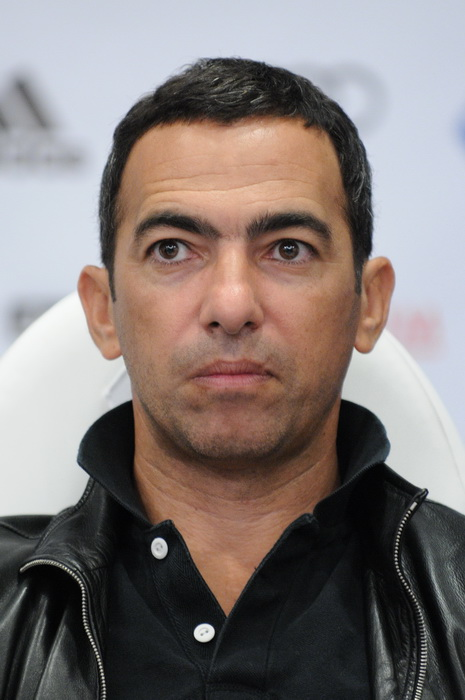
Youri Djorkaeff.

Player	Nationality	Position	For	Against	Result	Date	Ref.
Jean-Pierre Papin	France	FW	Marseille*	Toulon	3–0	15 March 1990	
Kálmán Kovács	Hungary	FW	Auxerre	Monaco*	4–2	24 March 1990	
Jean-Pierre Papin	France	FW	Marseille*	Lille	4–1	31 March 1990	
Miloš Bursać	Yugoslavia	FW	Toulon*	Montpellier	3–0	7 April 1990	
Etienne Mendy	France	FW	Saint-Étienne*	Brest	6–1	2 December 1990	
Roberto Cabañas	Paraguay	FW	Lyon*	Toulouse	4–1	13 January 1991	
Jean-Pierre Papin^{4}	France	FW	Marseille*	Lyon	7–0	13 January 1991	
Bernard Ferrer	France	MF	Brest*	Lyon	3–0	10 February 1991	
Enzo Scifo	Belgium	MF	Auxerre*	Sochaux	4–1	10 February 1991	
Anthony Bancarel	France	FW	Saint-Étienne	Toulouse*	4–1	6 April 1991	
Jean-Pierre Papin	France	FW	Marseille*	Nancy	6–2	6 April 1991	
Stéphane Paille	France	FW	Caen*	Nancy	5–1	14 September 1991	
Jean-Pierre Papin	France	FW	Marseille*	Rennes	5–1	14 December 1991	
Leonardo Rodríguez^{4}	Argentina	FW	Toulon*	Nancy	4–2	18 January 1992	
Gérald Baticle	France	FW	Auxerre*	Monaco	4–1	15 August 1992	
Japhet N'Doram	Chad	FW	Nantes*	Lens	3–2	19 September 1992	
Christophe Robert	France	FW	Valenciennes*	Le Havre	4–1	17 October 1992	
Xavier Gravelaine	France	FW	Caen	Lens*	3–0	24 October 1992	
Jürgen Klinsmann^{4}	Germany	FW	Monaco*	Auxerre	4–0	9 January 1993	
Rudi Völler	Germany	FW	Marseille*	Toulon	5–2	9 January 1993	
Fabrice Divert	France	FW	Montpellier	Valenciennes*	3–1	30 January 1993	
Lionel Prat	France	FW	Sochaux*	Le Havre	3–2	6 February 1993	
Anthony Bancarel	France	FW	Toulouse*	Nîmes	3–0	12 March 1993	
Alen Bokšić	Croatia	FW	Marseille*	Strasbourg	5–0	1 May 1993	
Lilian Laslandes	France	FW	Auxerre*	Nîmes	5–2	22 May 1993	
Nicolas Ouédec	France	FW	Nantes*	Toulouse	4–1	29 May 1993	
Gérald Baticle	France	FW	Auxerre*	Lyon	3–2	23 August 1993	
Frank Leboeuf	France	DF	Strasbourg*	Caen	3–0	22 October 1993	
Youri Djorkaeff^{4}	France	FW	Monaco*	Martigues	7–0	23 October 1993	
Roger Boli	France	FW	Lens*	Le Havre	5–1	2 April 1994	
Jean-Philippe Séchet	France	FW	Lille	Metz*	4–0	26 April 1994	
Laurent Blanc	France	DF	Saint-Étienne*	Le Havre	4–1	27 August 1994	
Valdeir	Brazil	FW	Bordeaux	Sochaux*	4–1	17 September 1994	
Didier Tholot^{4}	France	FW	Martigues*	Bastia	5–2	23 September 1994	
Kenneth Andersson	Sweden	FW	Caen*	Rennes	5–1	28 October 1994	
Kenneth Andersson	Sweden	FW	Caen*	Bordeaux	4–2	9 November 1994	
Lionel Prat	France	FW	Sochaux*	Metz	4–2	19 November 1994	
Patrice Loko	France	FW	Nantes*	Lille	3–0	7 January 1995	
Nicolas Ouédec	France	FW	Nantes*	Montpellier	3–2	1 February 1995	
Florian Maurice	France	FW	Lyon*	Lille	3–1	11 February 1995	
Sonny Anderson^{4}	Brazil	FW	Monaco*	Bordeaux	6–3	22 March 1995	
Youri Djorkaeff	France	FW	Monaco*	Lens	6–0	29 April 1995	
Japhet N'Doram	Chad	FW	Martigues	Nantes*	4–0	26 July 1995	
Fabien Lefévre	France	FW	Montpellier*	Bastia	4–3	14 October 1995	
Marco Grassi	Switzerland	FW	Rennes*	Guingamp	3–0	7 November 1995	
Corentin Martins	France	MF	Auxerre*	Martigues	3–0	2 March 1996	
Laurent Charvet	France	DF	Cannes*	Lens	5–2	11 May 1996	
Youri Djorkaeff	France	FW	Paris Saint-Germain*	Bastia	5–1	18 May 1996	
Robert Pires	France	FW	Metz*	Strasbourg	3–1	28 August 1996	
Jean-Philippe Durand	France	MF	Marseille*	Rennes	3–1	3 September 1996	
David Zitelli	France	FW	Strasbourg*	Lille	3–0	28 September 1996	
Tony Cascarino	Ireland	FW	Nancy	Le Havre*	3–1	20 December 1996	
Stéphane Guivarc'h	France	FW	Rennes*	Marseille	4–2	20 December 1996	
Ibrahima Bakayoko	Ivory Coast	FW	Montpellier	Lille*	4–0	25 March 1997	
Pascal Nouma^{4}	France	FW	Strasbourg	Montpellier*	4–1	26 April 1997	
Patrice Loko^{4}	France	FW	Paris Saint-Germain*	Nice	5–0	27 April 1997	
Ludovic Giuly	France	MF	Lyon*	Marseille	8–0	24 May 1997	
Anto Drobnjak	Yugoslavia	FW	Lens	Marseille*	3–2	22 August 1997	
Anto Drobnjak	Yugoslavia	FW	Lens*	Cannes	5–4	15 November 1997	
Marco Grassi	Switzerland	FW	Cannes	Lens*	4–5	15 November 1997	
Stéphane Guivarc'h	France	FW	Auxerre*	Toulouse	3–1	21 January 1998	
David Trezeguet	France	FW	Monaco*	Montpellier	4–0	24 January 1998	
Lionel Prat	France	FW	Le Havre*	Châteauroux	5–0	5 February 1998	
Sylvain Wiltord	France	FW	Bordeaux*	Guingamp	4–2	7 March 1998	
Tony Vairelles	France	FW	Lens*	Bastia	5–1	25 April 1998	
Nenad Jestrović	Yugoslavia	FW	Metz*	Bastia	4–0	15 December 1998	
Lilian Laslandes	France	FW	Bordeaux*	Metz	6–0	19 December 1998	
Laurent Robert	France	MF	Montpellier	Toulouse*	5–2	19 December 1998	
David Trezeguet	France	FW	Monaco*	Bastia	4–0	14 August 1999	
Tony Cascarino	Ireland	FW	Nancy*	Rennes	3–0	2 October 1999	
Christian	Brazil	FW	Paris Saint-Germain	Metz*	3–1	12 December 1999	
Alex Dias^{4}	Brazil	FW	Saint-Étienne*	Marseille	5–1	12 December 1999	

=== 2000s ===
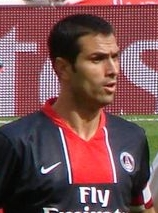
Pauleta.

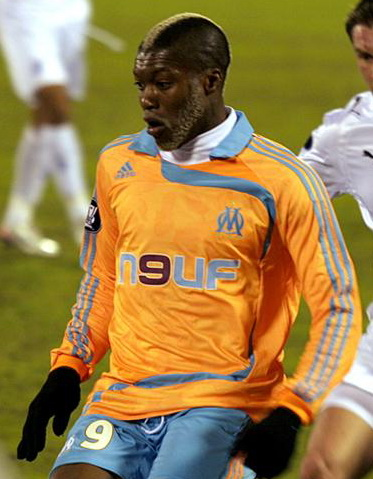
Djibril Cissé.

Player	Nationality	Position	For	Against	Result	Date	Ref.
Christian^{4}	Brazil	FW	Paris Saint-Germain*	Strasbourg	4–2	26 January 2000	
Peguy Luyindula	France	FW	Strasbourg*	Lyon	4–2	2 February 2000	
Laurent Leroy^{4}	France	FW	Paris Saint-Germain*	Lens	4–1	14 April 2000	
Pauleta	Portugal	FW	Bordeaux	Nantes*	5–0	6 September 2000	
Alex Dias	Brazil	FW	Saint-Étienne*	Troyes	4–1	4 November 2000	
Pius Ndiefi	Cameroon	FW	Sedan*	Paris Saint-Germain	5–1	2 December 2000	
Djibril Cissé^{4}	France	FW	Auxerre	Rennes*	5–0	28 July 2001	
Olivier Monterrubio	France	FW	Rennes*	Monaco	3–0	11 August 2001	
Daniel Moreira	France	FW	Lens	Lorient*	3–2	13 October 2001	
Jean-Claude Darcheville	French Guiana	FW	Lorient*	Guingamp	6–2	27 October 2001	
Christophe Delmotte	Belgium	FW	Lyon	Guingamp*	4–2	5 January 2002	
Kaba Diawara	Guinea	FW	Nice*	Strasbourg	4–0	10 August 2002	
Sonny Anderson	Brazil	FW	Lyon*	Bastia	4–1	24 August 2002	
Juninho Pernambucano	Brazil	MF	Lyon*	Auxerre	3–0	19 October 2002	
Frédéric Piquionne	France	FW	Rennes*	Lille	5–1	30 November 2002	
Pauleta	Portugal	FW	Bordeaux	Ajaccio*	6–1	19 April 2003	
Henri Camara	Senegal	FW	Sedan*	Troyes	4–0	19 April 2003	
Shabani Nonda	Democratic Republic of the Congo	FW	Monaco*	Troyes	6–0	24 May 2003	
Juninho Pernambucano	Brazil	MF	Lyon*	Lens	4–0	27 September 2003	
Peguy Luyindula	France	FW	Lyon	Ajaccio*	4–2	4 October 2003	
Djibril Cissé	France	FW	Auxerre*	Lille	3–0	4 October 2003	
Moumouni Dagano	Burkina Faso	FW	Guingamp*	Strasbourg	3–2	10 January 2004	
Pierre-Alain Frau	France	FW	Montpellier	Sochaux*	3–1	21 January 2004	
Emmanuel Adebayor	Togo	FW	Monaco*	Montpellier	4–0	20 February 2004	
Matthieu Chalmé	France	DF	Lille	Ajaccio*	3–0	13 March 2004	
Jérôme Leroy	France	MF	Guingamp*	Montpellier	4–3	13 March 2004	
Alexander Frei^{4}	Switzerland	FW	Rennes*	Marseille	4–3	21 March 2004	
Viorel Moldovan	Romania	FW	Nantes*	Montpellier	3–2	27 March 2004	
Toifilou Maoulida	France	FW	Metz*	Le Mans	5–0	3 April 2004	
Bernard Diomède	France	MF	Ajaccio*	Metz	3–1	23 May 2004	
Marouane Chamakh	Morocco	FW	Bordeaux*	Nice	5–1	14 August 2004	
Victor Agali	Nigeria	FW	Nice	Monaco*	4–3	2 October 2004	
Ilan	Brazil	FW	Sochaux*	Rennes	3–0	16 October 2004	
Jérémy Ménez	France	FW	Sochaux*	Bordeaux	4–0	22 January 2005	
Mickaël Pagis	France	FW	Strasbourg*	Caen	5–0	5 February 2005	
Matt Moussilou^{4}	Republic of the Congo	FW	Lille*	Istres	8–0	2 April 2005	
Élie Kroupi	Ivory Coast	FW	Nancy*	Rennes	6–0	27 August 2005	
Sylvain Wiltord	France	FW	Lyon	Strasbourg*	4–0	4 January 2006	
Mamadou Diallo	Senegal	FW	Nantes*	Sochaux	3–1	11 February 2006	
John Utaka	Nigeria	FW	Rennes*	Lens	4–1	18 February 2006	
John Utaka	Nigeria	FW	Rennes	Lyon*	4–1	25 February 2006	
Pauleta	Portugal	FW	Paris Saint-Germain*	Bordeaux	3–1	2 April 2006	
Élie Kroupi	Ivory Coast	FW	Nancy	Strasbourg*	3–1	30 April 2006	
Fred	Brazil	FW	Lyon*	Le Mans	8–1	13 May 2006	
Peter Odemwingie	Nigeria	FW/MF	Lille*	Lens	4–0	13 August 2006	
André-Pierre Gignac	France	FW	Lorient*	Nantes	3–1	26 August 2006	
Ismaël Bangoura	Guinea	FW	Le Mans	Auxerre*	3–2	4 November 2006	
Steve Savidan^{4}	France	FW	Valenciennes	Nantes*	5–2	10 February 2007	
Johan Elmander	Sweden	FW	Toulouse*	Bordeaux	3–1	26 May 2007	
Johan Audel	France	MF	Valenciennes*	Toulouse	3–1	4 August 2007	
Túlio de Melo	Brazil	FW	Le Mans	Sochaux*	3–1	11 August 2007	
Karim Benzema	France	FW	Lyon	Metz*	5–1	15 September 2007	
Ireneusz Jeleń	Poland	FW	Auxerre*	Lorient	5–3	20 October 2007	
Wendel Geraldo	Brazil	MF	Bordeaux*	Toulouse	4–3	2 December 2007	
Johan Elmander	Sweden	FW	Toulouse	Bordeaux*	4–3	2 December 2007	
Djibril Cissé	France	FW	Marseille*	Caen	6–1	26 January 2008	
Wendel Geraldo	Brazil	MF	Bordeaux*	Paris Saint-Germain	3–0	2 March 2008	
Mickaël Pagis	France	FW	Rennes*	Lyon	3–0	5 October 2008	
Lisandro López	Argentina	FW	Lyon	Lille*	3–4	6 December 2009	

=== 2010s ===
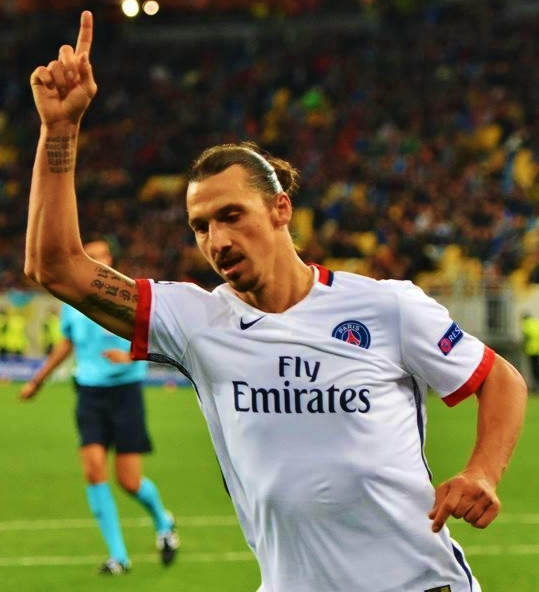
Zlatan Ibrahimović.

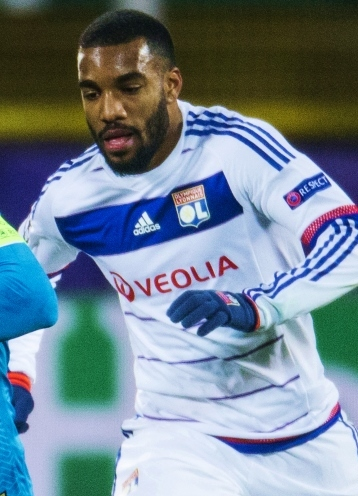
Alexandre Lacazette.

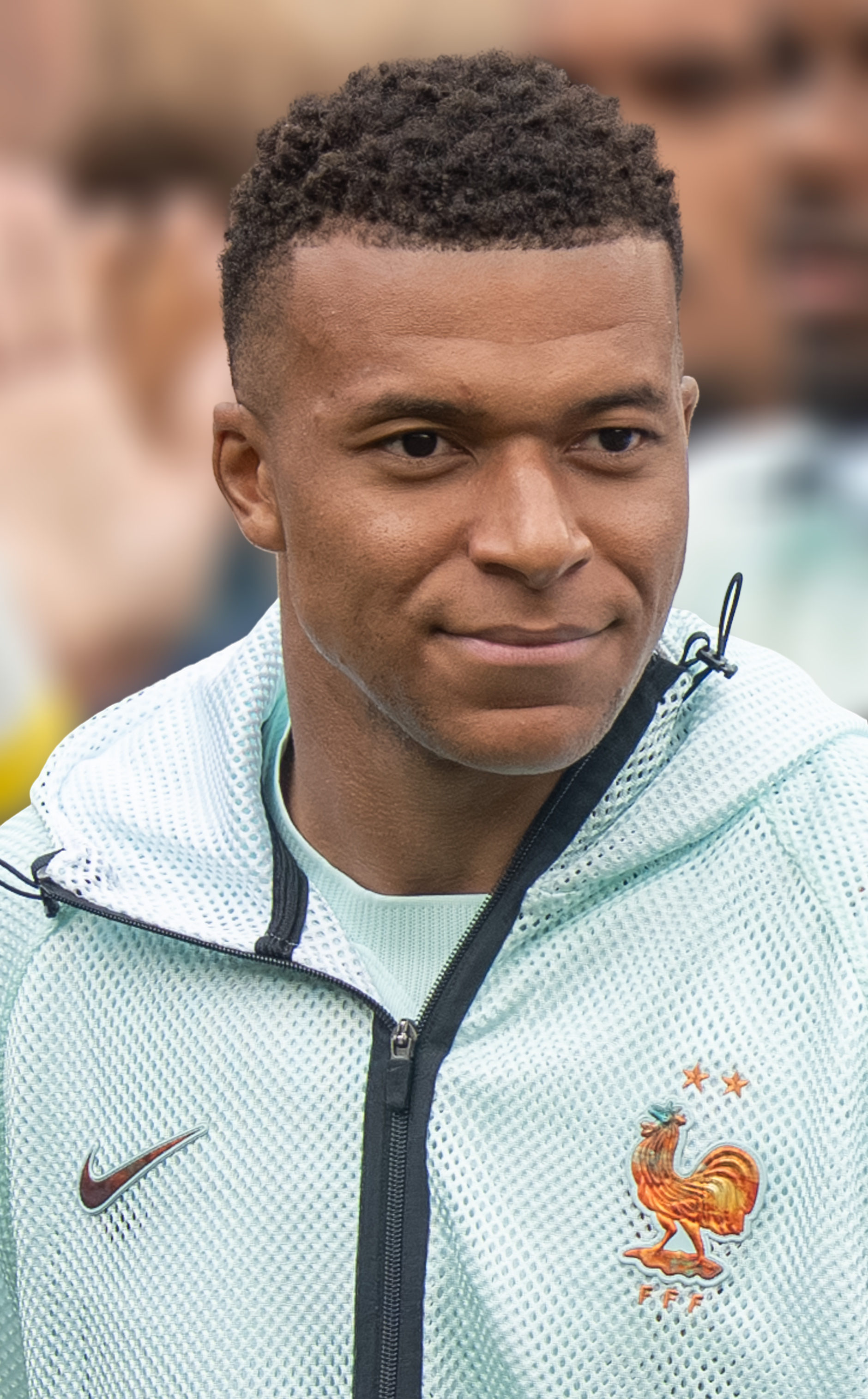
Kylian Mbappé.

Player	Nationality	Position	For	Against	Result	Date	Ref.
Mamadou Niang	Senegal	FW	Marseille*	Nancy	3–1	21 February 2010	
Michel Bastos	Brazil	MF	Lyon	Sochaux*	4–0	21 February 2010	
Mevlüt Erdinç	Turkey	FW	Paris Saint-Germain*	Sochaux	4–1	13 March 2010	
Issiar Dia	Senegal	MF	Nancy*	Lens	5–1	28 March 2010	
Toifilou Maoulida	France	FW	Lens*	Boulogne	3–0	10 April 2010	
Dimitri Payet	France	FW	Saint-Étienne*	Lens	3–1	28 August 2010	
Moussa Sow	Senegal	FW	Lille	Caen*	5–2	13 November 2010	
Anthony Modeste	France	FW	Bordeaux	Arles-Avignon*	4–2	21 November 2010	
Moussa Sow	Senegal	FW	Lille*	Lorient	6–3	5 December 2010	
Kevin Gameiro	France	FW	Lorient*	Bordeaux	5–1	19 February 2011	
Lisandro López	Argentina	FW	Lyon*	Arles-Avignon	5–0	6 March 2011	
André Ayew	Ghana	MF	Marseille*	Nice	4–2	25 April 2011	
Moussa Sow	Senegal	FW	Lille*	Rennes	3–2	29 May 2011	
Dennis Oliech	Kenya	FW	Auxerre*	Sochaux	4–1	25 September 2011	
Olivier Giroud	France	FW	Montpellier*	Dijon	5–3	15 October 2011	
Kevin Gameiro	France	FW	Paris Saint-Germain	Ajaccio*	3–1	16 October 2011	
Olivier Giroud	France	FW	Montpellier	Sochaux*	3–1	26 November 2011	
Pierre-Emerick Aubameyang	Gabon	FW	Saint-Étienne*	Lorient	4–2	22 February 2012	
Nenê	Brazil	MF	Paris Saint-Germain*	Rennes	4–0	13 May 2012	
Eden Hazard	Belgium	MF	Lille*	Nancy	4–1	20 May 2012	
Saber Khelifa	Tunisia	FW	Évian	Montpellier*	3–2	6 October 2012	
Bafétimbi Gomis	France	FW	Lyon	Marseille*	4–1	28 November 2012	
Zlatan Ibrahimović	Sweden	FW	Paris Saint-Germain	Valenciennes*	4–0	11 December 2012	
Emmanuel Rivière	France	FW	Monaco*	Montpellier	4–1	18 August 2013	
Zlatan Ibrahimović	Sweden	FW	Paris Saint-Germain*	Nice	3–1	9 November 2013	
Wissam Ben Yedder	France	FW	Toulouse*	Sochaux	5–1	30 November 2013	
Zlatan Ibrahimović	Sweden	FW	Paris Saint-Germain	Toulouse*	4–2	23 February 2014	
Salomon Kalou	Ivory Coast	FW	Lille	Ajaccio*	3–2	2 March 2014	
André Ayew	Ghana	FW	Marseille*	Ajaccio	3–1	4 April 2014	
Cheick Diabaté	Mali	FW	Bordeaux*	Guingamp	5–1	20 April 2014	
Zlatan Ibrahimović	Sweden	FW	Paris Saint-Germain*	Saint-Étienne	5–0	31 August 2014	
Alexandre Lacazette	France	FW	Lyon*	Lille	3–0	5 October 2014	
Carlos Eduardo^{5}	Brazil	MF	Nice*	Guingamp	7–2	26 October 2014	
Lucas Barrios	Paraguay	FW	Montpellier*	Metz	3–2	17 January 2015	
Divock Origi	Belgium	FW	Lille*	Rennes	3–0	15 March 2015	
Zlatan Ibrahimović	Sweden	FW	Paris Saint-Germain*	Lorient	3–1	20 March 2015	
Modibo Maïga	Mali	FW	Metz*	Toulouse	3–2	4 April 2015	
Ezequiel Lavezzi	Argentina	FW	Paris Saint-Germain*	Lille	6–1	25 April 2015	
Edinson Cavani	Uruguay	FW	Paris Saint-Germain*	Guingamp	6–0	8 May 2015	
Nabil Fekir	France	FW	Lyon*	Caen	4–0	29 August 2015	
Alexandre Lacazette	France	FW	Lyon*	Saint-Étienne	3–0	8 November 2015	
Wissam Ben Yedder	France	FW	Toulouse*	Reims	3–1	9 January 2016	
Ousmane Dembélé	France	FW	Rennes*	Nantes	4–1	6 March 2016	
Zlatan Ibrahimović^{4}	Sweden	FW	Paris Saint-Germain*	Troyes	9–0	13 March 2016	
Zlatan Ibrahimović	Sweden	FW	Paris Saint-Germain*	Nice	4–1	2 April 2016	
Hatem Ben Arfa	France	FW	Nice*	Rennes	3–0	10 April 2016	
Sofiane Boufal	Morocco	FW	Lille*	Gazélec Ajaccio	4–2	16 April 2016	
Alexandre Lacazette	France	FW	Lyon*	Monaco	6–1	7 May 2016	
Edinson Cavani	Uruguay	FW	Paris Saint-Germain	Gazélec Ajaccio*	4–0	7 May 2016	
Alexandre Lacazette	France	FW	Lyon	Nancy*	3–0	14 August 2016	
Mevlüt Erdinç	Turkey	FW	Metz	Nantes*	3–0	11 September 2016	
Edinson Cavani^{4}	Uruguay	FW	Paris Saint-Germain	Caen*	6–0	16 September 2016	
Casimir Ninga	Chad	FW	Montpellier	Dijon*	3–3	1 October 2016	
Alassane Pléa	France	FW	Nice	Metz*	4–2	23 October 2016	
Radamel Falcao	Colombia	FW	Monaco	Bordeaux*	4–0	10 December 2016	
Ola Toivonen	Sweden	FW	Toulouse*	Lorient	3–2	10 December 2016	
Bafétimbi Gomis	France	FW	Marseille*	Montpellier	5–1	27 January 2017	
Kylian Mbappé	France	FW	Monaco*	Metz	5–0	11 February 2017	
Florian Thauvin	France	FW	Marseille	Caen*	5–1	30 April 2017	
Nicolas de Préville	France	FW	Lille*	Nantes	3–0	20 May 2017	
Radamel Falcao	Colombia	FW	Monaco	Dijon*	4–1	13 August 2017	
Memphis Depay	Netherlands	FW	Lyon	Troyes*	5–0	22 October 2017	
Neymar^{4}	Brazil	FW	Paris Saint-Germain*	Dijon	8–0	17 January 2018	
Florian Thauvin	France	FW	Marseille*	Metz	6–3	2 February 2018	
Alassane Pléa^{4}	France	FW	Nice	Guingamp*	5–2	11 March 2018	
Romain Hamouma	France	FW	Saint-Étienne*	Lille	5–0	19 May 2018	
Memphis Depay	Netherlands	FW	Lyon*	Nice	3–2	19 May 2018	
Nicolas Pépé	Ivory Coast	FW	Lille	Amiens*	3–2	15 September 2018	
Kylian Mbappé^{4}	France	FW	Paris Saint-Germain*	Lyon	5–0	7 October 2018	
Emiliano Sala	Argentina	FW	Nantes*	Toulouse	4–0	20 October 2018	
Edinson Cavani	Uruguay	FW	Paris Saint-Germain	Monaco*	4–0	11 November 2018	
Florian Thauvin	France	FW	Marseille	Amiens*	3–1	25 November 2018	
Edinson Cavani	Uruguay	FW	Paris Saint-Germain*	Guingamp	9–0	19 January 2019	
Kylian Mbappé	France	FW	Paris Saint-Germain*	Guingamp	9–0	19 January 2019	
Kylian Mbappé	France	FW	Paris Saint-Germain*	Monaco	3–1	21 April 2019	
Youcef Atal	Algeria	DF	Nice*	Guingamp	3–0	28 April 2019	
Casimir Ninga	Chad	FW	Angers*	Saint-Étienne	4–1	22 September 2019	
Cristian Battocchio	Italy	MF	Brest*	Strasbourg	5–0	3 December 2019	
Josh Maja	Nigeria	FW	Bordeaux*	Nîmes	6–0	3 December 2019	

=== 2020s ===
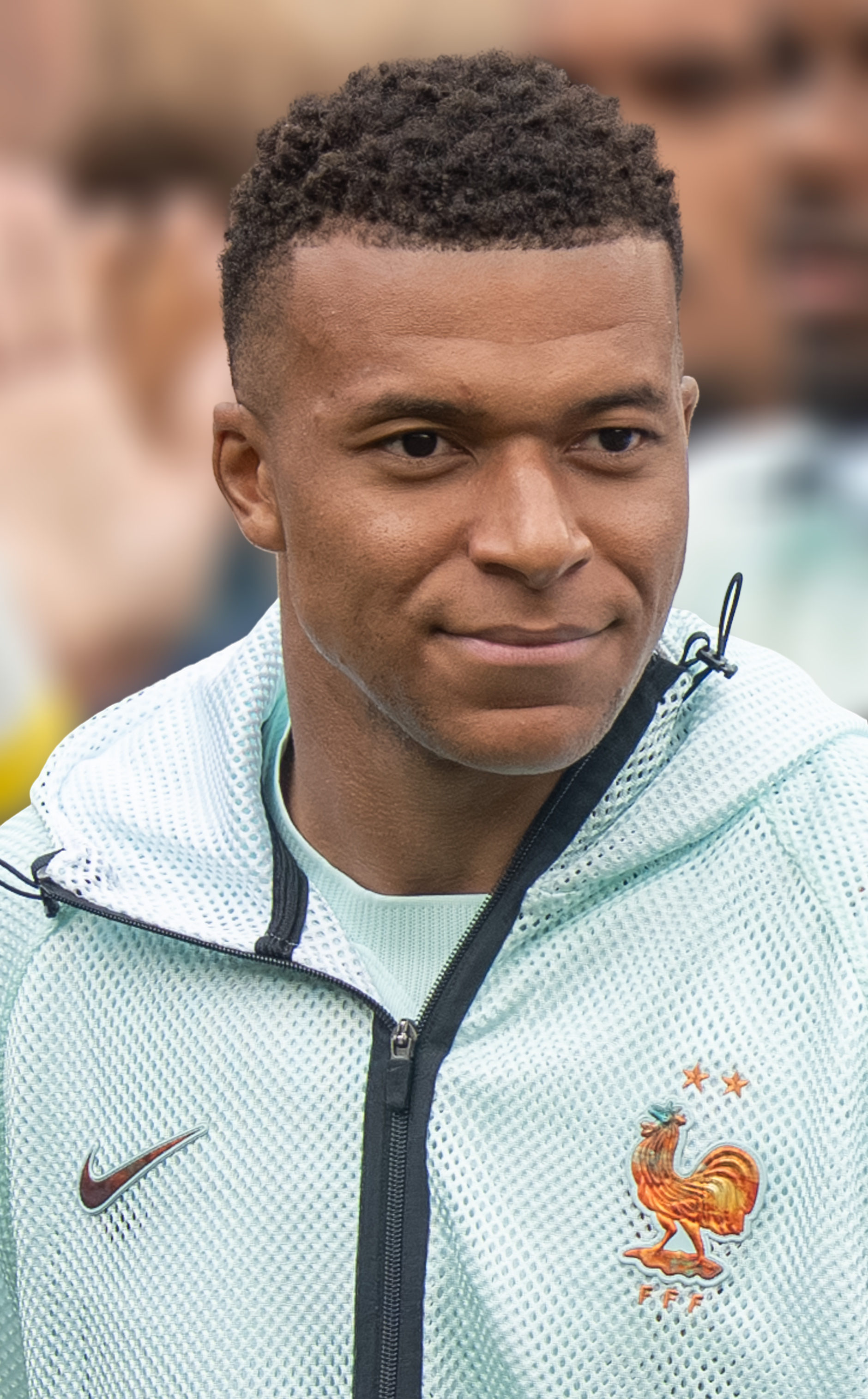
Kylian Mbappé.

Player	Nationality	Position	For	Against	Result	Date	Ref.
Darío Benedetto	Argentina	FW	Marseille	Nîmes*	3–2	28 February 2020	
Memphis Depay	Netherlands	FW	Lyon*	Dijon	4–1	28 August 2020	
Ibrahima Niane	Senegal	FW	Metz*	Lorient	3–1	4 October 2020	
Boulaye Dia	Senegal	FW	Reims	Montpellier*	4–0	25 October 2020	
Aleksandr Golovin	Russia	MF	Monaco	Nîmes*	4–3	7 February 2021	
Wahbi Khazri	Tunisia	FW	Saint-Étienne*	Bordeaux	4–1	11 April 2021	
Terem Moffi	Nigeria	FW	Lorient*	Bordeaux	4–1	25 April 2021	
Arkadiusz Milik	Poland	FW	Marseille*	Angers	3–2	16 May 2021	
Martin Terrier	France	FW	Rennes	Saint-Étienne*	5–0	5 December 2021	
Hwang Ui-jo	South Korea	FW	Bordeaux*	Strasbourg	4–3	22 January 2022	
Arkadiusz Milik	Poland	FW	Marseille*	Angers	5–2	4 February 2022	
Serhou Guirassy	France	FW	Rennes*	Metz	6–1	20 March 2022	
Kylian Mbappé	France	FW	Paris Saint-Germain	Clermont*	6–1	9 April 2022	
Neymar	Brazil	FW	Paris Saint-Germain	Clermont*	6–1	9 April 2022	
Wissam Ben Yedder	France	FW	Monaco*	Brest	4–2	14 May 2022	
Kylian Mbappé	France	FW	Paris Saint-Germain*	Metz	5–0	21 May 2022	
Andy Delort	Algeria	FW	Nice	Reims*	3–2	21 May 2022	
Florian Sotoca	France	FW	Lens*	Brest	3–2	7 August 2022	
Kylian Mbappé	France	FW	Paris Saint-Germain	Lille*	7–1	21 August 2022	
Wissam Ben Yedder	France	FW	Monaco*	Nantes	4–1	2 October 2022	
Loïs Openda	Belgium	FW	Lens*	Toulouse	3–0	28 October 2022	
Wissam Ben Yedder	France	FW	Monaco*	Ajaccio	7–1	15 January 2023	
Folarin Balogun	United States	FW	Reims*	Lorient	4–2	1 February 2023	
Jonathan David	Canada	FW	Lille*	Lyon	3–3	10 March 2023	
Loïs Openda	Belgium	FW	Lens	Clermont*	4–0	12 March 2023	
Elye Wahi^{4}	Ivory Coast	FW	Montpellier	Lyon*	4–5	7 May 2023	
Alexandre Lacazette^{4}	France	FW	Lyon*	Montpellier	5–4	7 May 2023	
Amine Gouiri	France	FW	Rennes	Ajaccio*	5–0	21 May 2023	
Kylian Mbappé	France	FW	Paris Saint-Germain	Reims*	3–0	11 November 2023	
Alexandre Lacazette	France	FW	Lyon*	Toulouse	3–0	10 December 2023	
Kamory Doumbia^{4}	Mali	MF	Brest*	Lorient	4–0	20 December 2023	
Jonathan David	Canada	FW	Lille*	Le Havre	3–0	17 February 2024	
Mahdi Camara	France	MF	Brest	Strasbourg*	3–0	24 February 2024	
Kylian Mbappé	France	FW	Paris Saint-Germain	Montpellier*	6–2	17 March 2024	
Jonathan David	Canada	FW	Lille	Le Havre*	3–0	28 September 2024	
Zuriko Davitashvili	Georgia	FW	Saint-Étienne*	Auxerre	3–1	5 October 2024	
Arnaud Kalimuendo	France	FW	Rennes*	Saint-Étienne	5–0	30 November 2024	
Alexandre Lacazette	France	FW	Lyon*	Nice	4–1	1 December 2024	
Ousmane Dembélé	France	FW	Paris Saint-Germain	Brest*	5–2	1 February 2025	
Mika Biereth	Denmark	FW	Monaco*	Auxerre	4–2	1 February 2025	
Mika Biereth	Denmark	FW	Monaco*	Nantes	7–1	15 February 2025	
Mika Biereth	Denmark	FW	Monaco*	Reims	3–0	28 February 2025	
Amine Gouiri	Algeria	FW	Marseille*	Brest	4–1	27 April 2025	
Gonçalo Ramos	Portugal	FW	Paris Saint-Germain	Montpellier*	4–1	10 May 2025	
João Neves	Portugal	FW	Paris Saint-Germain	Toulouse*	6–3	30 August 2025	
Mason Greenwood^{4}	England	FW	Marseille*	Le Havre	6–2	18 October 2025	
Esteban Lepaul	France	FW	Rennes*	Strasbourg	4–1	2 November 2025	
Endrick	Brazil	FW	Lyon	Metz*	5–2	25 January 2026	
Lassine Sinayoko	Mali	FW	Paris FC	Marseille*	3–2	6 September 2026	
Esteban Lepaul	France	FW	Rennes	Paris FC*	3–4	18 October 2026	
Achraf Hakimi	Morocco	DF	Paris Saint-Germain	Le Havre*	5–1	30 October 2026	
Elye Wahi	Ivory Coast	FW	Nice*	Rennes	5–2	30 October 2026	

== Statistics ==
=== Multiple hat-tricks ===
The following table lists the hat-tricks scored by players who have scored five or more hat-tricks.

Players in bold are still active in Ligue 1.

Rank	Player	Hat-tricks	Last hat-trick
1	(France) Thadée Cisowski	22	1 May 1960
2	(France) Hervé Revelli	14	10 November 1973
3	(France) Just Fontaine	13	4 October 1959
4	(Sweden) Gunnar Andersson	12	17 March 1957
4	(Argentina) Delio Onnis	12	21 December 1984
6	(France) Roger Piantoni	11	13 January 1963
7	(Argentina) Carlos Bianchi	10	25 May 1979
7	(France) Bernard Lacombe	10	14 December 1984
9	(Morocco) Hassan Akesbi	9	1 November 1962
9	(Algeria) Rachid Mekloufi	9	24 October 1965
9	(France) Néstor Combin	9	26 October 1974
9	(France) Kylian Mbappé	9	17 March 2024
13	(Socialist Federal Republic of Yugoslavia) Josip Skoblar	8	14 August 1973
13	(France) Jacky Vergnes	8	10 December 1978
15	(France) André Guy	7	28 September 1968
15	(Sweden) Zlatan Ibrahimović	7	2 April 2016
15	(France) Alexandre Lacazette	7	1 December 2024
18	(France) Lucien Cossou	6	29 December 1963
18	(France) Philippe Gondet	6	30 August 1967
18	(France) Jean-Pierre Papin	6	6 April 1991
21	(France) Jean Grumellon	5	10 September 1950
21	(France) Jean Baratte	5	2 September 1951
21	(France) Édouard Kargu	5	20 March 1955
21	(France) Abdesselem Ben Mohammed	5	15 January 1956
21	(France) Henri Skiba	5	23 August 1959
21	(France) Jacques Foix	5	29 April 1964
21	(France) Serge Masnaghetti	5	29 November 1964
21	(Argentina) (France) Héctor De Bourgoing	5	11 December 1966
21	(Socialist Federal Republic of Yugoslavia) Simo Nikolić	5	22 January 1983
21	(Poland) Andrzej Szarmach	5	5 November 1983
21	(Germany) Dieter Müller	5	1 March 1985
21	(Uruguay) Edinson Cavani	5	19 January 2019
21	(France) Wissam Ben Yedder	5	15 January 2023

=== Hat-tricks by nationality ===
Former country ‡

Country	No.	Last
France (FRA)	607	18 October 2026
Argentina (ARG)	57	28 February 2020
Yugoslavia (YUG)‡ (Note: In 1992, SFR Yugoslavia (YUG, 1945–1992) split into Republic of Bosnia and Herzegovina (BIH, 1992–1995), Croatia (CRO, 1992–present), Republic of Macedonia (MKD, 1993–2019), Slovenia (SVN, 1992–present), and FR Yugoslavia (YUG, 1992–2003). Subsequently, in 1995 the Republic of Bosnia and Herzegovina was reconstituted into Bosnia and Herzegovina (BIH, 1995–present) as a conclusion of the Bosnian War. The FR Yugoslavia was renamed Serbia and Montenegro (SCG, 2003–2006), while being reconstituted from a federal republic into a state union, and in 2006 was split into Serbia (SRB, 2006–present) and Montenegro (MNE, 2006–present). The Republic of Macedonia was known internationally as the Former Yugoslav Republic of Macedonia (FYROM) from 1993 until 2019, due to a naming dispute with Greece. From 2019, as a result of an agreement between the two disputing parties, the country was renamed North Macedonia (MKD).)	39	7 April 1990
Sweden (SWE)	34	10 December 2016
Algeria (ALG)	33	27 April 2025
Brazil (BRA)	26	25 January 2026
Netherlands (NED)	18	28 August 2020
Morocco (MAR)	18	30 October 2026
Senegal (SEN)	12	25 October 2020
Cameroon (CMR)	11	2 December 2000
Germany (GER)	11	9 January 1993
Ivory Coast (CIV)	11	30 October 2026
Mali (MLI)	10	6 September 2026
Luxembourg (LUX)	9	22 December 1973
Poland (POL)	9	16 May 2021
Austria (AUT)	5	13 February 1955
Belgium (BEL)	5	12 March 2023
Congo (CGO)	5	2 April 2005
Denmark (DEN)	5	28 February 2025
Portugal (POR)	5	30 August 2025
Switzerland (SUI)	5	21 March 2004
Uruguay (URU)	5	19 January 2019
Chad (CHA)	4	22 September 2019
Czechoslovakia (TCH)‡ (Note: In 1993 Czechoslovakia (TCH, 1918–1992) split into the Czech Republic (CZE, 1993–present) and Slovakia (SVK, 1993–present).)	4	25 November 1951
Nigeria (NGA)	4	25 April 2021
Romania (ROU)	4	27 March 2004
Canada (CAN)	3	28 September 2024
Gabon (GAB)	3	22 December 2012
Serbia and Montenegro (SCG)‡	3	15 December 1998
Colombia (COL)	2	13 August 2017
England (ENG)	2	18 October 2025
Ghana (GHA)	2	4 April 2014
Guinea (GUI)	2	4 November 2006
Iceland (ISL)	2	20 January 1952
Ireland (IRL)	2	2 October 1999
Italy (ITA)	2	3 December 2019
Paraguay (PAR)	2	17 January 2015
Togo (TOG)	2	20 February 2004
Tunisia (TUN)	2	11 April 2021
Burkina Faso (BFA)	1	10 January 2004
Croatia (CRO)	1	1 May 1993
DR Congo (COD)	1	24 May 2003
French Guiana (GUF)	1	27 October 2001
Georgia (GEO)	1	5 October 2024
Hungary (HUN)	1	24 March 1990
Israel (ISR)	1	17 December 1972
Kenya (KEN)	1	25 September 2011
Russia (RUS)	1	7 February 2021
Spain (ESP)	1	13 October 1962
South Korea (KOR)	1	22 January 2022
Turkey (TUR)	1	13 March 2010
