= René Alpsteg =

French footballer (1920–2001)

Personal information
- Date of birth: 3 December 1920
- Place of birth: Bonneville, Haute-Savoie, France
- Date of death: 24 December 2001 (aged 81)
- Place of death: Vétraz-Monthoux, France
- Height: 1.78 m (5 ft 10 in)
- Position: Forward

Senior career*
| Years | Team | Apps | (Gls) |
| 1940–1942 | CA Bonneville | | |
| 1942–1944 | US Annemasse | | |
| 1944–1953 | Saint-Étienne | 262 | (104) |
| 1953–1955 | Racing Besançon | 66 | (7) |
| 1955–1957 | US Annemasse | | |

International career
| 1947–1952 | France | 12 | (4) |
- * Club domestic league appearances and goals

René Alpsteg (3 December 1920 – 24 December 2001) was a French footballer who played as a forward for Saint-Étienne between 1944 and 1953, with whom he scored 104 official goals, which makes him one of the club's all-time top goal scorers. He also scored 4 goals in 12 matches for the French national team between 1947 and 1952.

== Club career ==
Born on 3 December 1920 in Bonneville, Haute-Savoie, Alpsteg began his career at his hometown club CA Bonneville in 1940, aged 20, with whom he played for two years, until 1942, when he joined US Annemasse, where he also played for two years, until 1944, when he turned professional by signing for Saint-Étienne. Together with Kader Firoud, Antoine Rodriguez, and Antoine Cuissard, he was a member of the Saint-Étienne team that achieved a runner-up finish in the 1945–46 French Division 1, only one point short of winners Lille OSC.

On 22 April 1951, Alpsteg was due to play in the midfield in a Ligue 1 fixture against Toulouse, but ended up taking the center-forward position vacated by the injured Tamini, from where he scored a 4-goal haul in a 4–0 win. The following day, the journalists of L'Équipe stated that "he played as he had in his prime, often outpacing his marker and putting in a series of shots of rare power, four of which resulted in superb goals", including a 30-meter shot for his third goal. A few months later, on 16 September 1951, he netted another 4-goal haul, this time in a 10–3 victory over Olympique de Marseille, scoring the first two from set pieces within the first five minutes of the second-half, while the other two were scored only because OM's goalkeeper Armand Liberati got injured.

Alpsteg stayed at Saint-Étienne for 9 years, from 1944 until 1953, scoring a total of 104 goals in 262 official matches, including 88 goals in 238 Ligue 1 matches. Between 1948 and 1952, he played alongside his brother Léon, a winger, thus becoming the first great pair of brothers in the club's history decades before the Tylinskis (Richard and Michel) and Revellis (Hervé and Patrick). After leaving Saint-Étienne, he joined Ligue 2 side Racing Besançon, with whom he played for two years, from 1953 until 1955, scoring 7 goals in 66 official matches. He then returned to US Annemasse, where he retired in 1957, aged 37.

== International career ==
On 26 May 1947, the 26-year-old Alpsteg made his international debut in a friendly match against the Netherlands at Colombes, scoring the opening goal in a 4–0 win. Coincidentally, his last appearance for France was also at Colombes, coming off the bench in the 4th minute to replace the injured Jean Grumellon and only 10 minutes later, he scored the opening goal with a rebound to help his side to a 3–0 win over Portugal on 20 April 1952.

In total, Alpsteg earned 12 international caps between 1947 and 1952, scoring four goals.

== Death ==
Alpsteg died in Vétraz-Monthoux on 24 December 2001, at the age of 81.

== Honours ==
Saint-Étienne

- Ligue 1:
  - Runner-up: 1945–46

== See also ==
- List of Ligue 1 hat-tricks
