= Edmond Urbanski =

French footballer (1927–1976)

Personal information
- Date of birth: ,
- Place of birth: Oignie 62, France
- Date of death: 18 July 1976 (aged 48)
- Place of death: France
- Position: Forward

Senior career*
Years	Team	Apps	(Gls)
1945–1947	Auberchicourt		
1947–1949	Béziers		
1949–1951	Toulouse	22	(11)
1950–1951	→ Nantes (on loan)	19	(11)
Total		41	(22)
- * Club domestic league appearances and goals

Edmond Urbanski (19 September 1927 – 18 July 1976) was a French footballer who played as a forward for Toulouse and Nantes in the early 1950s.

== Career ==
Born in the Nord town of Fresnes-sur-Escaut on 19 September 1927, Urbanski began his football career in the mid-1940s, playing for Auberchicourt, before joining Béziers in 1947, aged 20. There, he established himself as a highly valued player sought after by the big clubs and becoming even one of the priority recruits of Toulouse, which managed to sign him in 1949, together with fellow attacker Marcel Poblome, at the cost of much effort. During the 1949–50 season, he scored 11 goals in 22 league matches for Toulouse, including a hat-trick against Metz on 11 September 1949, to help his side to a resounding 8–2 victory. These goals helped Toulouse achieve a 4th place finish in Ligue 1, which still is the best-ever league result in the club's history.

At the start of the following season, Toulouse loaned Urbanski to Nantes as a means to support the Dutchman Jan van Geen in the Nantes attack, to which he adapted quickly, as he scored 11 goals in 19 matches in his first season there, including another league hat-trick, this time against his former club AS Béziers on 25 March 1951, to help his side to a 5–0 win. However, the sporting situation of the club worsened as they finished in 14th place. When his loan ended at the end of the season, he returned to Toulouse, where he sustained a serious injury in a training match against Saint-Gaudens in August 1951, which apparently marked the end of his career.

== See also ==
- List of Ligue 1 hat-tricks
