= Josef Humpál =

Czech footballer (1918–1984)

Personal information
- Date of birth: 30 January 1918
- Place of birth: Olomouc, Moravia, Austria-Hungary
- Date of death: 19 December 1984 (aged 66)
- Place of death: Neuchâtel, Switzerland
- Position: Striker

Senior career*
Years	Team	Apps	(Gls)
1938–1946	SK Baťa Zlín	140	(69)
1946–1951	Sochaux	160	(111)
1952–1956	Montpellier	33	(21)
1956–1957	Strasbourg	44	(17)
1957–1958	AS Béziers	10	(1)
Total		387	(219)

Managerial career
- 1951–1952: Montpellier
- 1952–1955: Strasbourg
- 1955–1958: AS Béziers
- 1958–1960: Strasbourg
- 1961–1965: Cantonal Neuchâtel FC
- 1965–1968: FC Xamax-Sports
- 1969–1970: Cantonal Neuchâtel FC
- 1973–1974: FC Yverdon-Sports
- 1982–1983: FC Fribourg
- * Club domestic league appearances and goals

Josef "Pepi" Humpál (30 January 1918 – 19 December 1984) was a Czech football player and manager. He played for SK Baťa Zlín, FC Sochaux-Montbéliard, SO Montpellier, RC Strasbourg and AS Béziers. He coached SO Montpellier, RC Strasbourg, AS Béziers in France and Cantonal Neuchâtel FC, FC Xamax-Sports, FC Yverdon-Sports and FC Fribourg in Switzerland. He was the first ever foreigner to score a hat-trick in Ligue 1.
