= Edmond Plewa =

French footballer

Personal information
- Date of birth: 15 September 1927
- Place of birth: Carvin, France
- Date of death: 20 April 1973 (aged 45)
- Place of death: Lens, France
- Position: Forward

Youth career
- US Ruch Carvin

Senior career*
Years	Team	Apps	(Gls)
- US Ruch Carvin
–1951	Club sportif Le Thillot		
1951–1952	Nancy	26	(14)
1952–1953	Metz	28	(7)
1953	Lille OSC	9	(3)
1953–1957	Valenciennes	105	(30)
1957–1959	Cannes		
1959–1962	Arras		
- * Club domestic league appearances and goals

Edmond Plewa (15 September 1927 – 20 April 1973) was a French footballer who played as a forward for Metz, Lille OSC, and Valenciennes in the 1950s.

== Career ==
Born in Carvin, Pas-de-Calais, on 15 September 1927, Plewa began his career in the youth ranks of his hometown club US Ruch Carvin, which had been created in 1923 by Polish immigrants working in the mines. In the mid-1940s, he joined Club sportif Le Thillot, remaining there until 1951, when he joined Nancy. In his first (and only) season at the club, he scored 14 goals in 26 league matches, including a hat-trick against Rennais on 18 November 1951, to help his side to a resounding 9–1 victory. In 1952, he signed for Metz, and in his first (and only) season there, he scored 13 goals in 28 official matches, including 7 goals in 25 league matches, and 6 goals in 3 cup matches, which came in the form of back-to-back hat-tricks against Toulon and USB Longwy in the round of 32 and round of 16 of the 1952–53 Coupe de France.

In 1953, Plewa joined Lille OSC, making his league debut for the club on 23 August, in which he scored a goal against Strasbourg. In late 1953, Plewa, who then had 3 goals in 9 league matches for Lille, left the club to join Valenciennes, but he is nonetheless listed in the Lille squad that won the 1953–54 French Division 1. He remained loyal to Valenciennes for four years, from 1953 until 1957; on one occasion, Plewa fell asleep because the team's coach Robert Domergue was taking too long to arrive; when he finally did, Plewa was sent back home.

== Honours ==
Lille OSC

- Ligue 1
  - Champions (1): 1953–54

== See also ==
- List of Ligue 1 hat-tricks
