= Jacques Rossignol =

French footballer (1945–2001)

Personal information
- Full name: Jacques Louis Paul Rossignol
- Date of birth: 2 December 1945
- Place of birth: Bourg-des-Comptes, France
- Date of death: 15 January 2001 (aged 55)
- Place of death: Lorient, France
- Height: 1.73 m (5 ft 8 in)
- Positions: Forward; midfielder

Youth career
- –1964: Lorient

Senior career*
Years	Team	Apps	(Gls)
1964–1970	Stade Rennais	64	(8)
1970–1977	Lorient	230+	
- * Club domestic league appearances and goals

Jacques Louis Paul Rossignol (2 December 1945 – 15 January 2001) was a French footballer who played as a forward and midfielder.

== Career ==
Rossignol began his career at the academy of Lorient. In 1964, he joined Division 1 side Stade Rennais, making four appearances in his first season at the club under Jean Prouff. He played for the club's amateur team the following season, before turning professional in 1966, and became the first substitute to enter a competitive match for the club during a match against Ajaccio the following year. He would continue playing for the first team, before being dropped to the amateur team again in 1969, only making one more professional appearance for the club in 1970.

In 1970, Rossignol left Stade Rennais to rejoin Lorient, where he played until 1977, making over 230 appearances in Division 2. While there, he also served as the club's captain.

Rossignol died in Lorient on 15 January 2001, at the age of 55.
