= Simo Nikolić (footballer) =

Yugoslav footballer

Personal information
- Full name: Simo Nikolić
- Date of birth: 28 August 1954 (age 72)
- Place of birth: Brčko, FPR Yugoslavia
- Height: 1.83 m (6 ft 0 in)
- Position: Striker

Senior career*
Years	Team	Apps	(Gls)
1974–1977	Partizan	10	(2)
1978–1980	Galenika Zemun	50	(30)
1980–1985	Lyon	150	(67)
1985–1986	Béziers	31	(17)
Total		241	(116)
- * Club domestic league appearances and goals

Simo Nikolić (Serbian Cyrillic: Симо Николић; born 28 August 1954) is a Yugoslav former footballer who played as a striker.

== Career ==
During the 1970s, Nikolić was a member of Partizan for three seasons, but managed to play just 10 league games with the Crno-beli, scoring twice. He later enjoyed two prolific seasons with Galenika Zemun in the Yugoslav Second League, securing him a transfer to French club Lyon in 1980.

== Honours ==
Partizan

- Yugoslav First League: 1975–76
