= Edmond Baraffe =

French footballer and manager (1942–2020)

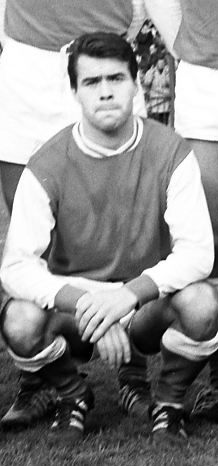
- Baraffe in 1964

Personal information
- Full name: Edmond Baraffe
- Date of birth: 19 October 1942
- Place of birth: Annœullin, France
- Date of death: 19 April 2020 (aged 77)
- Place of death: Bagnères-de-Bigorre, France
- Position: Striker

Senior career*
Years	Team	Apps	(Gls)
1960–1962	Boulogne	13	(5)
1962–1963	Red Star	6	(1)
1963–1967	Toulouse	82	(31)
1967–1968	Red Star	0	(0)
1971–1973	Lille	44	(12)
1973–1974	Cambrai	12	(4)

International career
1964–1966	France	3	(0)

Managerial career
- 1974–1976: Le Havre
- 1981–1984: Compiègne
- 1985–1989: Le Touquet
- 1989–1990: Boulogne
- * Club domestic league appearances and goals

Edmond Baraffe (19 October 1942 – 19 April 2020) was a French professional footballer who played as a striker.
