= Christian Bottollier =

French footballer (1928–2021)

Personal information
- Date of birth: 25 July 1928
- Place of birth: Chenay, France
- Date of death: 1 July 2021 (aged 92)
- Place of death: Saint-Max, France
- Positions: Forward; midfielder

Senior career*
Years	Team	Apps	(Gls)
1945–1949	CS Le Thillot		
1949–1958	Nancy		
- * Club domestic league appearances and goals

Christian Bottollier (25 July 1928 – 1 July 2021) was a French footballer who played as a forward or midfielder.

== Biography ==
Bottollier began his career with CS Le Thillot, where he played alongside Étienne Mattler. In 1949, he was recruited to play for FC Nancy as a forward. With Nancy, he was a finalist for the Coupe de France in 1953. However, he retired in 1958 following a serious knee injury.

Christian Bottollier died in Saint-Max on 1 July 2021 at the age of 92.
