= Henri Skiba =

Footballer (1927–2018)

Personal information
- Full name: Heinrich Skiba
- Date of birth: 14 July 1927
- Place of birth: Beuthen, Weimar Republic (Germany)
- Date of death: 11 March 2018 (aged 90)
- Place of death: Limoges, France
- Position: Striker

Senior career*
Years	Team	Apps	(Gls)
1949	1. FC Nürnberg	2	(0)
1950	FC Nancy	10	(0)
1950–1953	Besançon RC	75	(36)
1953–1955	Monaco	48	(18)
1955–1957	Strasbourg	62	(19)
1957–1960	Nîmes	104	(37)
1960–1961	Sochaux	42	(16)
1961–1963	Stade Français	63	(22)
1963–1965	FC La Chaux-de-Fonds		

International career
1959–1961	France	3	(0)

Managerial career
- 1963–1967: FC La Chaux-de-Fonds
- 1967–1969: Grasshoppers
- 1970: Young Boys
- 1971–1973: FC Biel-Bienne
- 1973–1977: AS Angoulême
- 1978–1981: Limoges FC
- * Club domestic league appearances and goals

Heinrich "Henri" Skiba (14 July 1927 – 11 March 2018) was a French football player and manager who played as a striker. Of German origin, he played for the France national team.

Skiba was born in German Upper Silesia. After World War II, as a refugee from Silesia, he was discovered by 1. FC Nürnberg when their "Oldies" team played a Bavarian non-league side in 1949. He was signed for the first team but appeared in only two Oberliga Süd matches in the early stages of 1949–50 before moving on to France. He became an international for the France national team and won his first full cap at 32.

As a manager, Skiba worked in Switzerland and France.

He died in Limoges, France in March 2018.
