= Serge Lenoir =

French footballer (born 1947)

Personal information
- Date of birth: 20 February 1947 (age 79)
- Place of birth: Corseul, France
- Height: 1.72 m (5 ft 8 in)
- Position: Midfielder

Senior career*
Years	Team	Apps	(Gls)
1965–1972	Rennes	112	(44)
1972–1976	Bastia	145	(30)
1976–1980	Brest	128	(38)
Total		385	(112)
- * Club domestic league appearances and goals

Serge Lenoir (born 20 February 1947) is a French former professional footballer who played for Rennes, SC Bastia and Stade Brestois.
