= Michel Lafranceschina =

French footballer and coach (1939–2024)

Personal information
- Date of birth: 28 February 1939
- Place of birth: Fontaine, France
- Date of death: 24 October 2024 (aged 85)
- Position: Forward

Senior career*
Years	Team	Apps	(Gls)
1956–1958	Grenoble	31	(12)
1958–1962	Lens	122	(46)
1962–1965	Lille	67	(29)
1965–1967	Sochaux	41	(26)
1967–1970	Limoges	88	(36)
1970–1971	Bourges	11	(1)
Total		360	(150)

Managerial career
- 1979–1981: Grenoble
- 1986: Grenoble
- * Club domestic league appearances and goals

Michel Lafranceschina (28 February 1939 – 24 October 2024) was a French football player and coach. A forward, he played for Grenoble, Lens, Lille, Sochaux, Limoges and Bourges. After his playing career, he became a coach with Grenoble. Lafranceschina died on 24 October 2024, at the age of 85.
