= Paul Sauvage (footballer) =

French footballer (1939–2019)

Personal information
- Date of birth: 17 March 1939
- Place of birth: La Souterraine, France
- Date of death: 17 December 2019 (aged 80)
- Place of death: Bordeaux, France
- Position: Striker

Senior career*
Years	Team	Apps	(Gls)
1957–1960	Limoges		
1960–1964	Reims		
1964–1967	Valenciennes		
1967–1970	Castets-en-Dorthes		
1970–1972	Limoges		

International career
1961–1965	France	6	(0)
- * Club domestic league appearances and goals

Paul Sauvage (17 March 1939 – 17 December 2019) was a French footballer.

During his club career he played for Limoges FC (1957–1960, 1970–1972), Stade de Reims (1960–1964), US Valenciennes Anzin (1964–1967), and Castets-en-Dorthes (1967–1970), and won the French championship with Reims in 1962. He earned 6 caps for the France national football team from 1961 to 1965, and was part of the squad that competed in the 1960 European Nations' Cup.

== Personal life ==
Sauvage died in Bordeaux on 17 December 2019 at the age of 80.
