= Pierre Bini =

French footballer (1923-1991)

Pierre Bini (2 August 1923 - 21 June 1991) was a French footballer from Laragne-Montéglin. He is the father of Bruno Bini.

He spent most of his career as a center half or right winger at Stade de Reims, where initially he was nicknamed Le chèvre ("the goat") because of his long legs, but soon became the darling of fans at Auguste-Delaune Stadium.

Bini played one season with the AS Saint-Etienne during the season 1951–1952 before ending his playing career due to multiple knee injuries.

Bini then developed a family business before entering politics, and was mayor of Laragne-Montéglin, Vice President of General Council of the Hautes-Alpes and a Regional Adviser. Today the stadium in his hometown is named Stade Pierre-Bini.

== Clubs ==
- Laragne Sports (1942–43)
- Équipe fédérale Marseille-Provence (1943–44)
- AS Clermont-Ferrand (1945–46)
- Stade de Reims (1946–1951) (124 matches and 45 goals in Division 1)
- AS Saint-Étienne (1951–52) (14 matches and 6 goals in Division 1)
- Arago Sport Orléanais (1952–56)

== Literature ==
- Jean Cornu: Les grandes équipes françaises de football. Famot, Genève 1978
- Pascal Grégoire-Boutreau/Tony Verbicaro: Stade de Reims - une histoire sans fin. Cahiers intempestifs, Saint-Étienne 2001 ISBN 2-911698-21-5
- Michel Hubert/Jacques Pernet: Stade de Reims. Sa légende. Atelier Graphique, Reims 1992 ISBN 2-9506272-2-6
- L'Équipe (Hg.): Stade de Reims. Un club à la Une. L'Équipe, Issy-les-Moulineaux 2006 ISBN 2-915535-41-8
- Lucien Perpère/Victor Sinet/Louis Tanguy: Reims de nos amours. 1931/1981 – 50 ans de Stade de Reims. Alphabet Cube, Reims 1981
- Jacques and Thomas Poncelet: Supporters du Stade de Reims 1935–2005. Eigenverlag, Reims 2005 ISBN 2-9525704-0-X
