= Jean Grumellon =

French footballer (1923-1991)

Personal information
- Date of birth: 1 June 1923
- Place of birth: Saint-Servan, France
- Date of death: 30 December 1991 (aged 68)
- Place of death: France
- Position: Striker

Senior career*
| Years | Team | Apps | (Gls) |
| 1941–1945 | US Servannaise | | |
| 1945–1947 | US Saint-Malo | | |
| 1947–1952 | Rennes | 156 | (107) |
| 1952 | Nice | 14 | (5) |
| 1952–1953 | Monaco | 19 | (8) |
| 1953–1954 | Le Havre | 33 | (14) |
| 1954–1956 | Rennes | 58 | (29) |
| 1956–1957 | US Saint-Malo | | |

International career
| 1949–1952 | France | 10 | (5) |
- * Club domestic league appearances and goals

Jean Grumellon (1 June 1923 – 30 December 1991) was a French professional footballer. A striker, he played for Rennes, Lille, Nice, Monaco and Le Havre between 1946 and 1956.

Grumellon was the Ligue 1 topscorer in the 1949-50 season, scoring 25 goals.
