= 1965 Coupe de France final =

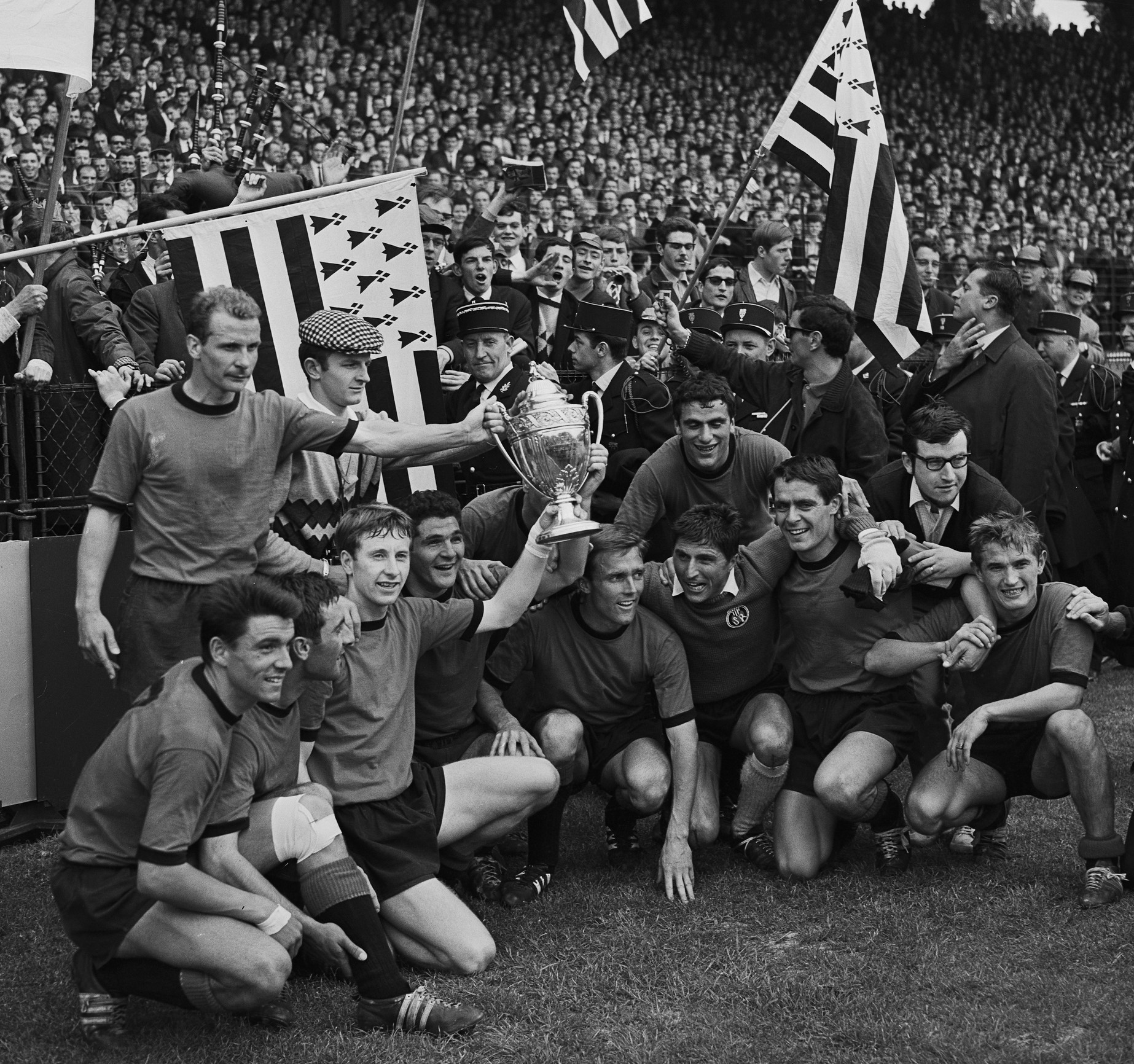
- Rennes players celebrate with the trophy
- Event: 1964–65 Coupe de France
Rennes	Sedan
Rennes	Sedan
2	2
- After extra time
- Date: 23 May 1965
- Venue: Parc des Princes, Paris
- Referee: Michel Kitabdjian
- Attendance: 36,789

Replay
Rennes	Sedan
3	1
- Date: 26 May 1965
- Venue: Parc des Princes, Paris
- Referee: Michel Kitabdjian
- Attendance: 26,792

The 1965 Coupe de France final was a football match held at Parc des Princes, Paris on 23 and 26 May 1965, that saw Stade Rennais UC defeat UA Sedan-Torcy.

== Match details ==
=== First match ===
23 May 1965

Rennes	2–2 (a.e.t.)	Sedan
Ascencio 44'; Rodighiero 61'		Marie 11'; Perrin 15'

Parc des Princes, Paris
Attendance: 36,789
Referee: Michel Kitabdjian

GK	(France) Georges Lamia
DF	(France) Jean-Claude Lavaud
DF	(France) Louis Cardiet
DF	(France) Yves Boutet (c)
DF	(France) René Cédolin
MF	(France) Marcel Loncle
MF	(France) Jean-François Prigent
FW	(France) André Ascencio
FW	(France) Daniel Rodighiero
FW	(France) Claude Dubaële
FW	(France) Giovanni Pellegrini
Manager:
(France) Jean Prouff Man Of The Match: Assistant Referees:

GK	(France) Pierre Tordo
DF	(France) Maxime Fulgenzy (c)
DF	(France) Marc Rastoll
DF	(France) Charles Gasparini
DF	(France) Roger Lemerre
MF	(France) Michel Cardoni
MF	(Spain) Emilio Salaber
MF	(France) Yves Herbet
FW	(France) André Perrin
FW	(France) Jacques Marie
FW	(France) Yvan Roy
Manager:
(France) Louis Dugauguez

=== Replay ===
26 May 1965

Rennes	3–1	Sedan
Rodighiero 47', 86'; Loncle 77'		Herbet 20' (pen.)

Parc des Princes, Paris
Attendance: 26,792
Referee: Michel Kitabdjian

STADE RENNAIS UC:
GK	(France) Georges Lamia
DF	(France) Jean-Claude Lavaud
DF	(France) Louis Cardiet
DF	(France) Yves Boutet (c)
DF	(France) Jean-Pierre Brucato
MF	(France) Marcel Loncle
MF	(France) Jean-François Prigent
FW	(France) André Ascencio
FW	(France) Daniel Rodighiero
FW	(France) Claude Dubaële
FW	(France) Giovanni Pellegrini
Manager:
(France) Jean Prouff Man Of The Match: Assistant Referees:

UA SEDAN TORCY:
GK	(France) Pierre Tordo
DF	(France) Maxime Fulgenzy (c)
DF	(France) Marc Rastoll
DF	(France) Charles Gasparini
DF	(France) Roger Lemerre
MF	(France) Jacques Marie
MF	(Spain) Emilio Salaber
MF	(France) Yves Herbet
FW	(France) André Perrin
FW	(France) Michel Cardoni
FW	(France) Yvan Roy
Manager:
(France) Louis Dugauguez

== See also ==
- Coupe de France 1964-65
