= 1971 Coupe de France final =

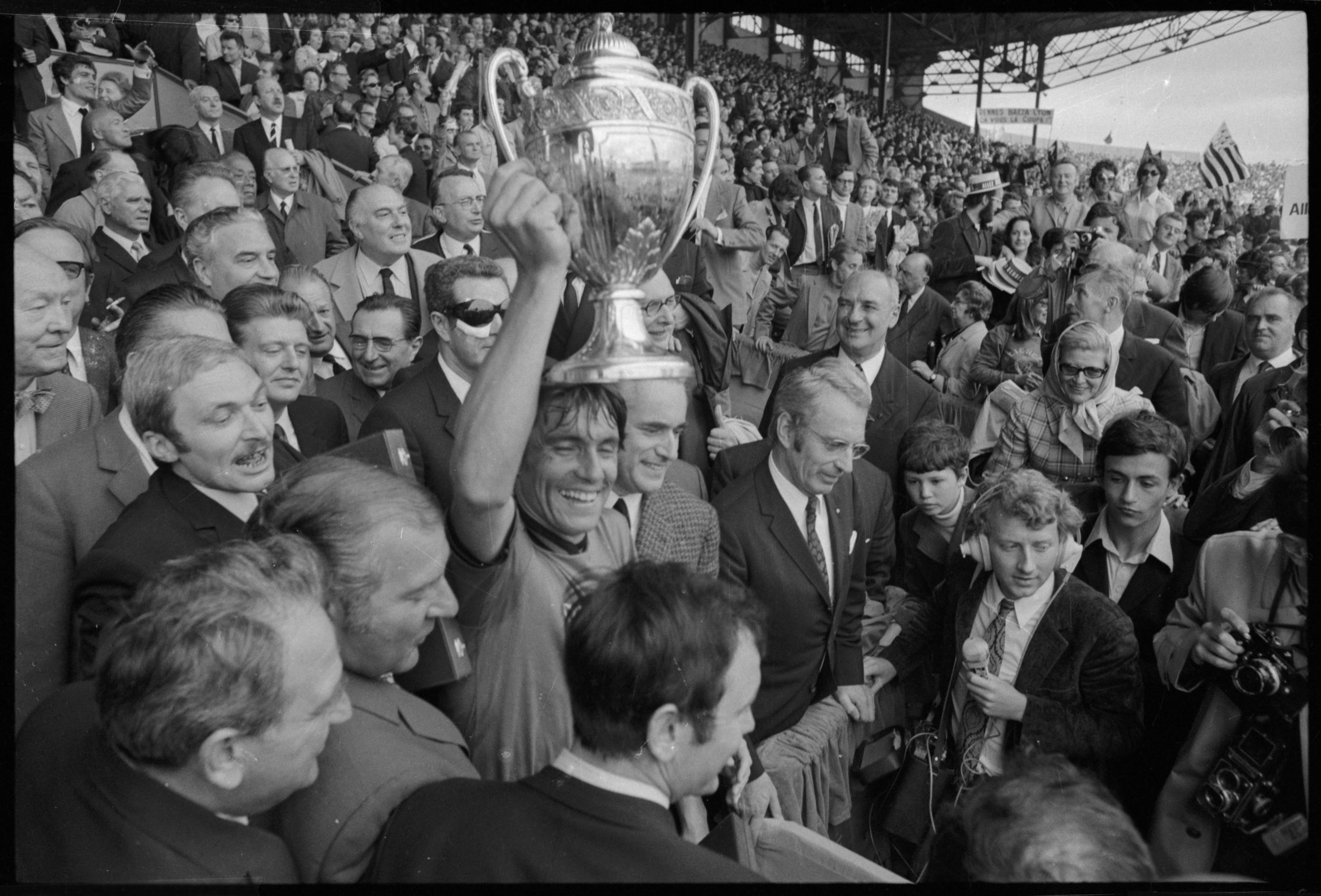
- Event: 1970–71 Coupe de France
Rennes	Lyon
1	0
- Date: 20 June 1971
- Venue: Olympique Yves-du-Manoir, Colombes
- Referee: René Vigliani
- Attendance: 46,801

The 1971 Coupe de France final was an association football match held at Stade Olympique Yves-du-Manoir, Colombes on 20 June 1971. Stade Rennais defeated Olympique Lyonnais 1–0, thanks to a goal by André Guy.

== Match Summary ==
In an overall average game opposing two teams disposed in a 4-4-2 formation, the break came from a penalty kick scored by ex-Lyon player André Guy, who had transferred to Rennes in December 1970, after a questionable foul by Robert Valette. The referee, Mr. Vigilani had previously disallowed a goal by André Betta in the 58th minute for Rennes due to an offside position by Robert Rico.

This win was Rennes' second Coupe de France victory, their first win having come in the 1965 final against Sedan-Torcy. Lyon, suffered their second defeat in the final in the fourth Coupe de France final appearance, the first loss having been against AS Monaco in 1963.

This was the last Coupe de France final to be played at the Stade Olympique Yves-du-Manoir in Colombes, as the final was played at the Parc des Princes from 1972 to 1997, and since 1998 has been played at the Stade de France.

== Match details ==
20 June 1971

Rennes	1–0	Lyon
Guy 63' (pen.)

Stade Olympique Yves-du-Manoir, Colombes
Attendance: 46,801
Referee: René Vigliani

GK	(France) Marcel Aubour
DF	(France) Alain Cosnard
DF	(France) Louis Cardiet (c)
DF	(France) René Cédolin
DF	(France) Zygmunt Chlosta
MF	(France) Pierre Garcia
MF	(Socialist Federal Republic of Yugoslavia) Velimir Naumović
MF	(France) André Guy
MF	(France) Raymond Kéruzoré
FW	(France) André Betta
FW	(France) Robert Rico
Substitutes:
Manager:
(France) Jean Prouff

GK	(France) Yves Chauveau
DF	(France) Raymond Domenech
DF	(France) Jean Baeza
DF	(Socialist Federal Republic of Yugoslavia) Ljubomir Mihajlović
DF	(France) Robert Valette	(substituted off) 79'
MF	(France) Georges Prost
MF	(France) André Perrin
MF	(France) Serge Chiesa
MF	(France) François Félix
FW	(France) Fleury Di Nallo (c)
FW	(France) Daniel Ravier
Substitutes:
MF	(France) Bernard Lhomme	(substituted in) 79'
Manager:
(France) Aimé Mignot

== See also ==
- 1970–71 Coupe de France
