= List of Ligue 1 winning managers =

The following is a list of association football managers who won Ligue 1 (French pronunciation: [liɡ œ̃], the top French professional league in the French football league system, since its establishment in 1932. Contested by eighteen clubs, it operates on a system of promotion and relegation with second-tier Ligue 2. The league was inaugurated on 11 September 1932 under the name National before switching to Division 1 in 1933. The name lasted for almost seven decades before it was changed to its current name in 2002. The reigning champions are Paris Saint-Germain, who won their fourteenth title in the 2025–26 season under the management of Luis Enrique.

== Winning managers ==
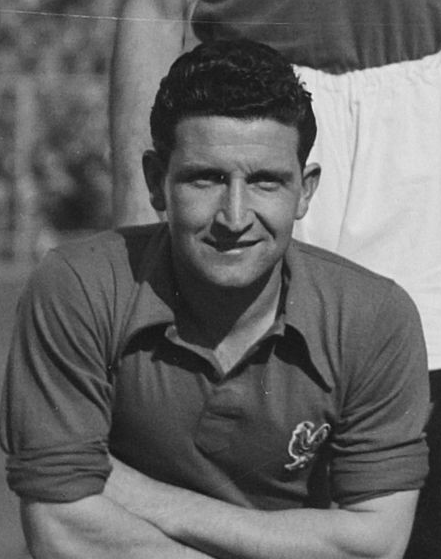
Albert Batteux (1919–2003) is by far the most successful manager in the history of French club football, having won eight league and three French Cup titles coaching Reims and Saint-Étienne between 1953 and 1970.

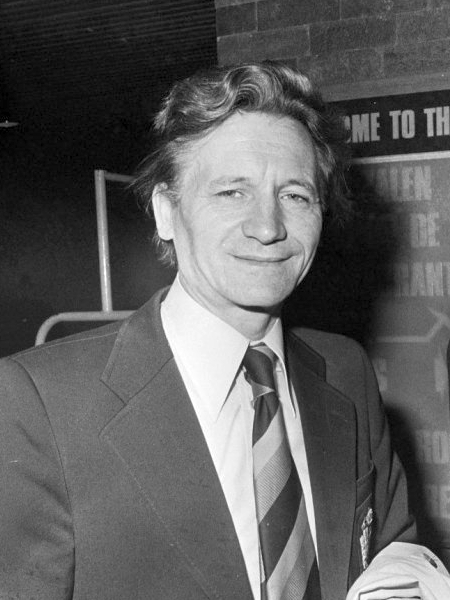
Belgian Raymond Goethals won two titles with Marseille, in 1991 and 1992. His third consecutive title with Marseille in 1993 was later rescinded by the French Football Federation due to a match-fixing scandal.

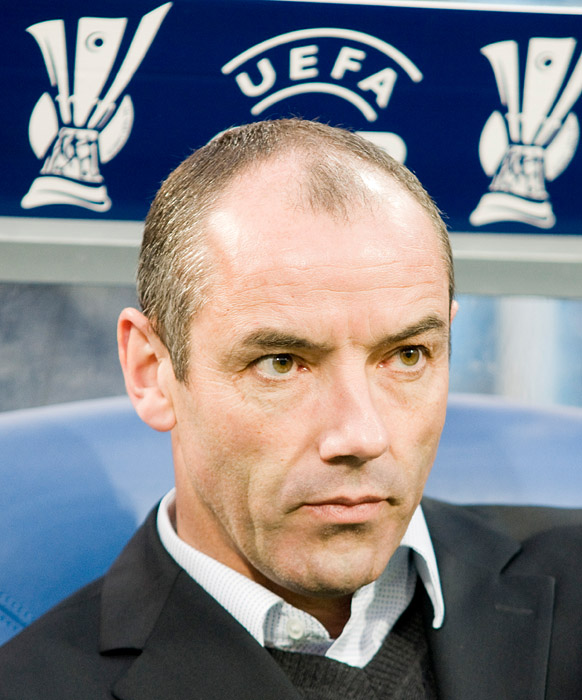
Paul Le Guen won three consecutive titles with Lyon from 2003 to 2005 during the club's period of dominance in the 2000s.

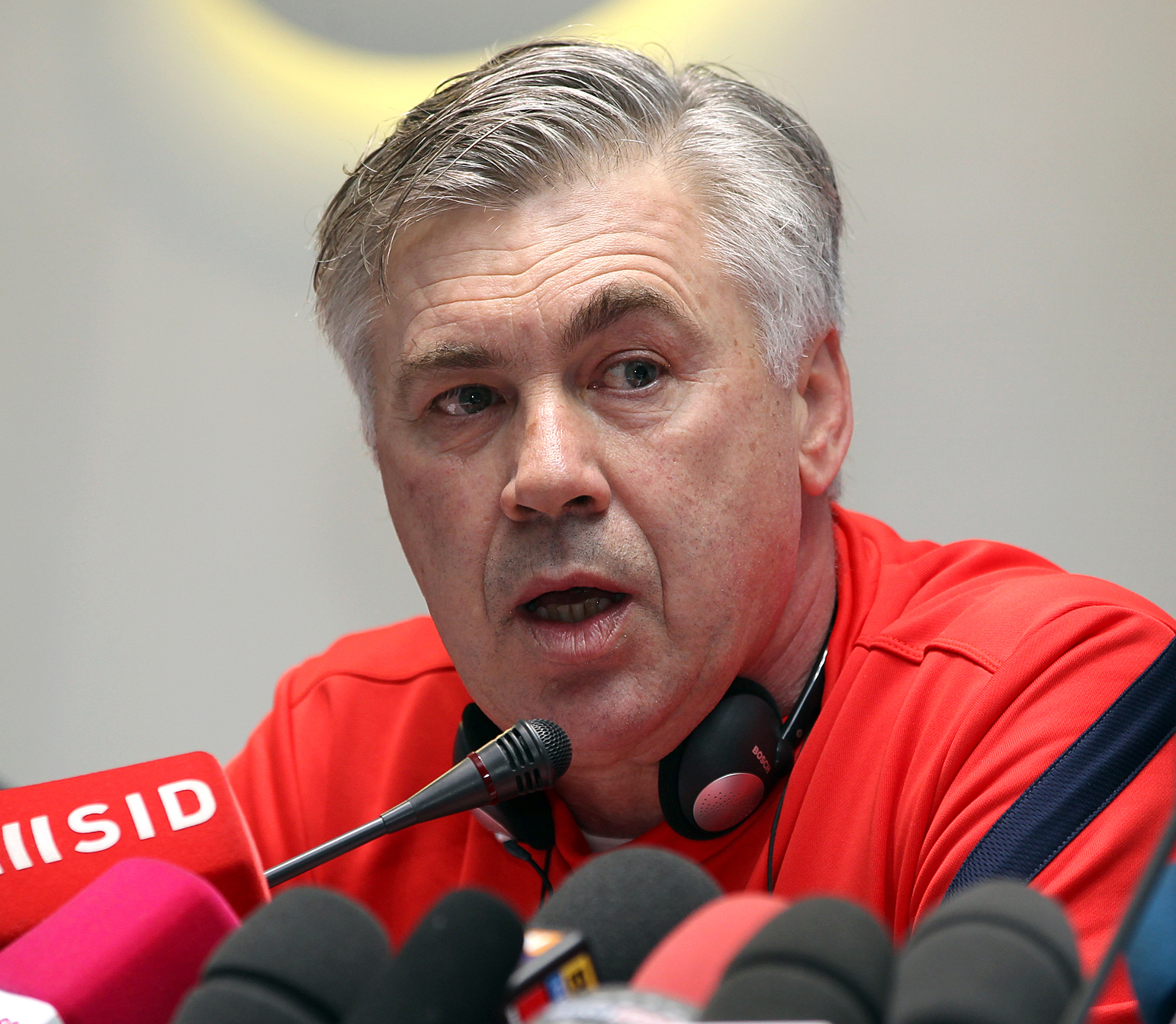
Italy's Carlo Ancelotti won the Ligue 1 with Paris Saint-Germain in 2013. It was his third different national championship title, having previously won league titles in Italy and England.

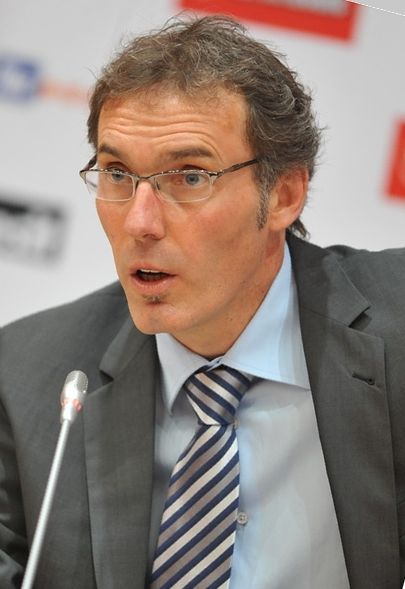
Laurent Blanc won four league titles, with Bordeaux (2009) and Paris Saint-Germain (2014, 2015, 2016).

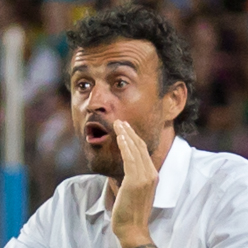
Luis Enrique is the most recent manager to win Ligue 1, with Paris Saint-Germain in 2026.

Key

#	Winning team also won the continental Treble.
†	Winning team also won the continental Double.
§	Winning manager also won the domestic Treble
†	Winning manager also won the domestic Double.

Season	Manager		Club (Titles)	Ref.
Season	Name (Titles)	Nationality	Club (Titles)	Ref.
1932–33 (1st)	Robert De Veen	BEL	Olympique Lillois (1)	
1933–34 (2nd)	René Dedieu	FRA	Sète (1)	
1934–35 (3rd)	Conrad Ross	URU	Sochaux (1)	
1935–36 (4th)	Sid Kimpton	ENG	RC Paris (1)	
1936–37 (5th)	József Eisenhoffer	HUN	Marseille (1)	
1937–38 (6th)	Conrad Ross (2)	URU	Sochaux (2)	
1938–39 (7th)	Jean Marmiès	FRA	Sète (2)	
1939–40	Championship suspended 1939–1945 due to World War II.^{[A]}			
1940–41	Championship suspended 1939–1945 due to World War II.^{[A]}			
1941–42	Championship suspended 1939–1945 due to World War II.^{[A]}			
1942–43	Championship suspended 1939–1945 due to World War II.^{[A]}			
1943–44	Championship suspended 1939–1945 due to World War II.^{[A]}			
1944–45	Championship suspended 1939–1945 due to World War II.^{[A]}			
1945–46 (8th)	Bill Berry	ENG	Lille (1)	
1946–47 (9th)	Charles Demeillez	FRA	Roubaix-Tourcoing (1)	
1947–48 (10th)	József Zilisy	HUN	Marseille (2)	
1948–49 (11th)	Henri Roessler	FRA	Reims (1)	
1949–50 (12th)	André Gérard	FRA	Bordeaux (1)	
1950–51 (13th)	Numa Andoire	FRA	Nice (1)	
1951–52 (14th)	Numa Andoire (2)	FRA	Nice (2)	
1952–53 (15th)	Albert Batteux	FRA	Reims (2)	
1953–54 (16th)	André Cheuva	FRA	Lille (2)	
1954–55 (17th)	Albert Batteux (2)	FRA	Reims (3)	
1955–56 (18th)	Luis Carniglia	ARG	Nice (3)	
1956–57 (19th)	Jean Snella	FRA	Saint-Étienne (1)	
1957–58 (20th)	Albert Batteux (3)	FRA	Reims (4)	
1958–59 (21st)	Jean Luciano	FRA	Nice (4)	
1959–60 (22nd)	Albert Batteux (4)	FRA	Reims (5)	
1960–61 (23rd)	Lucien Leduc	FRA	Monaco (1)	
1961–62 (24th)	Albert Batteux (5)	FRA	Reims (6)	
1962–63 (25th)	Lucien Leduc (2)	FRA	Monaco (2)	
1963–64 (26th)	Jean Snella (2)	FRA	Saint-Étienne (2)	
1964–65 (27th)	José Arribas	FRA	Nantes (1)	
1965–66 (28th)	José Arribas (2)	FRA	Nantes (2)	
1966–67 (29th)	Jean Snella (3)	FRA	Saint-Étienne (3)	
1967–68 (30th)	Albert Batteux (6)	FRA	Saint-Étienne (4)	
1968–69 (31st)	Albert Batteux (7)	FRA	Saint-Étienne (5)	
1969–70 (32nd)	Albert Batteux (8)	FRA	Saint-Étienne (6)	
1970–71 (33rd)	Lucien Leduc (3)	FRA	Marseille (3)	
1971–72 (34th)	Mario Zatelli	FRA	Marseille (4)	
1972–73 (35th)	José Arribas (3)	FRA	Nantes (3)	
1973–74 (36th)	Robert Herbin	FRA	Saint-Étienne (7)	
1974–75 (37th)	Robert Herbin (2)	FRA	Saint-Étienne (8)	
1975–76 (38th)	Robert Herbin (3)	FRA	Saint-Étienne (9)	
1976–77 (39th)	Jean Vincent	FRA	Nantes (4)	
1977–78 (40th)	Lucien Leduc (4)	FRA	Monaco (3)	
1978–79 (41st)	Gilbert Gress	FRA	Strasbourg (1)	
1979–80 (42nd)	Jean Vincent (2)	FRA	Nantes (5)	
1980–81 (43rd)	Robert Herbin (4)	FRA	Saint-Étienne (10)	
1981–82 (44th)	Gérard Banide	FRA	Monaco (4)	
1982–83 (45th)	Jean-Claude Suaudeau	FRA	Nantes (6)	
1983–84 (46th)	Aimé Jacquet	FRA	Bordeaux (2)	
1984–85 (47th)	Aimé Jacquet (2)	FRA	Bordeaux (3)	
1985–86 (48th)	Gérard Houllier	FRA	Paris Saint-Germain (1)	
1986–87 (49th)	Aimé Jacquet (3)	FRA	Bordeaux (4)	
1987–88 (50th)	Arsène Wenger	FRA	Monaco (5)	
1988–89 (51st)	Gérard Gili	FRA	Marseille (5)	
1989–90 (52nd)	Gérard Gili (2)	FRA	Marseille (6)	
1990–91 (53rd)	Raymond Goethals	BEL	Marseille (7)	
1991–92 (54th)	Raymond Goethals (2)	BEL	Marseille (8)	
1992–93 (55th)	Title rescinded due to bribery scandal.^{[B]}			
1993–94 (56th)	Artur Jorge	POR	Paris Saint-Germain (2)	
1994–95 (57th)	Jean-Claude Suaudeau (2)	FRA	Nantes (7)	
1995–96 (58th)	Guy Roux	FRA	Auxerre (1)	
1996–97 (59th)	Jean Tigana	FRA	Monaco (6)	
1997–98 (60th)	Daniel Leclercq	FRA	Lens (1)	
1998–99 (61st)	Élie Baup	FRA	Bordeaux (5)	
1999–2000 (62nd)	Claude Puel	FRA	Monaco (7)	
2000–01 (63rd)	Raynald Denoueix	FRA	Nantes (8)	
2001–02 (64th)	Jacques Santini	FRA	Lyon (1)	
2002–03 (65th)	Paul Le Guen	FRA	Lyon (2)	
2003–04 (66th)	Paul Le Guen (2)	FRA	Lyon (3)	
2004–05 (67th)	Paul Le Guen (3)	FRA	Lyon (4)	
2005–06 (68th)	Gérard Houllier (2)	FRA	Lyon (5)	
2006–07 (69th)	Gérard Houllier (3)	FRA	Lyon (6)	
2007–08 (70th)	Alain Perrin	FRA	Lyon (7)	
2008–09 (71st)	Laurent Blanc	FRA	Bordeaux (6)	
2009–10 (72nd)	Didier Deschamps	FRA	Marseille (9)	
2010–11 (73rd)	Rudi Garcia	FRA	Lille (3)	
2011–12 (74th)	René Girard	FRA	Montpellier (1)	
2012–13 (75th)	Carlo Ancelotti	ITA	Paris Saint-Germain (3)	
2013–14 (76th)	Laurent Blanc (2)	FRA	Paris Saint-Germain (4)	
2014–15 (77th)	Laurent Blanc (3)	FRA	Paris Saint-Germain (5)	
2015–16 (78th)	Laurent Blanc (4)	FRA	Paris Saint-Germain (6)	
2016–17 (79th)	Leonardo Jardim	POR	Monaco (8)	
2017–18 (80th)	Unai Emery	ESP	Paris Saint-Germain (7)	
2018–19 (81st)	Thomas Tuchel	GER	Paris Saint-Germain (8)	
2019–20 (82nd)	Thomas Tuchel (2)	GER	Paris Saint-Germain (9)	
2020–21 (83rd)	Christophe Galtier	FRA	Lille (4)	
2021–22 (84th)	Mauricio Pochettino	ARG	Paris Saint-Germain (10)	
2022–23 (85th)	Christophe Galtier (2)	FRA	Paris Saint-Germain (11)	
2023–24 (86th)	Luis Enrique	ESP	Paris Saint-Germain (12)	
2024–25 (87th)	Luis Enrique (2)	ESP	Paris Saint-Germain (13)	
2025–26 (88th)	Luis Enrique (3)	ESP	Paris Saint-Germain (14)	

== Multiple winners ==
† denotes managers currently coaching in Ligue 1, as of May 2026.

Rank	Manager	Titles	Club(s) (titles)	Winning years
1	(France) Albert Batteux	8	Reims (5), Saint-Étienne (3)	1953, 1955, 1958, 1960, 1962, 1968, 1969, 1970
2	(France) Lucien Leduc	4	Monaco (3), Marseille (1)	1961, 1963, 1971, 1978
2	(France) Robert Herbin	4	Saint-Étienne (4)	1974, 1975, 1976, 1981
2	(France) Laurent Blanc	4	Bordeaux (1), Paris Saint-Germain (3)	2009, 2014, 2015, 2016
5	(France) Jean Snella	3	Saint-Étienne (3)	1957, 1964, 1967
5	(France) José Arribas	3	Nantes (3)	1965, 1966, 1973
5	(France) Aimé Jacquet	3	Bordeaux (3)	1984, 1985, 1987
5	(France) Gérard Houllier	3	Paris Saint-Germain (1), Lyon (2)	1986, 2006, 2007
5	(France) Paul Le Guen	3	Lyon (3)	2003, 2004, 2005
5	(Spain) Luis Enrique †	3	Paris Saint-Germain (3)	2024, 2025, 2026
11	(Uruguay) Conrad Ross	2	Sochaux (2)	1935, 1938
11	(France) Numa Andoire	2	Nice (2)	1951, 1952
11	(France) Jean Vincent	2	Nantes (2)	1977, 1980
11	(France) Gérard Gili	2	Marseille (2)	1989, 1990
11	(Belgium) Raymond Goethals	2	Marseille (2)	1991, 1992
11	(France) Jean-Claude Suaudeau	2	Nantes (2)	1983, 1995
11	(Germany) Thomas Tuchel	2	Paris Saint-Germain (2)	2019, 2020
11	(France) Christophe Galtier	2	Lille (1), Paris Saint-Germain (1)	2021, 2023

== Winners by nationality ==
Country	Managers	Titles
France	36	67
Spain	2	4
Belgium	2	3
Argentina	2	2
England	2	2
Hungary	2	2
Portugal	2	2
Germany	1	2
Uruguay	1	2
Italy	1	1
Total	51	87

== Notes ==
A. During World War II, competitive football was suspended by the French government, although football clubs continued playing in regional competitions. During these so-called "war championships", professionalism was abolished by the Vichy regime and clubs were forced to participate in regional leagues, designated Zone Sud (South Zone) and Zone Nord (North Zone). The Ligue de Football Professionnel (LFP) and the French Football Federation (FFF) do not recognise these championships played between 1939 and 1945.

B. The 1992–93 season was originally won by Marseille, under the management of Jean Fernandez (August–November 1992) and Raymond Goethals (November 1992 – June 1993). The title was originally attributed to Goethals' as his third consecutive title with the club. However, in September 1993 the French Football Federation rescinded Marseille's championship title due to a match fixing scandal in which Marseille had allegedly offered bribes to several Valenciennes players so that they would lose their home fixture against Marseille played in May 1993. Although Paris Saint-Germain managed by Artur Jorge had finished the season as runners-up, with four points behind Marseille, the title eventually remained unattributed by the FFF and no winner was ever declared for the 1992–93 season.

== See also ==
- List of English football championship winning managers
- List of Spanish football championship winning managers
