= Aimé Jacquet =

French football player (born 1941)

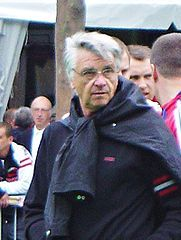
- Jacquet in 2005

Personal information
- Full name: Aimé Étienne Jacquet
- Date of birth: 27 November 1941 (age 84)
- Place of birth: Sail-sous-Couzan, Loire, France
- Height: 1.82 m (6 ft 0 in)
- Position: Defensive midfielder

Youth career
- 1958–1960: Sail-sous-Couzan

Senior career*
Years	Team	Apps	(Gls)
1960–1973	Saint-Étienne	192	(23)
1973–1975	Lyon	22	(2)
Total		214	(25)

International career
1968	France	2	(0)

Managerial career
- 1976–1980: Lyon
- 1980–1989: Bordeaux
- 1989–1990: Montpellier
- 1990–1991: Nancy
- 1992–1993: France (assistant)
- 1993–1998: France
Medal record
Representing France (as manager)
FIFA World Cup
Winner	1998 France
- * Club domestic league appearances and goals

Aimé Étienne Jacquet (French pronunciation: [eme ʒakɛ]; born 27 November 1941) is a French former professional football player and manager. He was the manager of the France national team from 1993 until 1998.

He managed France to victory in the 1998 FIFA World Cup as the host nation, stepping down from his position immediately after the tournament.

== Early life ==
Jacquet was born in Sail-sous-Couzan, Loire. He began his career as an amateur player for his local club, US Couzan, while working in a factory.

== Playing career ==
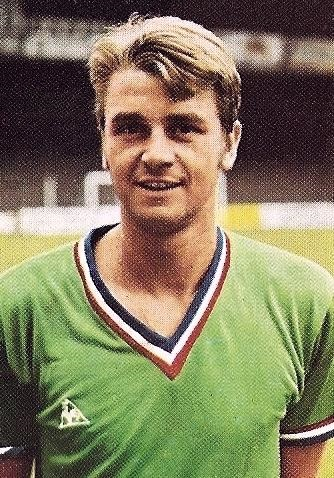
Jacquet as a player with Saint-Étienne in 1970

Scouted by Saint-Étienne, he joined Les Verts in 1960. One of the most successful clubs of the time, Saint-Étienne, won an impressive five league titles and three French Cups in his eleven years with the club. He also played for the French national team, playing two games in 1968. In 1973, he left Saint-Étienne for regional rivals Lyon, where he ended his career as a player.

== Managerial career ==
Jacquet pursued a solid managerial career for several clubs in France and gained an impressive list of accolades, most notably for Bordeaux during the 1980s, leading them to three league titles, two French Cups, two European semi-finals and one-quarter-final. Dismissed by President Claude Bez in 1989, he left Bordeaux to hone his managerial skills with more modest teams like Montpellier, and Nancy.

In 1991, he accepted a position with the National Technical Department (DTN, Direction Technique Nationale).

In 1992, he was appointed the assistant to then national team manager Gérard Houllier.

=== France national team ===
After the France national team was knocked out of qualifying for the 1994 FIFA World Cup, finishing third of the group behind Sweden and Bulgaria, Jacquet was made the manager of the national team, but only provisionally. After a promising series of friendly matches including a victory over Italy, his provisional status was upgraded to permanent.

Jacquet initially selected Eric Cantona as captain and made him the team's playmaker. Cantona was successfully establishing his career in the FA Premier League and was playing some of the best football of his career, but notoriously kicked a Crystal Palace fan in January 1995, which earned him a year-long suspension from all international matches.

As Cantona was the key playmaker, Jacquet was forced to make major changes to the team in the wake of his suspension. Jacquet revamped the squad with some new blood and built it around Zinedine Zidane and other younger players while dropping Cantona, Jean-Pierre Papin, and David Ginola. Jacquet succeeded in helping France qualify for the Euro 96.

Making it all the way to the semi-finals, Les Bleus managed to show they could survive without veterans such as Papin, Cantona or Ginola. Jacquet himself stated that the team had done well without Cantona, and that he wanted to keep faith with the players who had taken them this far.

==== 1998 World Cup triumph ====
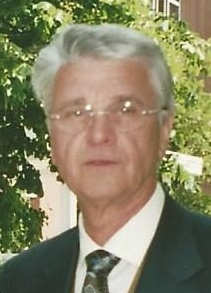
Jacquet in 1998.

In the months that followed the Euro 96, Jacquet honed his team's skills in a series of friendly matches. He adopted a very defensive strategy. The press began to criticize the team manager, calling his methods "paleolithic".

In June 1997 at Le Tournoi, cries of "Resign!" could be heard from the crowd as the French team finished third behind England and Brazil, only coming out ahead of Italy by virtue of goal difference. The media also continued to criticize Jacquet.

The media's distrust of Jacquet reached fever pitch in May 1998 when, instead of a list of 22 players meant to play in the World Cup, Jacquet gave a list of 28 players, causing the sports daily L'Équipe to write an editorial arguing that Jacquet was not the right man to lead the French team to victory.

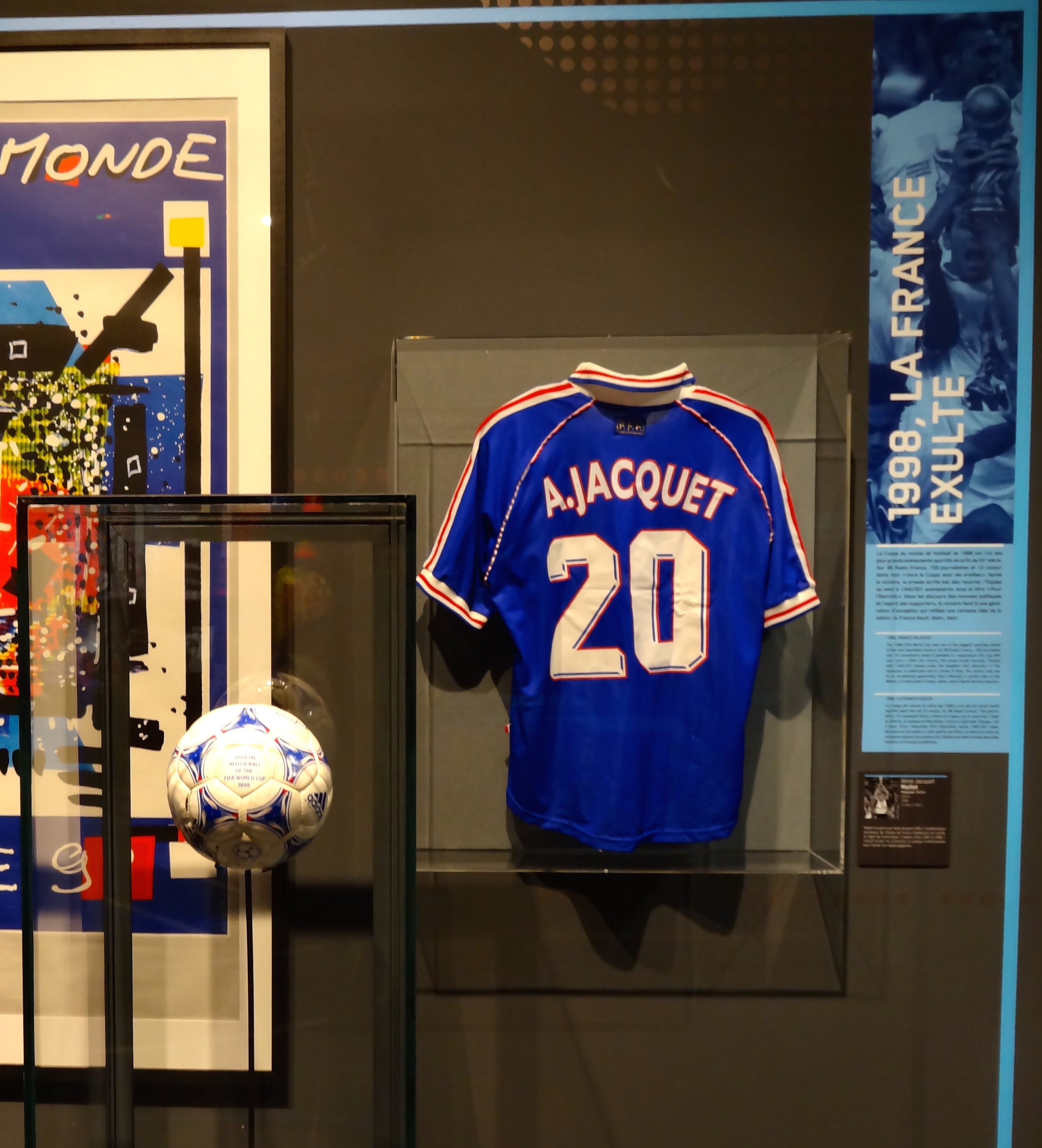
A display at the Musée National du Sport, featuring a France 1998 jersey with Jacquet's name and a match ball used during the 1998 FIFA World Cup final.

However, all that changed when the team kicked off their 1998 FIFA World Cup campaign in the group stage. It was clear that though Jacquet's team was far from being the most flamboyant in the French team history, it was a perfectly well-oiled machine that neither injury, nor expulsions, nor suspensions, managed to stop. Advancing through the group stage with a perfect record, France faced a challenging path in the knockout phase. After overcoming Paraguay with a golden goal in the round of 16 and defeating Italy in a tense quarter-final penalty shootout, the hosts maintained their momentum by rallying to beat Croatia in the semi-finals. Driven by a resilient defense and the tactical discipline instilled by Jacquet, the team secured their place in the final, where they would face defending champion Brazil.

On 12 July 1998, France soundly beat Brazil 3–0 in the final, to become world champion for the first time in its history. Crucial to the win, Jacquet identified Brazil's defensive fragility at set-pieces, which allowed Zidane to capitalize by nodding two goals from corner kicks.

Following the victory, Jacquet announced that he was leaving his position as manager of the France national team due to previous pressures and criticisms against him. He then became technical director of French football in August 1998, a position which he held until his retirement in December 2006.

== Career statistics ==
=== Club ===
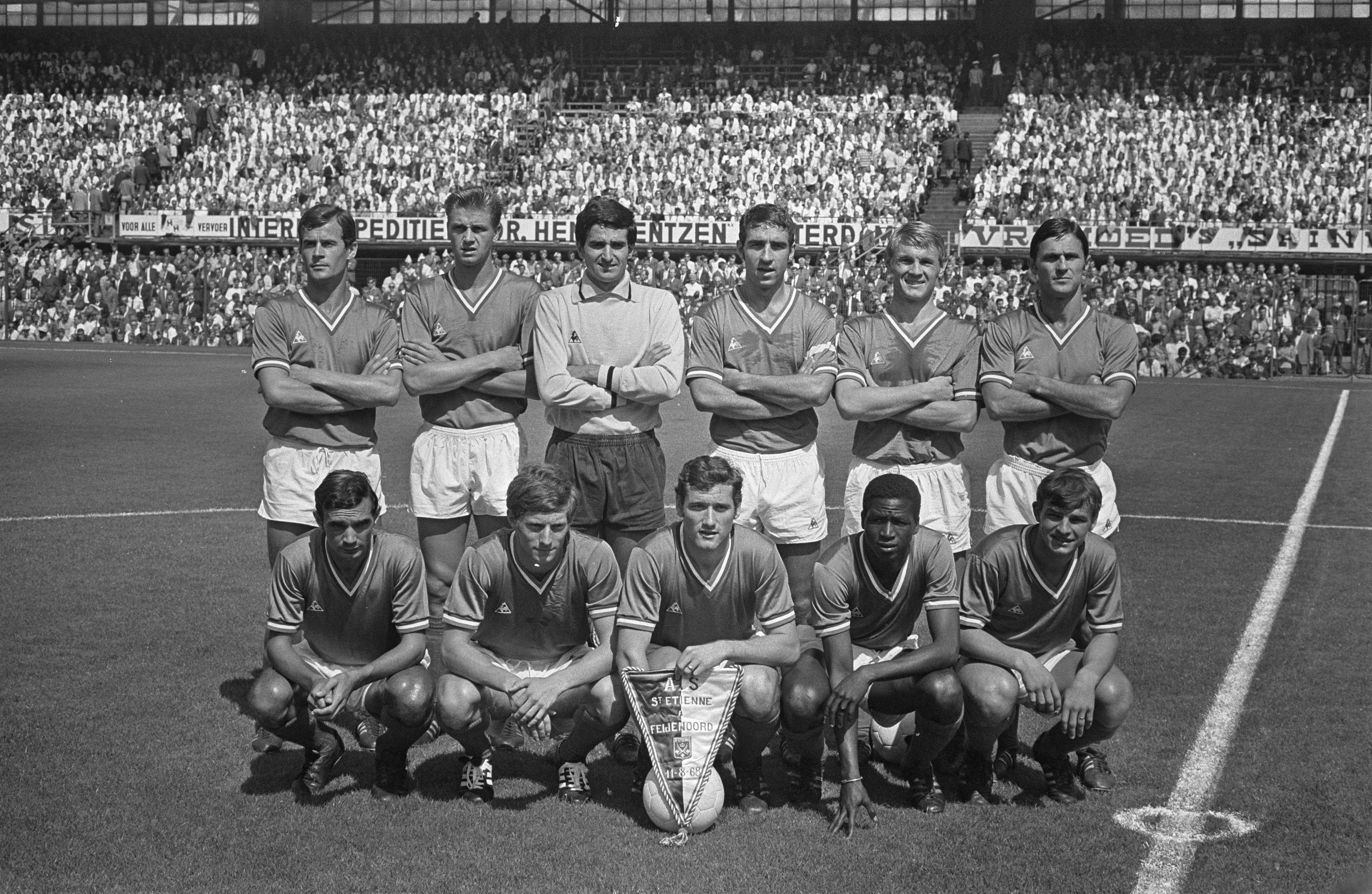
Jacquet (top row, second left) with Saint-Étienne, the Division 1 winning team of 1968.

Appearances and goals by club, season and competition
Club	Season	League			Coupe de France		Continental		Other (Note: Includes Coupe Charles Drago (1963–64) and Trophée des champions)		Total	
Club	Season	Division	Apps	Goals	Apps	Goals	Apps	Goals	Apps	Goals	Apps	Goals
Saint-Étienne	1960–61	Division 1	2	1	0	0	–		–		2	1
Saint-Étienne	1961–62	Division 1	0	0	0	0	–		–		0	0
Saint-Étienne	1962–63	Division 2	2	1	0	0	0	0	0	0	2	1
Saint-Étienne	1963–64	Division 1	2	0	2	0	–		2	0	6	0
Saint-Étienne	1964–65	Division 1	3	0	0	0	0	0	–		3	0
Saint-Étienne	1965–66	Division 1	27	2	1	0	–		–		28	2
Saint-Étienne	1966–67	Division 1	36	5	2	0	–		–		38	5
Saint-Étienne	1967–68	Division 1	35	3	6	0	4	1	0	0	45	4
Saint-Étienne	1968–69	Division 1	31	3	4	0	2	0	1	0	38	3
Saint-Étienne	1969–70	Division 1	23	4	8	1	3	0	1	0	35	5
Saint-Étienne	1970–71	Division 1	0	0	0	0	0	0	0	0	0	0
Saint-Étienne	1971–72	Division 1	2	1	0	0	0	0	–		2	1
Saint-Étienne	1972–73	Division 1	29	3	4	1	–		–		33	4
Saint-Étienne	Total		192	23	27	2	9	1	4	0	232	26
Lyon	1973–74	Division 1	15	2	1	1	3	0	0	0	19	3
Lyon	1974–75	Division 1	7	0	0	0	1	0	–		8	0
Lyon	Total		22	2	1	1	4	0	0	0	27	3
Career total			214	25	28	3	13	1	4	0	259	29

=== International ===
Appearances and goals by national team and year
National team	Year	Apps	Goals
France	1968	2	0
Total		2	0

=== Managerial ===
Team	From	To	Record				
Team	From	To	G	W	D	L	Win %
Lyon	February 1976	July 1980	183	65	42	76	35.52
Bordeaux	July 1980	February 1989	422	219	115	88	51.90
Montpellier	July 1989	February 1990	25	7	5	13	28.00
Nancy	July 1990	July 1991	40	12	11	17	30.00
France	17 December 1993	29 July 1998	53	34	16	3	64.15
Total			723	337	189	197	46.61

== Honours ==
=== As a player ===
Saint-Étienne

- Division 1: 1963–64, 1966–67, 1967–68, 1968–69, 1969–70
- Division 2: 1962–63
- Trophée des Champions: 1967, 1968, 1969
- Coupe de France: 1967–68, 1969–70

=== As a manager ===
Bordeaux

- Division 1: 1983–84, 1984–85, 1986–87
- Coupe de France: 1985–86, 1986–87
- Trophée des Champions: 1986

France

- FIFA World Cup: 1998

Individual

- French Manager of the Year: 1981, 1984, 1998
- French Manager of the Century
- IFFHS World's Best National Coach: 1998
- Onze d'Or Coach of the Year: 1998

=== Orders ===
- Knight of the Legion of Honour: 1998
- Officer of the Legion of Honour: 2006
