= Rachid Mekhloufi =

Footballer and coach (1936–2024)

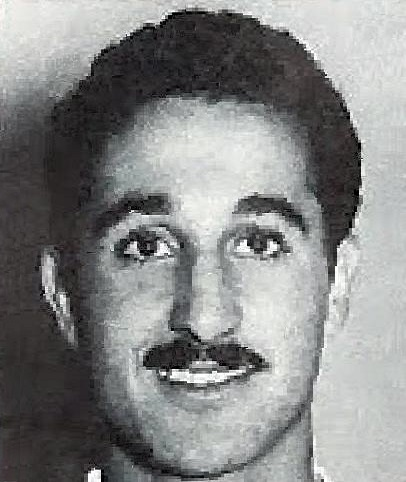
- Mekhloufi in 1950s

Personal information
- Date of birth: 12 August 1936
- Place of birth: Sétif, French Algeria
- Date of death: 8 November 2024 (aged 88)
- Place of death: Algiers, Algeria
- Height: 1.68 m (5 ft 6 in)
- Position: Striker

Youth career
- –1954: USM Sétif

Senior career*
Years	Team	Apps	(Gls)
1954–1958	Saint-Étienne	102	(59)
1962–1963	Servette	19	(13)
1963–1968	Saint-Étienne	192	(78)
1968–1970	Bastia	67	(20)
Total		380	(170)

International career
1956–1957	France	4	(0)
1958–1962	FLN	40	(43)
1963–1969	Algeria	10	(5)

Managerial career
- 1969–1970: Bastia
- 1971–1972: Algeria
- 1975–1979: Algeria
- 1981–1982: AS Marsa
- 1992–1993: AS Marsa
- 1996–1998: Nejmeh
- * Club domestic league appearances and goals

Rachid Mekhloufi (12 August 1936 – 8 November 2024) was a football player and coach. Born in Algeria, Mekhloufi played as a striker for the France, FLN, and Algeria national teams.

== International career ==
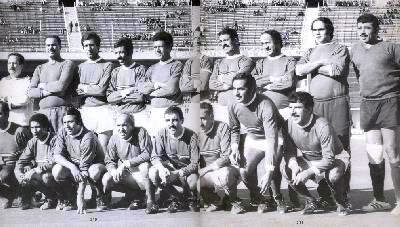
Mekhloufi (bottom row, second from right) with FLN football team.

On 13 April 1958, during the Algerian War, Mekhloufi was among ten France-based Algerian professional footballers who secretly left France to join the FLN football team, which had been established by the National Liberation Front. At the time, he was considered one of France's most promising players and was a member of the provisional squad preparing for the 1958 FIFA World Cup. His departure brought significant attention to the FLN team and its cause. By joining the FLN team, Mekhloufi spent several years outside FIFA-recognized competition, later stating that the experience had affected his competitive edge. Despite French efforts to prevent the team's international activities through FIFA, the FLN team continued to play matches in a number of countries.

== Death ==
On 8 November 2024, it was announced that Mekhloufi had died at the age of 88.

== Career statistics ==
=== Club ===
Appearances and goals by club, season and competition
Club	Season	League			Cup (Note: Includes the Coupe de France, Coupe Charles Drago and Swiss Cup.)		Continental		Other		Total	
Club	Season	Division	Apps	Goals	Apps	Goals	Apps	Goals	Apps	Goals	Apps	Goals
Saint-Étienne	1954–55	Division 1	16	9	6	4	—		—		22	13
Saint-Étienne	1955–56	Division 1	31	21	4	0	—		—		35	21
Saint-Étienne	1956–57	Division 1	30	25	2	1	—		—		32	26
Saint-Étienne	1957–58	Division 1	25	4	2	0	2 (Note: Appearance(s) in European Champion Clubs' Cup)	1	—		29	5
Saint-Étienne	Total		102	59	14	5	2	1	—		118	65
Servette	1962–63	Nationalliga A	19	13	0	0	3	2	—		22	15
Saint-Étienne	1963–64	Division 1	34	16	1	0	—		—		35	16
Saint-Étienne	1964–65	Division 1	32	8	5	0	2	1	—		39	9
Saint-Étienne	1965–66	Division 1	38	21	1	1	—		—		39	22
Saint-Étienne	1966–67	Division 1	38	12	2	1	—		1 (Note: Appearance in Challenge des champions)	1	41	14
Saint-Étienne	1967–68	Division 1	30	7	5	5	4	0	—		39	12
Saint-Étienne	Total		192	78	18	7	6	1	1	1	217	87
Bastia	1968–69	Division 1	33	13	1	0	—		—		34	13
Bastia	1969–70	Division 1	34	7	9	2	—		—		43	9
Bastia	Total		67	20	10	2	—		—		77	22
Career total			380	170	42	14	11	4	1	1	434	189

=== International ===
Scores and results list Algeria's goal tally first, score column indicates score after each Mekhloufi goal.

List of international goals scored by Rachid Mekhloufi
No.	Date	Venue	Opponent	Score	Result	Competition
1	28 February 1963	19 Juin 1965, Oran, Algeria	Czechoslovakia	2–0	4–0	Friendly
1	28 February 1963	19 Juin 1965, Oran, Algeria	Czechoslovakia	3–0	4–0	Friendly
2	5 July 1963	Stade d'El Anasser, Algiers	Egypt	1–1	1–1	Friendly
3	7 July 1963	19 Juin 1965, Oran, Algeria	Egypt	1–1	2–2	Friendly
6	22 March 1963	Alexandria Stadium, Alexandria, Egypt	Egypt	1–2	2–2	Friendly

== Honours ==
=== Player ===
Saint-Étienne

- French Division 1: 1956–57, 1963–64, 1966–67, 1967–68
- Coupe de France: 1968
- Trophée des Champions: 1957, 1967
- Coupe Charles Drago: 1955, 1958

France military

- Military World Cup: 1957

Individual

- All-time AS Saint-Étienne top scorer: 192 goals
- IFFHS All Time Algeria Men's Dream Team

=== Manager ===
Algeria

- Mediterranean Games gold medal: 1975
- All-Africa Games gold medal: 1978

Individual

- Lebanese Premier League Best Coach: 1996–97
