= Emilio Salaber =

Spanish footballer (1937–2018)

Personal information
- Date of birth: 16 February 1937
- Place of birth: La Almolda, Spain
- Date of death: 2 October 2018 (aged 81)
- Place of death: Nîmes, France
- Height: 1.68 m (5 ft 6 in)
- Position: Right winger

Youth career
- 1948–1956: Nîmes

Senior career*
Years	Team	Apps	(Gls)
1956–1960	Nîmes	119	(22)
1960–1965	Sedan	126	(26)
1965–1966	RC Paris	15	(0)
1966–1967	Nîmes	17	(9)
1967–1969	Strasbourg	33	(6)
Total		310	(63)

Managerial career
- Beaucaire
- Montfrin
- * Club domestic league appearances and goals

Emilio Salaber (16 February 1937 – 2 October 2018) was a Spanish footballer who played as a right winger.

== Career ==
When Salaber was 10 years old, he and his parents left Spain and fled to Nîmes to escape the country's regime. In 1948, he joined the academy of Nîmes Olympique, where he made his debut in a 1–1 draw with Saint-Étienne in February 1956, aged 19. While at Nîmes, he played in the 1958 Coupe de France final, where Nîmes lost to Stade de Reims.

In December 1960, Salaber joined Sedan in a swap deal involving midfielder Christian Oliver. There, he would win the Coupe de France in the 1960–61 season, against Nîmes. In the 1961–62 European Cup Winners' Cup, he scored against Atlético Madrid in a 4–1 loss at the Estadio Metropolitano. Salaber would also play in both matches of the 1965 Coupe de France final, where Sedan lost in a replay against Stade Rennais.

Following his retirement, he returned to Nîmes, where he worked as a coach. He also coached teams in Beaucaire and Montfrin.

== Death ==
Salaber died in Nîmes on 2 October 2018.

== Career statistics ==
Appearances and goals by club, season and competition
Club	Season	League			Cup (Note: Includes the Coupe de France and the Coupe Charles Drago)		Europe		Other		Total	
Club	Season	Division	Apps	Goals	Apps	Goals	Apps	Goals	Apps	Goals	Apps	Goals
Nîmes	1955–56	Division 1	1	0	—		—		—		1	0
Nîmes	1956–57	Division 1	11	2	—		—		—		11	2
Nîmes	1957–58	Division 1	34	5	6	1	—		—		40	6
Nîmes	1958–59	Division 1	35	7	4	1	—		1 (Note: Appearance in the Challenge des champions)	0	40	8
Nîmes	1959–60	Division 1	33	8	3	4	—		—		36	12
Nîmes	1960–61	Division 1	5	0	—		—		—		5	0
Nîmes	Total		119	22	13	6	—		1	0	133	28
Sedan
Sedan	1960–61	Division 1	10	2	5	1	—		—		15	3
Sedan	1961–62	Division 1	32	7	6	1	1 (Note: Appearance in the European Cup Winners' Cup)	1	—		39	9
Sedan	1962–63	Division 1	24	7	3	1	—		—		27	8
Sedan	1963–64	Division 1	28	5	3	2	—		—		31	7
Sedan	1964–65	Division 1	32	5	5	1	—		—		37	6
Sedan	Total		126	26	22	6	1	1	—		149	33
RC Paris	1965–66	Division 2	15	0	2	0	—		—		17	0
Nîmes	1966–67	Division 1	17	9	—		—		4 (Note: Appearances in the promotion/relegation play-offs)	0	21	0
Strasbourg	1967–68	Division 1	13	4	2	0	—		4	0	19	4
Strasbourg	1968–69	Division 1	20	2	5	2	—		—		25	4
Strasbourg	Total		33	6	7	2	—		4	0	40	8
Career total			310	63	44	14	1	1	9	0	364	78

== Honours ==
Nîmes

- Coupe de France runner-up: 1957–58
- Challenge des champions runner-up: 1958

Sedan

- Coupe de France: 1960–61; runner-up: 1964–65
- Coupe Charles Drago runner-up: 1963
