= 1964–65 French Division 1 =

27th season of French Division 1

Division Nationale
- Season: 1964–65

FC Nantes won Division 1 season 1964/1965 of the French Association Football League with 43 points.

== Participating teams ==
- Angers SCO
- Bordeaux
- RC Lens
- Lille OSC
- Olympique Lyonnais
- AS Monaco
- FC Nantes
- Nîmes Olympique
- Stade Rennais UC
- FC Rouen
- AS Saint-Étienne
- UA Sedan-Torcy
- FC Sochaux-Montbéliard
- Stade Français FC
- RC Strasbourg
- SC Toulon
- Toulouse FC (1937)
- US Valenciennes-Anzin
Location of teams in 1964–65 Division 1

== Final table ==
Pos	Team	Pld	W	D	L	GF	GA	GD	Pts	Qualification or relegation
1	Nantes (C)	34	16	11	7	66	45	+21	43	Qualification to European Cup preliminary round
2	Bordeaux	34	16	9	9	43	32	+11	41	Invited to Inter-Cities Fairs Cup
3	Valenciennes	34	14	12	8	52	30	+22	40	
4	Rennes	34	15	8	11	67	48	+19	38	Qualification to Cup Winners' Cup first round (Note: Rennes qualified for 1965–66 European Cup Winners' Cup as winners of the 1964–65 Coupe de France.)
5	Strasbourg	34	13	12	9	56	46	+10	38	Invited to Inter-Cities Fairs Cup
6	Lyon	34	13	10	11	46	50	−4	36	
7	Saint-Étienne	34	13	9	12	48	43	+5	35	
8	Lens	34	12	11	11	55	61	−6	35	
9	Lille	34	10	14	10	57	48	+9	34	
10	Sochaux	34	13	8	13	49	45	+4	34	
11	Toulouse	34	12	9	13	50	52	−2	33	
12	Monaco	34	13	7	14	41	45	−4	33	
13	Angers	34	12	7	15	44	51	−7	31	
14	Sedan	34	11	8	15	51	58	−7	30	
15	Stade Français	34	9	12	13	40	52	−12	30	Invited to Inter-Cities Fairs Cup
16	Rouen (O)	34	12	6	16	31	48	−17	30	Qualification to relegation play-offs
17	Nîmes (O)	34	13	3	18	42	58	−16	29	Qualification to relegation play-offs
18	Toulon (R)	34	9	4	21	31	57	−26	22	Relegation to French Division 2

Rules for classification: Victory: 2 points, Draw: 1 point, Defeat: 0 points
(C) Champions; (O) Play-off winners; (R) Relegated
Notes:

Promoted from Division 2, who will play in 1965–66 French Division 1

- OGC Nice: Champion of Division 2
- Red Star Olympique: runner-up of Division 2
- AS Cannes: Third place

== Results ==
Home \ Away	ANG	BOR	RCL	LIL	OL	ASM	NAN	NMS	REN	ROU	STE	SED	SOC	SFF	RCS	SCT	TOU	VAL
Angers		2–1	3–1	1–1	2–1	0–0	2–2	5–0	1–2	3–0	0–1	3–0	1–0	1–0	0–0	0–0	2–4	2–2
Bordeaux	2–1		0–0	2–0	0–2	2–0	2–2	2–1	1–0	1–2	1–1	5–1	1–0	2–1	1–0	3–0	4–2	1–0
Lens	1–0	3–2		0–1	1–2	2–0	0–3	3–1	1–1	2–2	4–1	3–1	2–3	5–2	0–3	2–1	1–1	3–2
Lille	3–4	3–1	4–0		2–2	3–0	2–2	2–1	3–2	1–0	3–3	3–0	3–0	1–1	1–1	5–0	0–2	1–1
Lyon	5–2	0–0	1–1	1–0		0–1	1–1	0–3	1–0	1–1	0–1	2–0	2–1	4–0	2–1	1–0	2–1	1–0
Monaco	3–1	0–0	2–1	1–1	3–2		4–1	1–1	2–1	1–0	0–2	0–4	2–0	1–0	0–1	1–0	2–1	1–1
Nantes	2–1	2–0	1–1	1–1	3–0	2–1		0–2	2–3	3–0	4–1	2–2	3–0	4–2	3–2	5–1	4–0	1–0
Nîmes	2–1	0–3	2–2	2–1	1–2	1–0	0–3		2–3	2–0	1–0	0–3	3–0	3–0	2–1	0–1	0–4	2–1
Rennes	6–0	1–2	3–3	3–3	3–0	1–0	4–0	4–0		4–0	2–1	3–2	1–1	2–0	1–2	4–1	1–1	3–1
Rouen	0–1	1–0	0–1	2–1	1–1	1–1	1–3	1–0	1–0		0–1	2–0	0–4	1–1	1–3	1–0	3–0	1–1
Saint-Étienne	2–1	0–1	2–2	3–3	6–0	2–0	2–0	1–2	3–1	1–3		1–1	0–0	0–0	1–1	1–0	1–0	0–1
Sedan	1–0	0–1	3–1	0–0	4–1	2–1	2–2	4–2	2–2	0–2	1–0		0–0	0–3	5–2	3–2	6–0	1–3
Sochaux	2–0	4–1	2–3	2–1	2–1	3–0	1–1	1–1	3–0	2–3	3–2	2–2		4–1	0–2	2–0	0–2	3–2
Stade Français	2–0	0–0	0–0	0–0	1–1	3–2	1–1	3–1	2–1	2–0	2–3	1–0	3–3		2–2	3–2	2–0	0–3
Strasbourg	0–1	0–0	3–0	3–2	3–3	3–3	1–1	3–2	2–3	3–0	1–0	2–0	0–0	2–0		0–0	5–3	3–3
Toulon	4–0	2–0	1–3	3–1	1–1	0–6	0–1	1–2	4–1	1–0	1–3	1–0	0–1	2–1	0–0		0–2	1–3
Toulouse FC	1–3	1–1	2–2	1–1	3–2	0–2	3–0	1–0	1–1	0–1	2–2	5–0	1–0	1–1	3–1	0–1		1–0
Valenciennes	0–0	0–0	6–1	3–0	1–1	3–0	2–1	1–0	0–0	3–0	2–0	1–1	1–0	0–0	3–0	1–0	1–1	

Legend: Blue = home team win; Yellow = draw; Red = away team win.

== Relegation play-offs ==
Pos	Team	Pld	W	D	L	GF	GA	GD	Pts	Qualification	ROU	NMS	BOU	LIM
1	Rouen	4	2	1	1	12	4	+8	5	Qualification to French Division 1	—		6–0	3–0
2	Nîmes	4	2	0	2	5	4	+1	4	Qualification to French Division 1		—	3–1	1–2
3	Boulogne	4	2	0	2	4	10	−6	4	Qualification to French Division 2	2–1	1–0	—	
4	Limoges	4	1	1	2	4	7	−3	3	Qualification to French Division 2	2–2	0–1		—

Rules for classification: 1) points; 2) goal difference; 3) number of goals scored.
Victory: 2 points, Draw: 1 point, Defeat: 0 points

== Top goalscorers ==
Rank	Player	Club	Goals
1	(France) Jacques Simon	Nantes	24
2	(France) Daniel Rodighiéro	Rennes	20
3	(France) André Perrin	Sedan	18
4	(France) André Guy	Saint-Étienne	17
5	(Argentina) José Farías	Strasbourg	16
5	(France) Serge Masnaghetti	Valenciennes	16
7	(Algeria) Ahmed Oudjani	Lens	15
7	(France) Jean-Michel Lachot	Lille	15
7	(France) Pierre Dorsini	Toulouse FC	15
7	(France) Paul Sauvage	Valenciennes	15

== Attendances ==
#	Club	Average
1	Nantes	12,793
2	Girondins	11,936
3	Stade rennais	11,224
4	Strasbourg	11,200
5	Stade français	10,548
6	LOSC	9,746
7	Saint-Étienne	9,428
8	Rouen	9,355
9	Lens	9,164
10	Toulon	8,529
11	Nîmes	8,300
12	Toulouse	8,173
13	Valenciennes	8,100
14	Olympique lyonnais	7,200
15	Sochaux	6,524
16	Angers	6,100
17	Sedan	5,100
18	Monaco	2,600
