= Yvan Roy (footballer) =

French footballer (born 1944)

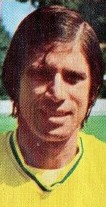
- Roy with Sochaux in 1975

Personal information
- Date of birth: 26 February 1944 (age 82)
- Place of birth: Caen, France
- Height: 1.70 m (5 ft 7 in)
- Position: Forward

Youth career
- Caen

Senior career*
Years	Team	Apps	(Gls)
1962–1967	RC Paris-Sedan (Note: In 1965, UA Sedan-Torcy merged with RC Paris to form RC Paris-Sedan. In 1969, the club was renamed to CS Sedan Ardennes.)	128	(32)
1967–1972	Angers	159	(53)
1972–1975	Strasbourg	78	(17)
1975–1976	Sochaux	9	(1)
Total		374	(103)

International career
1963	France Amateurs	2	(0)
1963–1965	France Military	8	(0)
1963–1966	France U21	6	(0)
1967	France B	2	(2)

Managerial career
- 1978–1980: Sedan
- * Club domestic league appearances and goals

Yvan Roy (born 26 February 1944) is a French former professional football player and manager. As a player, he was a forward (left winger).

== Honours ==
Sedan

- Coupe de France runner-up: 1964–65
- Coupe Charles Drago runner-up: 1962–63

Angers

- Division 2: 1968–69

France Military

- World Military Cup: 1964
