= 1964–65 Coupe de France =

Tournament details
- Country: France

The 1964–65 Coupe de France was its 48th edition. It was won by Stade Rennais which defeated UA Sedan-Torcy in the Final.

== Round of 16 ==
Team 1	Score	Team 2
OGC Nice (D2)	2–2 (a.e.t.)	Toulouse FC (D1)
Stade Français (D1)	3–1 (a.e.t.)	FC Nantes (D1)
Stade Rennais (D1)	10–0	Olympique Saint-Quentin (DH)
SC Toulon (D1)	2–1	Stade de Reims (D2)
AS Saint-Étienne (D1)	1–0	FC Rouen (D1)
UA Sedan-Torcy (D1)	2–1	FC Sochaux-Montbéliard (D1)
RC Strasbourg (D1)	1–0	S.S.M.C. de Miramas (CFA)
US Valenciennes (D1)	0–0 (a.e.t.)	AS Cherbourg (D2)
Replay
OGC Nice (D2)	1–0	Toulouse FC (D1)
US Valenciennes (D1)	3–0	AS Cherbourg (D2)

== Quarter-finals ==
Team 1	Score	Team 2
Stade Français (D1)	2–1	RC Strasbourg (D1)
Stade Rennais (D1)	5–2	OGC Nice (D2)
AS Saint-Étienne (D1)	3–2	US Valenciennes (D1)
UA Sedan-Torcy (D1)	3–1	SC Toulon (D1)

== Semi-finals ==
30 April 1965

Stade Rennais (1)	3–0	AS Saint-Étienne (1)
Pellegrini 15', 31'; Dubaële 25'	(Report)

2 May 1965

UA Sedan-Torcy (1)	4–3	Stade Français (1)
Di Salvio 27'; Cardoni 32'; Perrin 38'; Salaber 65'	(Report)	Pottier 11', 84'; Peyroche 80'

== Final ==
23 May 1965

Rennes	2–2 (a.e.t.)	Sedan
Ascencio 44'; Rodighiero 61'		Marie 11'; Perrin 15'

Parc des Princes, Paris
Attendance: 36,789
Referee: Michel Kitabdjian

=== Replay ===
26 May 1965

Rennes	3–1	Sedan
Rodighiero 47', 86'; Loncle 77'		Herbet 20' (pen.)

Parc des Princes, Paris
Attendance: 26,792
Referee: Michel Kitabdjian
