= 1965–66 French Division 1 =

28th season of French Division 1

Division Nationale
- Season: 1965–66
- Dates: 21 August 1965 – 12 June 1966
- Champions: Nantes (2nd title)
- Relegated: Cannes; Red Star
- European Cup: Nantes
- Cup Winners' Cup: Strasbourg
- Inter-Cities Fairs Cup: Bordeaux; Toulouse FC; Nice
- Matches: 380
- Goals: 1,190 (3.13 per match)
- Top goalscorer: Philippe Gondet (36 goals)

FC Nantes won Division 1 season 1965/1966 of the French Association Football League with 60 points.

== Participating teams ==
- Angers SCO
- Bordeaux
- AS Cannes
- RC Lens
- Lille OSC
- Olympique Lyonnais
- AS Monaco
- FC Nantes
- OGC Nice
- Nîmes Olympique
- Red Star Olympique
- Stade Rennais UC
- FC Rouen
- AS Saint-Etienne
- UA Sedan-Torcy
- FC Sochaux-Montbéliard
- Stade de Paris FC
- RC Strasbourg
- Toulouse FC (1937)
- US Valenciennes-Anzin
Location of teams in 1965–66 Division 1

== League table ==
Pos	Team	Pld	W	D	L	GF	GA	GD	Pts	Qualification or relegation
1	Nantes (C)	38	26	8	4	84	36	+48	60	Qualification to European Cup first round
2	Bordeaux	38	22	9	7	84	36	+48	53	Invited to Inter-Cities Fairs Cup
3	Valenciennes	38	19	14	5	58	44	+14	52	
4	Toulouse	38	19	8	11	61	46	+15	46	Invited to Inter-Cities Fairs Cup
5	Saint-Étienne	38	19	7	12	85	62	+23	45	
6	Rennes	38	18	6	14	80	70	+10	42	
7	Sochaux	38	15	9	14	61	56	+5	39	
8	Strasbourg	38	13	12	13	59	47	+12	38	Qualification to Cup Winners' Cup first round (Note: Strasbourg qualified for 1966–67 European Cup Winners' Cup as winners of the 1965–66 Coupe de France.)
9	Sedan	38	13	12	13	68	58	+10	38	
10	Nice	38	16	4	18	66	59	+7	36	Invited to Inter-Cities Fairs Cup
11	Angers	38	13	10	15	68	66	+2	36	
12	Lens	38	13	10	15	55	57	−2	36	
13	Monaco	38	13	9	16	48	54	−6	35	
14	Rouen	38	10	14	14	41	62	−21	34	
15	Stade Français	38	10	13	15	45	57	−12	33	
16	Lyon	38	12	9	17	43	56	−13	33	
17	Nîmes (O)	38	12	9	17	52	67	−15	33	Qualification to relegation play-offs
18	Lille (O)	38	12	6	20	51	71	−20	30	Qualification to relegation play-offs
19	Cannes (R)	38	6	9	23	37	86	−49	21	Relegation to French Division 2
20	Red Star (R)	38	5	10	23	44	100	−56	20	Relegation to French Division 2

Rules for classification: 1) points; 2) goal difference; 3) number of goals scored.
Victory: 2 points, Draw: 1 point, Defeat: 0 points
(C) Champions; (O) Play-off winners; (R) Relegated
Notes:

Promoted from Division 2, who will play in Division 1 season 1966/1967

- Stade de Reims: Champion of Division 2
- Olympique de Marseille: runner-up of Division 2

Merger at the end of the season

- UA Sedan-Torcy with RC Paris, become RC Paris-Sedan

== Results ==
Home \ Away	ANG	BOR	CAN	RCL	LIL	OL	ASM	NAN	NIC	NMS	RS	REN	ROU	STE	SED	SOC	SFF	RCS	TOU	VAL
Angers		0–0	4–1	3–2	3–1	4–1	1–1	1–1	1–0	3–0	2–2	5–3	6–0	1–1	2–0	2–2	0–0	0–3	2–0	0–1
Bordeaux	2–0		1–0	2–1	1–0	2–2	5–0	1–2	0–2	5–2	6–0	2–1	4–1	4–0	4–2	4–2	10–0	4–0	3–0	2–0
Cannes	2–5	2–1		1–1	2–0	0–0	0–3	1–6	1–3	1–2	1–1	1–0	1–2	2–8	2–1	1–1	0–4	2–1	5–3	0–1
Lens	2–2	0–1	1–0		2–0	2–1	0–0	1–1	4–2	1–1	3–0	4–1	0–0	2–1	1–1	0–1	1–0	0–0	0–1	1–1
Lille	1–0	0–0	2–0	1–1		1–0	2–1	0–1	2–1	1–2	3–0	1–3	2–1	3–0	1–1	2–1	3–3	2–1	1–0	6–1
Lyon	2–1	1–4	2–0	3–2	6–3		1–0	0–2	2–0	3–1	0–0	1–2	0–0	1–1	2–1	1–0	2–0	2–0	0–1	0–1
Monaco	1–3	0–2	0–0	3–0	2–0	2–0		1–3	0–3	4–0	2–1	1–1	3–0	1–1	3–3	1–1	3–1	0–0	2–3	0–2
Nantes	5–3	2–2	1–0	4–2	3–1	2–0	2–1		2–1	4–1	7–2	4–0	2–1	5–0	4–2	2–1	2–1	2–0	2–0	1–1
Nice	5–2	1–2	1–1	0–3	2–0	4–2	1–2	0–0		4–1	4–0	3–2	6–0	4–2	1–0	3–1	1–1	0–2	2–1	1–1
Nîmes	1–0	1–1	1–1	4–5	4–1	0–0	4–0	1–2	1–0		3–1	2–2	2–1	1–1	1–0	1–0	0–0	4–1	2–0	2–2
Red Star	0–2	2–0	3–2	1–2	6–4	2–2	2–0	0–3	2–3	3–3		0–2	0–1	1–5	3–3	1–1	1–5	2–2	1–1	2–0
Rennes	4–4	2–0	2–2	4–1	4–0	5–2	0–1	2–0	3–0	3–1	2–1		4–0	2–0	4–2	4–3	4–3	2–1	2–1	1–1
Rouen	4–0	0–0	1–0	1–3	1–1	0–0	1–2	0–0	1–0	1–0	1–0	2–2		2–0	3–1	1–1	2–1	0–0	0–1	1–3
Saint-Étienne	4–0	2–1	1–1	2–0	7–4	2–1	1–3	0–3	5–1	2–1	7–0	4–0	2–2		2–1	3–1	0–0	5–1	3–0	5–1
Sedan	3–1	1–1	3–1	1–3	1–0	2–0	0–2	3–0	2–0	2–0	5–2	3–1	4–4	4–1		3–0	0–0	0–0	0–1	2–2
Sochaux	3–2	0–1	3–1	3–2	1–0	7–2	2–1	3–1	1–0	3–1	3–0	3–2	4–0	2–3	0–1		1–0	2–1	0–1	1–1
Stade Français	2–1	2–4	3–1	3–1	1–1	0–1	1–0	0–1	2–1	2–1	1–1	2–1	0–0	1–2	1–1	1–1		0–2	2–0	1–1
Strasbourg	1–1	3–0	5–0	1–0	4–1	0–0	1–1	1–0	1–3	1–0	7–1	3–1	0–0	0–1	3–3	5–1	4–0		2–2	0–0
Toulouse FC	1–0	0–0	6–1	4–1	2–0	1–0	5–1	0–0	2–1	3–0	1–0	4–1	6–5	2–0	2–2	1–1	1–1	2–0		1–2
Valenciennes	4–1	2–2	3–0	2–0	2–0	1–0	1–0	2–2	4–2	3–0	1–0	2–1	1–1	3–1	0–4	0–0	1–0	3–2	1–1	

Legend: Blue = home team win; Yellow = draw; Red = away team win.

== Relegation play-offs ==
Pos	Team	Pld	W	D	L	GF	GA	GD	Pts	Qualification	LIL	NMS	BAS	LIM
1	Lille	4	3	0	1	5	2	+3	6	Qualification to French Division 1	—		1–0	1–0
2	Nîmes	4	2	1	1	10	5	+5	5	Qualification to French Division 1		—	3–2	7–0
3	Bastia	4	2	0	2	7	4	+3	4	Qualification to French Division 2	2–0	3–0	—	
4	Limoges	4	0	1	3	0	11	−11	1	Qualification to French Division 2	0–3	0–0		—

Rules for classification: 1) points; 2) goal difference; 3) number of goals scored.
Victory: 2 points, Draw: 1 point, Defeat: 0 points

== Top goalscorers ==
Rank	Player	Club	Goals
1	(France) Philippe Gondet	Nantes	36
2	(France) Robert Herbin	Saint-Étienne	26
3	(France) André Guy	Lille	22
3	(France) Michel Lafranceschina	Sochaux	22
5	(France) (Argentina) Hector De Bourgoing	Bordeaux	21
5	(Algeria) Rachid Mekloufi	Saint-Étienne	21
7	(France) Daniel Rodighiéro	Rennes	20
8	(France) Laurent Robuschi	Bordeaux	18
9	(France) Lucien Cossou	Monaco	17
9	(France) Georges Lech	Lens	17

== Attendances ==
#	Club	Average attendance
1	Nantes	16,707
2	Girondins	11,227
3	Stade rennais	10,724
4	Nice	9,450
5	Saint-Étienne	9,339
6	Strasbourg	8,900
7	Lens	8,631
8	LOSC	7,784
9	Rouen	7,624
10	Stade français	7,170
11	Valenciennes	7,100
12	Toulouse	7,042
13	Olympique lyonnais	7,020
14	Nîmes	7,000
15	Sedan	6,918
16	Angers	6,300
17	Red Star	6,000
18	Sochaux	5,512
19	Cannes	4,400
20	Monaco	2,700
