= Pierre Tordo =

French football player and manager (1939–2026)

Personal information
- Date of birth: 16 December 1939
- Place of birth: Nice, France
- Date of death: 2 September 2026 (aged 86)
- Height: 1.79 m (5 ft 10 in)
- Position: Goalkeeper

Youth career
- Cavigal Nice
- ASPTT Nice
- 1961–1962: Sedan

Senior career*
Years	Team	Apps	(Gls)
1962–1967	Sedan	147	(0)
1967–1968	AS Béziers	31	(0)
1968–1973	Sedan	159	(0)
Total		243	(0)

Managerial career
- 1974–1975: Sedan
- 1975–1980: SO Châtellerault
- 1980–1987: Sedan
- 1988–1992: FC Arlon
- 1992–2000: RJ Arlon
- 2000–2008: US Bazeilles
- * Club domestic league appearances and goals

Pierre Tordo (French: [pjˈɛʁ tɔʁdˈo]; 16 December 1939 – 2 September 2026) was a French football player and manager who played as a goalkeeper.

== Career ==
Born in Nice on 16 December 1939, Tordo played for Cavigal Nice and ASPTT Nice in his youth. He then joined Sedan, where he played the majority of his career. He established himself as starting goalkeeper in 1964, though the squad as a whole was facing financial difficulties. Sedan reached the final of the Coupe de France in 1965, where they were defeated by Rennes. He played a total of 243 Divison 1 matches with Sedan.

After coaching Sedan for one season, Tordo served as the manager for SO Châtellerault from 1975 to 1980, with his best finish being 8th place in Division 3 in 1978. He then returned to Sedan, a tenure during which the club lost its professional status. In 1988, he joined the Belgian club FC Arlon, competing in the Provincial Leagues. He was able to promote the club in his first season, a feat he also accompilished with RJ Arlon in 1999.

== Death ==
Tordo died on 2 September 2026, at the age of 86.
