= Jocelyn Rico =

French footballer (born 1959)

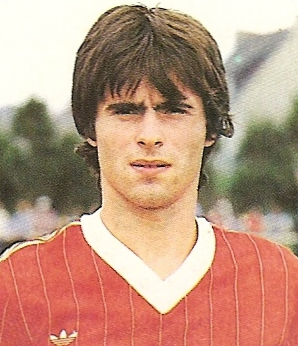
- Rico with Brest in 1983

Personal information
- Date of birth: 17 December 1959 (age 66)
- Place of birth: Concarneau, France
- Height: 1.76 m (5 ft 9 in)
- Positions: Right-back; defensive midfielder

Youth career
- 1966–1977: Concarneau
- 1977–1978: Brest

Senior career*
Years	Team	Apps	(Gls)
1978–1985	Brest	165	(5)
1985–1988	Nice	100	(5)
1988–1989	Paris Saint-Germain	22	(0)
1989–1990	Cannes	14	(0)
1990–1993	Rennes	92	(3)
1993–1994	Concarneau		
1994–2005	US Saint-Grégoire		
- * Club domestic league appearances and goals

Jocelyn Rico (born 17 December 1959) is a French former professional footballer who played as a right-back and defensive midfielder. From 1978 to 1993, he made 383 appearances in the first two tiers of football in France.

== International career ==
Rico was an Olympic international for France. He was called up by the team's manager for a friendly tournament in China in June 1983, but was not chosen for the Summer Olympics in Los Angeles the following year.

== Personal life ==
Born in Concarneau, Brittany, Rico's parents were Pieds-Noirs from Morocco. His brother Robert is also a former professional footballer, and played for the France national team.

Following his retirement from professional football, Rico became a coach. He coached an under-13 side of US Saint-Grégoire while he played for the club's senior team. Rico was employed by the town of Saint-Grégoire as an educator, and coached several other youth teams in the area. He also worked as a sports equipment manager for the town.

== Honours ==
Brest

- Division 2: 1980–81

US Saint-Grégoire

- Coupe de Bretagne: 1998
