= Yves Boutet =

French footballer (1936–2021)

Personal information
- Date of birth: 3 October 1936
- Place of birth: Rennes, France
- Date of death: 15 July 2021 (aged 84)
- Place of death: France
- Height: 1.79 m (5 ft 10 in)
- Position: Central defender

Senior career*
Years	Team	Apps	(Gls)
1955–1967	Rennes		
1967–1970	Lorient		
- * Club domestic league appearances and goals

Yves Boutet (3 October 1936 – 15 July 2021) was a French professional footballer who played as a central defender.

== Career ==
Born in Rennes, Boutet played for Rennes between 1955 and 1967, making 394 appearances and captaining them in the 1965 Coupe de France Final. He later played for Lorient between 1967 and 1970.
