= Louis Cardiet =

French footballer (1943–2020)

- Cardiet with Paris Saint-Germain in 1976

Personal information
- Date of birth: 20 January 1943
- Place of birth: Quimperlé, France
- Date of death: 28 April 2020 (aged 77)
- Height: 1.74 m (5 ft 9 in)
- Position: Defender

Youth career
- –1962: Lorient
- 1962–1963: Rennes

Senior career*
Years	Team	Apps	(Gls)
1963–1973	Rennes	284	(3)
1973–1976	Paris Saint-Germain	66	(1)
1976–1978	Berné		
Total		350+	(4+)

International career
1965–1967	France	6	(0)
- * Club domestic league appearances and goals

Louis Cardiet (French: [lwi kaʁdje]; 20 January 1943 – 28 April 2020) was a French professional footballer who played as a defender.

== After football ==
After his football career, Cardiet became a trader in the fish trade of his hometown Quimperlé.

== Honours ==
Rennes

- Coupe de France: 1964–65, 1970–71
- Challenge des Champions: 1971 (Note: No winner was declared. The title was shared between Rennes and Marseille.)
