= André Ascencio =

Finnish footballer (born 1958)

Personal information
- Full name: André Jean Ascencio
- Date of birth: 4 June 1938
- Place of birth: Oran, French Algeria
- Date of death: 23 September 2017 (aged 79)
- Place of death: Cesson-Sévigné, France
- Height: 1.69 m (5 ft 6 1/2 in)
- Position: Midfielder

Youth career
- FC Oran

Senior career*
Years	Team	Apps	(Gls)
1957–1967	Stade Rennais	216	(22)
1967–1969	Lorient		
- * Club domestic league appearances and goals

André Jean Ascencio (4 June 1938 – 24 September 2017) was a French footballer who played as a midfielder.

== Early life and career ==
Born in the French Algerian city of Oran, Ascencio was a pied-noir. He originally started his career as a striker for FC Oran, before joining Stade Rennais in 1957.

He made his debut for Rennes on 16 February 1958, in a 4–1 win against Montpellier in the 1957–58 French Division 2, while his Division 1 debut came in a 4–4 draw with Lille on 17 August 1958. While at Rennes, he shifted to playing as a midfielder. He scored Rennes' first goal in the 1965 Coupe de France final, and helped to set up the second goal, as the match ended 2–2 and forced a replay three days later. In total, Ascencio made 250 appearances for Rennes, scoring 26 goals.

In 1965, Ascencio was called up to the France national team to play in a friendly match against former French players from the 1958 FIFA World Cup squad.

In 1967, he joined FC Lorient, who had just been elected to the French Division 2. He spent two seasons at the club, before retiring in 1969, at the age of 31.

== Personal life and death ==
Following his retirement, he settled in Rennes and became an insurance agent. In 2001, Ouest-France chose Ascencio as part of their Stade Rennais team of the century, to celebrate the club's centenary.

Ascencio died in Cesson-Sévigné on 23 September 2017, at the age of 79. He was laid to rest five days later in Saint-Etienne.

== Honours ==
- Coupe de France: 1964–65
