= Robert Rico =

French footballer (born 1945)

Personal information
- Date of birth: 10 March 1945 (age 81)
- Place of birth: Agadir, Morocco
- Height: 1.69 m (5 ft 7 in)
- Position: Attacking midfielder

Youth career
- –1965: Concarneau

Senior career*
Years	Team	Apps	(Gls)
1964–1965	Rennes B		
1965–1971	Rennes	146	(28)
1971–1973	Reims	66	(12)
1973–1974	Bordeaux	22	(5)
1974–1976	Nancy	20	(2)
1976–1978	Saint-Dié	30	(3)
Total		284+	(50+)

International career
1970	France	1	(0)
- * Club domestic league appearances and goals

Robert Rico (born 10 March 1945) is a French former professional footballer who played as an attacking midfielder. He was capped once for the France national team in 1970.

== Personal life ==
Robert's brother Jocelyn was also a footballer.

== Honours ==
Rennes

- Coupe de France: 1970–71

Nancy

- Division 2: 1974–75
