= Raymond Keruzoré =

French footballer (born 1949)

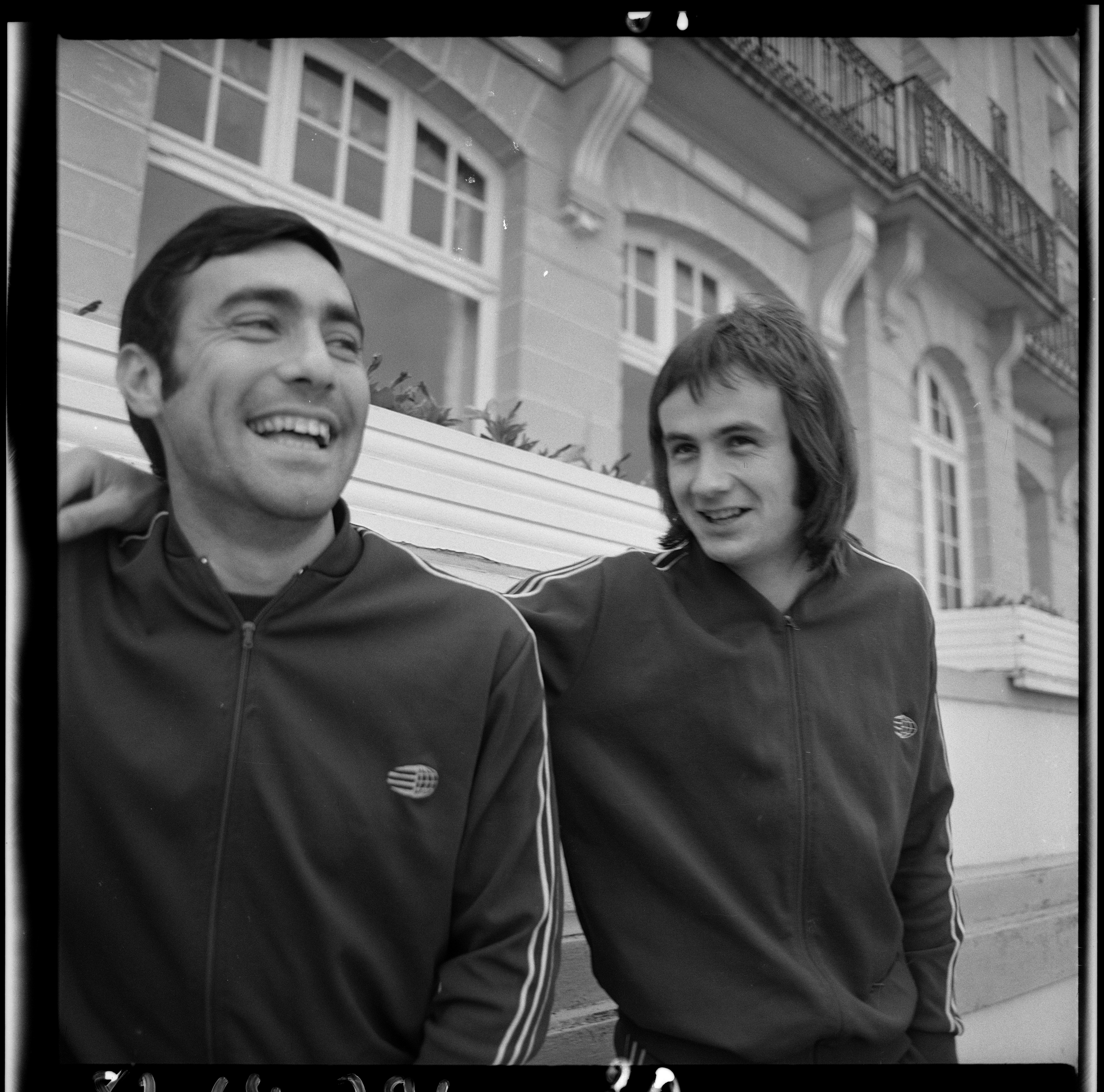

Personal information
- Date of birth: 17 June 1949 (age 77)
- Place of birth: Châteauneuf-du-Faou (Kastell-Nevez-ar-Faou), Brittany, France
- Height: 1.73 m (5 ft 8 in)
- Position: Midfielder

Youth career
- Stade Quimpérois

Senior career*
Years	Team	Apps	(Gls)
1969–1973	Rennes	88	(6)
1973–1974	Marseille	25	(2)
1974–1975	Rennes	19	(0)
1975–1979	Laval	99	(14)
1979–1981	Brest	38	(0)
1981–1984	Guingamp	77	(5)

International career
1976–1978	France	2	(0)

Managerial career
- 1981–1986: Guingamp
- 1986–1987: Brest
- 1987–1991: Rennes
- 1992–1993: Tours
- 1995–1997: Stade Quimpérois
- * Club domestic league appearances and goals

Raymond Keruzoré (born 17 June 1949) is a French former football player and manager, regarded as one of the greatest players to have played for Rennes, as well as one of the greatest ever Breton players.

== Club career ==
Keruzoré was born Châteauneuf-du-Faou, Finistère, Brittany. His professional football career began aged 20 on 26 June 1969, when he played his debut match in Division 1 for Rennes against Metz (3–0). In 1971, he won the Coupe de France with Rennes, beating Lyon 1–0. The following season, he played two matches in the European Cup-Winners Cup, eventually losing to Rangers (1–1 in Rennes, 1–0 in Glasgow).

He signed for Marseille in 1973, but only played one season, returning to Rennes the following year. For Marseille, he played four matches in the UEFA Cup, demolishing Union Luxembourg 13–1 on aggregate in the first round. In the second round the team played against Cologne, winning the first leg 2–0, but conceding six goals in the return match.

In 1975, he joined manager Michel Le Milinaire, a fellow Breton, at Stade Lavallois for one of the club's most successful periods, when it won promotion to the French first division. The club then turned fully professional and against expectations retained its top-flight status until long after his departure in 1979.

From 1979 to 1981 he played for Brest, another Brittany-based club to which he would later return as manager. During this time, the team won Division 2 and was promoted to Division 1.

From 1981 to 1986, he was player-manager of Guingamp, his third Breton club. During this time, the team enjoyed one of their most successful ever periods in Division 2 and in the French Cup. In season 82–83 Guingamp knocked Laval out of the cup (0–0, 0–0, then 4–2 on p.s.o.), before losing to Tours in the quarter-finals. The team was eventually a victim of its own success and the best players left for bigger clubs.

He spent one season as manager of Brest (1986–87) and during this time former manager of Lyon to be, Paul Le Guen, played under him. But a strained relationship with then-president François Yvinec meant he left after only one season, returning to Rennes as manager, his first professional club. Brest were relegated the following season.

As manager of Rennes from 1987 to 1992, 'Kéru' enjoyed mixed fortunes. The club finished 20th in 1992 and survived relegation only due to administrative problems of the top division clubs, Brest and Nice.

Raymond Keruzoré's career in football ended in 1997, after two seasons in Division 2 as manager of Stade Quimperois, the club where he began playing as a youth. The club was declared insolvent and he retired from management. He lives near Rennes in Brittany.

== International career ==
Keruzoré earned eight caps with the France under-21 national team.

While playing for Laval, he won the first of two caps for the France national team in a world cup qualification match against Ireland on 17 November 1976. His second appearances was in a friendly match against Iran on 11 May 1978. 'Kéru' was in contention for the French squad for the 1978 FIFA World Cup in Argentina, but did not make the final squad. This, and his lack of international caps, are largely because he played the same midfield playmaker position as Michel Platini.

== Honours ==
Rennes

- Coupe de France: 1970–71
- Promotion to French Division 1 via play-offs: 1990

Laval

- Promotion to French Division 1 via play-offs: 1975

Brest

- French Division 2: 1981

Individual

- Etoile d'Or (168pts), i.e. Award for most consistent player of the year: 1976–77
- Laval player of the century, voted by fans.
