= Lucien Leduc =

French footballer and manager (1918–2004)

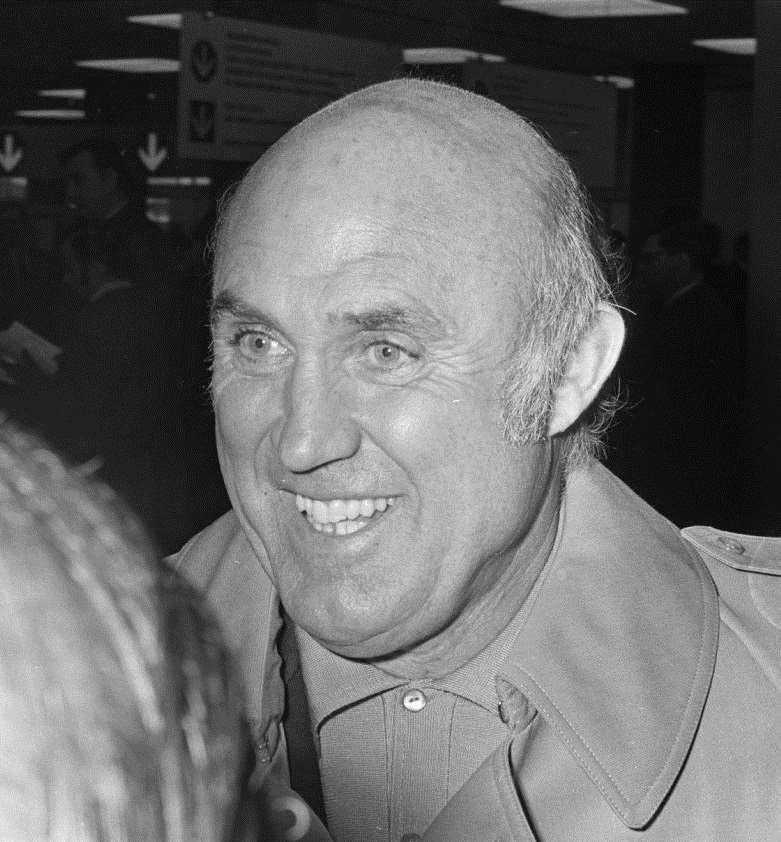
- Leduc in 1971

Personal information
- Full name: Lucien Rémy André Leduc
- Date of birth: 30 December 1918
- Place of birth: Le Portel, Pas-de-Calais, France
- Date of death: 16 July 2004 (aged 85)
- Place of death: Annecy, Haute-Savoie, France
- Position: Midfielder

Youth career
- 1930–1937: Stade Portelois

Senior career*
Years	Team	Apps	(Gls)
1937–1939	Boulogne	55	(0)
1939–1940	Montpellier		
1941–1942	FC Sète		
1942–1943	Excelsior Athlétic Club de Roubaix		
1943	Clermont		
1943–1944	Équipe fédérale Paris-Capitale		
1944–1945	Clermont		
1945–1946	Red Star Saint-Ouen	30	(2)
1946–1947	CO Roubaix-Tourcoing	35	(2)
1947–1949	RC Paris	44	(3)
1949–1951	Venezia	45	(2)
1951	Saint-Étienne	11	(0)
1951–1956	FC Annecy		

International career
1946	France	4	(1)

Managerial career
- 1951–1956: FC Annecy
- 1956–1957: Venezia
- 1957–1958: FC Annecy
- 1958–1963: Monaco
- 1963–1966: Servette
- 1966–1969: Algeria
- 1969–1970: Angers
- 1970–1972: Marseille
- 1972–1974: Reims
- 1974–1975: Wydad Casablanca
- 1976: Standard Liège
- 1976–1979: Monaco
- 1983–1984: Paris Saint-Germain
- * Club domestic league appearances and goals

Lucien Rémy André Leduc (30 December 1918 – 16 July 2004) was a French footballer, who played as a midfielder, and a manager.

== Honours ==
=== As a player ===
CO Roubaix-Tourcoing

- French championship: 1947

RC Paris

- Coupe de France: 1949

=== As a coach ===
Marseille

- French championship: 1971

Monaco

- French championship: 1961, 1963, 1978
- Division 2: 1977
- Coupe de France: 1960, 1963
- Trophée des Champions: 1961
- Coupe Charles Drago: 1961

Servette

- Swiss Super League runner-up: 1966
- Swiss Cup runner-up: 1965, 1966
