= Musée National du Sport =

Museum in Nice, France

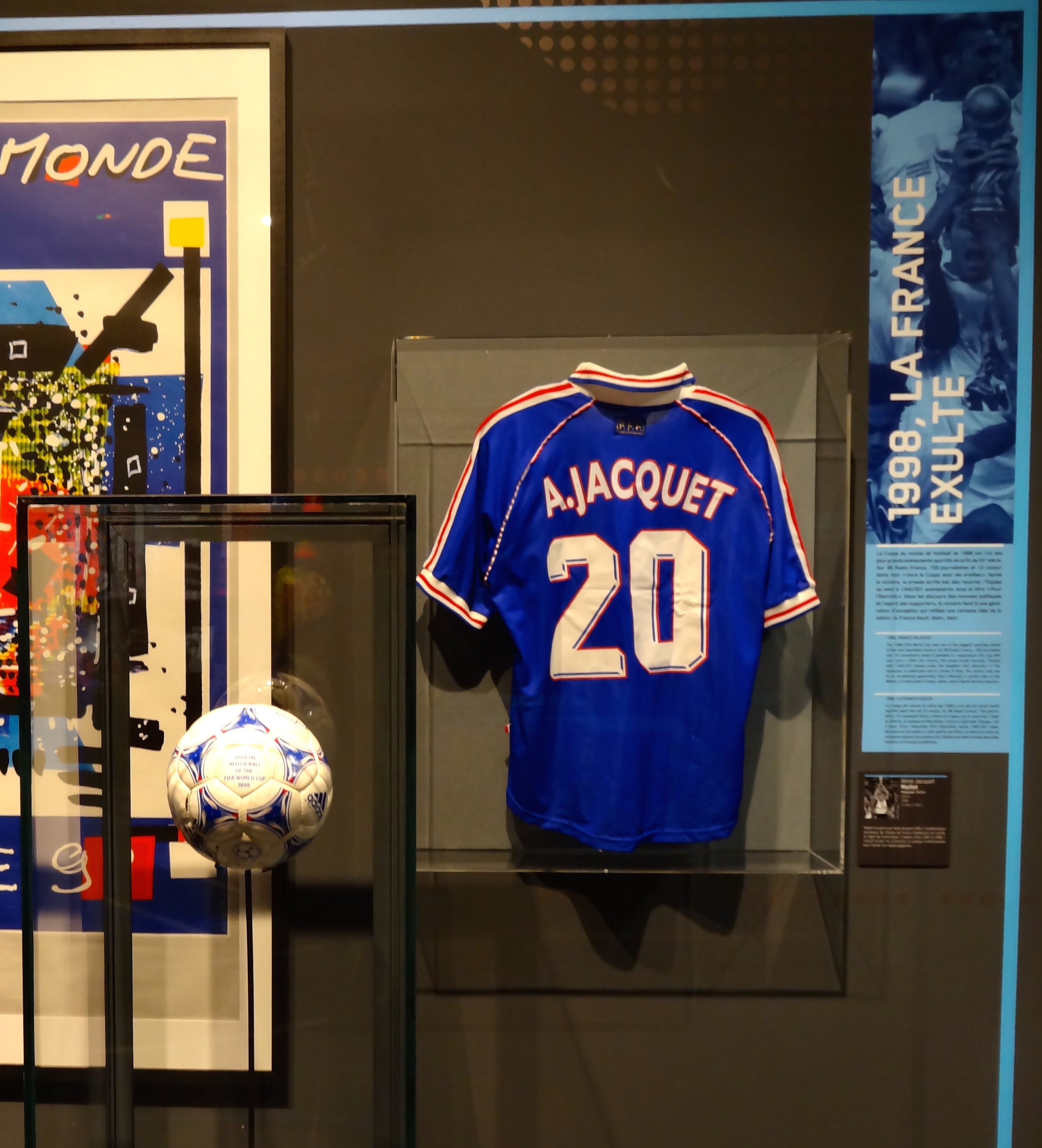
An exhibit on France's 1998 FIFA World Cup victory: a jersey emblazoned with manager Aimé Jacquet's name and the match ball used in the Final.

The Musée national du Sport is a national sports museum located in the Allianz Riviera of Nice, France.

The museum was first established in 1922 by the French minister of war, who held responsibility for sports. In the 1940s, the museum fell into desuetude, but was reestablished by the secretary of state for youth and sports in 1963. Architect Roger Taillibert created the galleries inside the Parc des Princes stadium in 1972. The museum moved to 93 Avenue de France in the 13th arrondissement of Paris from 2008 to 2013, until its relocation in Nice on June 27, 2014.

In 2019, journalist Vincent Duluc succeeds senior civil servant Annie Lessieu as president of the museum. The steering committee, reporting to the president, is the scientific body. It issues opinions on cultural orientations and on all activities. It comprises a maximum of twelve members, chosen for their expertise. The general manager is appointed by joint order of the ministers in charge of culture and sports. By decree of January 20, 2021, Marie Grasse is renewed in her functions as general manager of the Museum.

Today, the museum contains more than 100,000 items documenting sports from the 16th century to the present, including a fine collection on the history of the modern Olympic Games from 1896. The collections include sports equipment, paintings, sculptures, posters, drawing, philately, advertising, books, and magazines.

== See also ==
- List of museums in Paris
