= René Cédolin =

French footballer and manager (born 1940)

Personal information
- Date of birth: 13 July 1940 (age 86)
- Place of birth: Mantes-la-Jolie, France
- Position: Defender

Youth career
- Douvres-la-Délivrande
- Caen

Senior career*
Years	Team	Apps	(Gls)
–1959	Caen		
1959–1972	Rennes		

Managerial career
- 1972–1974: Rennes
- 1975–1978: Troyes
- 1978–1981: Guingamp
- 1981: Angers
- 1999: Chamois Niortais
- * Club domestic league appearances and goals

René Cédolin (born 13 July 1940) is a French former football player and manager.

== Playing career ==
Cédolin played as a defender, for Caen and Rennes, where he spent most of his career, winning the Coupe de France twice in 1965 and 1971.

== Coaching career ==
Cédolin began his coaching career with Rennes and also coached Troyes, Guingamp and Angers.
