= Jean-Claude Lavaud =

French footballer

Personal information
- Date of birth: 18 May 1938 (age 88)
- Place of birth: Orléans, France
- Position: Defender

Senior career*
Years	Team	Apps	(Gls)
- Rennes
- Annecy

International career
1967	France	1	(0)

Managerial career
- 1971–1972: Niort
- 1972–1973: Annecy
- * Club domestic league appearances and goals

Jean-Claude Lavaud (18 May 1938 – 2011) was a French footballer who played for Rennes, Annecy, and France.
