= Jean-Pierre Brucato =

French footballer (1944-1998)

Personal information
- Date of birth: 7 April 1944
- Place of birth: Créteil, France
- Date of death: 1998
- Place of death: Rennes
- Height: 1.69 m (5 ft 7 in)
- Position: Defender

Senior career*
Years	Team	Apps	(Gls)
1960–1962	Racing Paris		
1962–1967	Rennes		
1967–1970	AC Ajaccio		
1970–1976	Stade Reims	221	(1)
1976–1979	Angers SCO		
1979–1980	Thouars Foot 79		

Managerial career
- 1982–1985: Stade Briochin
- 1996–1997: Olympique Alès
- * Club domestic league appearances and goals

Jean-Pierre Brucato (7 April 1944 – 1998) was a French football player who played for Racing Paris, Rennes, AC Ajaccio, Stade Reims, Angers SCO and Thouars Foot 79.

After retiring as a player, Brucato enjoyed a career as a manager with Stade Briochin and Olympique Alès.
