= 1966–67 French Division 2 =

28th season of the second-tier football league in France

Division 2
- Season: 1966–67

Statistics of Division 2 in the 1966–67 season.

== Overview ==
It was contested by 18 teams, and Ajaccio won the championship.

== League standings ==
Pos	Team	Pld	W	D	L	GF	GA	GD	Pts	Promotion or relegation
1	Ajaccio	34	18	10	6	52	26	+26	46	Promoted
2	FC Metz	34	17	10	7	46	26	+20	44	Promoted
3	Bastia	34	19	6	9	48	34	+14	44	
4	Aix-en-Provence	34	15	13	6	59	24	+35	43	Promoted
5	Béziers	34	16	9	9	46	46	0	41	
6	Avignon	34	14	9	11	51	37	+14	37	
7	Toulon	34	15	7	12	45	44	+1	37	
8	Angoulême	34	15	6	13	48	35	+13	36	
9	Cherbourg	34	12	11	11	47	52	−5	35	
10	Grenoble	34	11	11	12	44	38	+6	33	
11	Limoges	34	10	12	12	48	50	−2	32	
12	Besançon	34	12	6	16	43	58	−15	30	
13	US Boulogne	34	10	8	16	39	54	−15	28	
14	Dunkerque	34	11	6	17	38	65	−27	28	
15	Cannes	34	8	11	15	38	56	−18	27	
16	Red Star Paris	34	9	8	17	32	49	−17	26	Merge
17	Montpellier	34	8	8	18	32	46	−14	24	
18	Chaumont	34	8	5	21	39	55	−16	21	

Source: rsssf.com
