= Wolfgang Kaniber =

German footballer (1939–2021)

Personal information
- Date of birth: 22 November 1939
- Place of birth: Würzburg, Germany
- Date of death: 9 April 2021 (aged 81)
- Place of death: Büttelborn, Germany
- Height: 1.86 m (6 ft 1 in)
- Position: Striker

Senior career*
Years	Team	Apps	(Gls)
- Kickers Würzburg
1964–1965	Fortuna Düsseldorf		
1965–1968	TuRa Büderich		
1968–1969	VfL Osnabrück		
1969–1971	Strasbourg	50	(26)
1971–1973	Rüsselheim		
- * Club domestic league appearances and goals

Wolfgang Kaniber (22 November 1939 – 9 April 2021) was a German footballer who played as a striker.
