= 1970–71 Coupe de France =

Tournament details
- Country: France

The Coupe de France's results of the 1970–71 season. Stade Rennais won the final played on 20 June 1971, beating Olympique Lyonnais.

== Round of 32 ==
Team 1	Agg.	Team 2	1st leg	2nd leg
AAJ Blois (D2)	2–1	EDS Montluçon (D2)		
Girondins de Bordeaux (D1)	3–1	AS Aix (D2)	1–1	2–0
USL Dunkerque (D2)	2–1	RC Lens (D2)		
Olympique Lyonnais (D1)	2–1	Cuiseaux-Louhans (D3)		
FC Mantes (D3)	1–0	Stade Quimpérois (D2)		
Rapid de Menton (D3)	3–1	OGC Nice (D1)		
Olympique de Marseille (D1)	1–0	RC Strasbourg (D1)		
AS Monaco (D2)	1–0	Olympique Avignonnais (D2)		
Montpellier HSC (D2)	3–0	Stella Maris (D4)		
AS Nancy (D1)	1–0	FC Rouen (D2)		
FC Nantes (D2)	1–0	US Valenciennes-Anzin (D1)	0–0	1–0
RC Joinville (D2)	1–1 (3–1 p)	SC Saint-Cyr (D4)	0–0	1–1
Stade Rennais (D1)	2–0	Entente BFN (D2)		
AS Saint-Étienne (D1)	2–1	Lille OSC (D1)		
Red Star (D1)	1–0	Stade de Reims (D1)	0–0	1–0
FC Sochaux-Montbéliard (D1)	2–1	AS Strasbourg (D3)		

== Round of 16 ==
Team 1	Agg.	Team 2	1st leg	2nd leg
Girondins de Bordeaux (D1)	3–2	AS Nancy (D1)	2–0	1–2
FC Sochaux-Montbéliard (D1)	3–1	FC Nantes (D1)	2–0	1–1
Olympique de Marseille (D1)	2–0	Red Star (D1)	1–0	1–0
AS Saint-Étienne (D1)	2–3	Olympique Lyonnais (D1)	2–0	0–3
Stade Rennais (D1)	2–1	FC Mantes (D3)	1–0	1–1
Montpellier HSC (D2)	2–5	AS Monaco (D2)	1–4	1–1
RC Joinville (D2)	1–6	AAJ Blois (D2)	0–1	1–5
Rapid de Menton (D3)	2–3	USL Dunkerque (D2)	2–1	0–2

== Quarter-finals ==
Team 1	Agg.	Team 2	1st leg	2nd leg
FC Sochaux-Montbéliard (D1)	3–1	Girondins de Bordeaux (D1)	2–1	1–0
Olympique Lyonnais (D1)	6–3	USL Dunkerque (D2)	3–1	3–2
Olympique de Marseille (D1)	13–3	AAJ Blois (D2)	9–1	4–2
AS Monaco (D2)	2–4	Stade Rennais (D1)	2–0	0–4

== Semi-finals ==
First round

27 May 1971

Olympique de Marseille (1)	1–0	Stade Rennais (1)
Skoblar 23'	(Report)

28 May 1971

FC Sochaux-Montbéliard (1)	0–1	Olympique Lyonnais (1)
	(Report)	Ravier 49'

Second round

1 June 1971

Stade Rennais (1)	2–1 (a.e.t.)	Olympique de Marseille (1)
Guy 44', 64'	(Report)	Loubet 31'
Penalties
Lenoir (penalty scored); Guy (penalty scored); Chlosta (penalty scored); Betta (penalty missed)	3–1	(penalty missed) Skoblar; (penalty scored) Magnusson; (penalty missed) Kula; (penalty missed) Hodoul

8 May 1971

Olympique Lyonnais (1)	1–1	FC Sochaux-Montbéliard (1)
Félix 75'	(Report)	Maier 56'

== Final ==
20 June 1971

Rennes	1–0	Lyon
Guy 63' (pen.)

Stade Olympique Yves-du-Manoir, Colombes
Attendance: 46,801
Referee: René Vigliani
