= Jean Baeza =

French footballer (1942–2011)

Personal information
- Date of birth: 20 August 1942
- Place of birth: Algiers, French Algeria
- Date of death: 21 February 2011 (aged 68)
- Position: Left-back

Youth career
- RU Alger
- RC Paris

Senior career*
Years	Team	Apps	(Gls)
1961–1966	Cannes	59	(1)
1966–1968	Monaco	65	(1)
1968–1969	Red Star	31	(4)
1969–1974	Lyon	192	(12)
1974–1978	Cannes	76	(4)
Total		423	(22)

International career
1967–1969	France	8	(0)
- * Club domestic league appearances and goals

Jean Baeza (20 August 1942 – 21 February 2011) was a French professional footballer who played as a left-back.
