= Jacques Marie (footballer) =

French footballer (1945-1999)

Jacques Marie (12 August 1945 – 1999) was a French footballer.

Marie was born in Caen (Calvados). He was a center and captain of RC Lens with whom he reached the final of the Coupe de France in 1975, ten years after losing in his first final with CS Sedan Ardennes. He retired on 30 Jun 1977.

== Playing career ==
- 1964-1967: UA Sedan-Torcy
- 1967-1968: AS Nancy-Lorraine
- 1973-1977: RC Lens (79 matches in D1, 2 goals)

== Awards ==
- Finalist of the Coupe de France: 1965 and 1975
- Ligue 1: 1977
