= 1966–67 French Division 1 =

29th season of French Division 1

Division Nationale
- Season: 1966–67
- Dates: 18 August 1966 – 11 June 1967
- Champions: Saint-Étienne (3rd title)
- Relegated: Nîmes; Reims; Stade Français
- European Cup: Saint-Étienne
- Cup Winners' Cup: Lyon
- Inter-Cities Fairs Cup: Bordeaux; Nice
- Matches: 380
- Goals: 1,003 (2.64 per match)
- Top goalscorer: Hervé Revelli (31 goals)

AS Saint-Etienne won Division 1 season 1966/1967 of the French Association Football League with 54 points.

== Participating teams ==
- Angers SCO
- Bordeaux
- RC Lens
- Lille OSC
- Olympique Lyonnais
- Olympique de Marseille
- AS Monaco
- FC Nantes
- OGC Nice
- Nîmes Olympique
- Stade de Reims
- Stade Rennais UC
- FC Rouen
- AS Saint-Etienne
- RC Paris-Sedan
- FC Sochaux-Montbéliard
- Stade de Paris FC
- RC Strasbourg
- Toulouse FC (1937)
- US Valenciennes-Anzin
Location of teams in 1966–67 Division 1

== League table ==
Pos	Team	Pld	W	D	L	GF	GA	GD	Pts	Qualification or relegation
1	Saint-Étienne (C)	38	24	6	8	82	37	+45	54	Qualification to European Cup first round
2	Nantes	38	17	16	5	81	51	+30	50	
3	Angers	38	14	16	8	66	46	+20	44	
4	Bordeaux	38	16	11	11	53	43	+10	43	Invited to Inter-Cities Fairs Cup
5	RC Paris-Sedan	38	13	16	9	58	50	+8	42	
6	Nice	38	17	7	14	53	55	−2	41	Invited to Inter-Cities Fairs Cup
7	Valenciennes	38	15	10	13	42	37	+5	40	
8	Lens	38	15	10	13	58	55	+3	40	
9	Marseille	38	13	13	12	44	45	−1	39	
10	Lille	38	15	8	15	48	50	−2	38	
11	Rennes	38	14	9	15	59	56	+3	37	
12	Strasbourg	38	14	8	16	54	52	+2	36	
13	Sochaux	38	11	13	14	43	53	−10	35	
14	Monaco	38	10	14	14	44	44	0	34	
15	Lyon	38	10	14	14	40	56	−16	34	Qualification to Cup Winners' Cup first round (Note: Lyon qualified for 1967–68 European Cup Winners' Cup as winners of the 1966–67 Coupe de France.)
16	Rouen	38	11	11	16	37	44	−7	33	
17	Toulouse (O)	38	10	12	16	40	52	−12	32	Qualification to relegation play-offs, then merged into Red Star
18	Nîmes (R)	38	12	8	18	43	64	−21	32	Qualification to relegation play-offs
19	Reims (R)	38	11	8	19	40	66	−26	30	Relegation to French Division 2
20	Stade Français (R)	38	6	14	18	18	47	−29	26	Relegation to French Division 2

Rules for classification: 1) points; 2) goal difference; 3) number of goals scored.
Victory: 2 points, Draw: 1 point, Defeat: 0 points
(C) Champions; (O) Play-off winners; (R) Relegated
Notes:

Promoted from Division 2, who will play in Division 1 season 1967/1968

- AC Ajaccio: Champion of Division 2
- FC Metz: runner-up of Division 2
- AS Aixoise: 4th place, SEC Bastia (3rd) stay in Division 2

Merger at the end of the season

- Toulouse FC (1937) with Red Star Olympique, become Red Star FC

== Results ==
Home \ Away	ANG	BOR	RCL	LIL	OL	OM	ASM	NAN	NIC	NMS	REI	REN	ROU	STE	RPS	SOC	SFF	RCS	TOU	VAL
Angers		2–0	2–0	2–1	0–2	5–0	0–0	1–1	1–0	1–2	2–2	0–0	5–2	0–3	2–5	1–1	1–1	3–1	1–1	3–1
Bordeaux	1–4		1–1	1–3	4–1	2–0	1–1	0–1	1–1	2–0	1–0	2–0	3–0	1–0	2–5	1–0	0–0	4–1	2–1	0–0
Lens	1–1	3–2		1–1	4–1	2–2	2–1	4–0	1–3	2–1	5–2	2–1	1–1	2–0	2–2	1–1	4–1	2–1	0–0	0–0
Lille	0–0	1–2	2–1		0–1	0–0	2–1	2–4	3–0	4–0	1–1	0–0	1–0	0–1	2–2	6–0	0–0	2–1	3–1	1–0
Lyon	1–1	1–0	0–0	0–1		2–2	1–0	1–2	1–0	3–1	3–1	2–2	1–1	3–0	0–3	0–0	0–0	2–1	1–1	0–0
Marseille	1–1	3–2	1–0	2–1	4–1		1–2	1–0	1–1	4–0	0–0	1–1	0–0	2–2	1–1	1–0	1–2	0–1	2–0	2–1
Monaco	1–5	1–1	2–1	3–0	4–0	0–1		0–0	0–0	0–1	5–0	0–0	0–0	1–0	4–2	3–0	0–1	1–1	1–0	2–2
Nantes	2–1	1–1	3–1	4–0	5–2	3–3	2–1		4–1	5–3	6–2	1–0	0–0	4–1	3–1	1–1	3–0	4–0	2–2	3–1
Nice	3–1	2–1	1–0	1–2	4–3	0–0	0–0	3–1		4–1	1–0	4–0	2–0	1–2	5–1	1–4	0–0	2–1	3–1	5–2
Nîmes	1–4	1–2	1–2	0–0	1–0	0–1	3–2	1–0	1–1		2–2	1–2	1–0	1–1	2–2	3–0	0–1	1–0	2–0	1–2
Reims	0–3	4–1	4–0	0–1	2–0	1–0	2–0	1–1	2–0	1–1		2–4	1–0	1–2	1–4	1–1	1–0	2–1	1–3	1–0
Rennes	2–3	0–1	3–0	1–2	4–0	2–1	3–1	2–2	0–1	3–0	3–0		2–1	1–1	5–0	1–1	2–1	4–3	1–2	1–0
Rouen	1–0	1–1	0–2	3–0	3–2	5–1	0–0	3–3	1–0	2–0	2–0	1–0		0–1	3–0	3–0	0–1	0–0	0–2	1–1
Saint-Étienne	4–2	1–1	4–0	4–1	2–1	2–0	1–3	3–3	7–0	3–1	3–0	4–1	3–0		1–0	1–0	7–1	2–1	3–0	3–1
RC Paris-Sedan	1–1	0–3	3–0	4–1	0–0	0–0	1–1	3–3	0–1	2–2	1–0	4–0	1–0	1–0		1–1	0–0	3–0	1–0	0–0
Sochaux	2–5	1–1	2–5	1–0	1–1	0–1	0–0	1–1	4–0	2–2	1–1	3–1	3–0	0–3	1–0		3–0	1–0	1–0	0–1
Stade Français	1–1	0–0	0–1	0–2	0–1	0–2	1–1	1–0	2–0	1–2	0–1	0–2	1–2	1–1	1–1	0–3		0–0	0–0	0–2
Strasbourg	0–0	0–3	1–0	3–1	0–0	2–1	4–2	1–1	3–1	1–2	5–0	5–3	1–0	2–1	0–0	3–1	1–0		4–0	4–1
Toulouse FC	1–1	2–1	3–2	2–1	2–2	1–0	3–0	2–2	3–0	0–1	1–0	1–1	1–1	0–2	2–3	1–2	0–0	1–1		0–2
Valenciennes	0–0	0–1	1–3	3–0	0–0	2–1	2–0	0–0	0–1	2–0	2–0	3–1	3–0	0–3	0–0	2–0	2–0	1–0	2–0	

Legend: Blue = home team win; Yellow = draw; Red = away team win.

== Relegation play-offs ==
Pos	Team	Pld	W	D	L	GF	GA	GD	Pts	Qualification	AIX	TOU	NMS	BAS
1	Aix-en-Provence	4	1	3	0	7	5	+2	5	Qualification to French Division 1	—	2–0	2–2	
2	Toulouse	4	2	1	1	3	3	0	5	Qualification to French Division 1	1–1	—		1–0
3	Nîmes	4	1	2	1	7	6	+1	4	Qualification to French Division 2	2–2		—	3–1
4	Bastia	4	1	0	3	2	5	−3	2	Qualification to French Division 2		0–1	1–0	—

Rules for classification: 1) points; 2) goal difference; 3) number of goals scored.
Victory: 2 points, Draw: 1 point, Defeat: 0 points

== Top goalscorers ==
Rank	Player	Club	Goals
1	(France) Hervé Revelli	Saint-Étienne	31
2	(France) Georges Lech	Lens	25
3	(France) André Guy	Lille	20
3	(France) Daniel Rodighiéro	Rennes	20
5	(France) Philippe Levavasseur	RC Paris-Sedan	17
6	(France) Michel Margottin	Angers	16
6	(France) Philippe Piat	Monaco	16
6	(France) Jean-Pierre Serra	Nice	16
9	(France) Claude Dubaele	Angers	15
9	(Cameroon) Joseph Yegba Maya	Marseille	15
9	(France) Jean-Pierre Guinot	Valenciennes	15

== Attendances ==
#	Club	Average
1	Nantes	16,747
2	Marseille	14,500
3	Saint-Étienne	13,715
4	Stade rennais	10,241
5	Girondins	9,700
6	Olympique lyonnais	9,284
7	Nice	9,100
8	LOSC	8,739
9	Strasbourg	8,600
10	Stade français	8,539
11	Lens	8,516
12	Reims	8,319
13	Angers	8,150
14	Rouen	7,320
15	Nîmes	6,800
16	Valenciennes	5,600
17	Sochaux	5,494
18	Sedan	5,323
