= Yves Herbet =

French footballer and manager (1945–2024)

Personal information
- Date of birth: 17 August 1945
- Place of birth: Villers-Cotterêts, France
- Date of death: 28 June 2024 (aged 78)
- Place of death: Alès, France
- Height: 1.67 m (5 ft 6 in)
- Position: Midfielder

Youth career
- Sedan

Senior career*
Years	Team	Apps	(Gls)
1963–1968	Sedan		
1968–1969	Anderlecht		
1969–1970	Red Star Saint-Ouen		
1970–1971	Reims		
1971–1974	Nancy	100	(19)
1974–1978	Avignon Football 84		
1978–1980	Martigues		

International career
1965–1971	France	16	(1)

Managerial career
- 1980–1982: Martigues
- 1982–1983: Le Havre
- 1983–1985: FC Sète
- 1985–1988: Martigues
- 1988–1990: Dijon
- 1995–1996: SO Châtellerault
- 1998–1999: Martigues
- 1999–2003: FUS Rabat
- 2003: Bahrain
- 2003–2004: Beaucaire
- 2004: Angers
- 2004–2006: O. Barbentane
- * Club domestic league appearances and goals

Yves Herbet (French: [iv ɛʁbɛ]; 17 August 1945 – 28 June 2024) was a French football player and manager, who played as a midfielder.

Herbet played for France at FIFA World Cup 1966. He died in June 2024, at the age of 78.
