= 1968–69 French Division 1 =

31st season of French Division 1

Division Nationale
- Season: 1968–69
- Dates: 1 September 1968 – 14 June 1969
- Champions: Saint-Étienne (5th title)
- Relegated: Monaco; Nice
- European Cup: Saint-Étienne
- Cup Winners' Cup: Marseille
- Inter-Cities Fairs Cup: Bordeaux; Metz; Rouen
- Matches: 306
- Goals: 816 (2.67 per match)
- Top goalscorer: André Guy (25 goals)

AS Saint-Etienne won Division 1 season 1968/1969 of the French Association Football League with 53 points.

== Participating teams ==
- AC Ajaccio
- SEC Bastia
- Bordeaux
- Olympique Lyonnais
- Olympique de Marseille
- FC Metz
- AS Monaco
- FC Nantes
- OGC Nice
- Nîmes Olympique
- Red Star FC
- Stade Rennais UC
- FC Rouen
- AS Saint-Etienne
- RC Paris-Sedan
- FC Sochaux-Montbéliard
- RC Strasbourg
- US Valenciennes-Anzin
Location of teams in 1968–69 Division 1

== League table ==
Pos	Team	Pld	W	D	L	GF	GA	GD	Pts	Qualification or relegation
1	Saint-Étienne (C)	34	24	5	5	70	26	+44	53	Qualification to European Cup first round
2	Bordeaux	34	22	7	5	77	34	+43	51	Invited to Inter-Cities Fairs Cup
3	Metz	34	16	10	8	41	27	+14	42	Invited to Inter-Cities Fairs Cup
4	Rouen	34	16	8	10	44	43	+1	40	Invited to Inter-Cities Fairs Cup
5	RC Paris-Sedan	34	15	9	10	49	35	+14	39	
6	Bastia	34	13	8	13	50	66	−16	34	
7	Marseille	34	12	9	13	51	48	+3	33	Qualification to Cup Winners' Cup first round (Note: Marseille qualified for 1969–70 European Cup Winners' Cup as winners of the 1968–69 Coupe de France.)
8	Valenciennes	34	10	13	11	38	37	+1	33	
9	Lyon	34	13	6	15	53	51	+2	32	
10	Nantes	34	13	6	15	44	45	−1	32	
11	Rennes	34	12	7	15	50	57	−7	31	
12	Sochaux	34	11	7	16	49	55	−6	29	
13	Strasbourg	34	10	9	15	34	41	−7	29	
14	Nîmes	34	8	13	13	32	39	−7	29	
15	Red Star	34	8	13	13	35	48	−13	29	
16	Ajaccio	34	10	8	16	36	53	−17	28	
17	Monaco (R)	34	7	13	14	33	50	−17	27	Qualification to relegation play-offs
18	Nice (R)	34	6	9	19	30	61	−31	21	Relegation to French Division 2

Rules for classification: 1) points; 2) goal difference; 3) number of goals scored.
Victory: 2 points, Draw: 1 point, Defeat: 0 points
(C) Champions; (R) Relegated
Notes:

Promoted from Division 2, who will play in Division 1 season 1969/1970

- Angers SCO: Champion of Division 2
- AS Angoulême: runner-up of Division 2

== Results ==
Home \ Away	ACA	BAS	BOR	OL	OM	MET	ASM	NAN	NIC	NMS	RS	REN	ROU	STE	RPS	SOC	RCS	VAL
Ajaccio		4–0	2–2	4–1	1–1	0–1	4–3	1–0	1–0	1–0	3–1	2–2	0–1	0–2	2–0	0–2	1–1	1–1
Bastia	1–0		1–0	4–0	3–1	1–1	4–0	3–1	2–0	2–2	2–1	1–2	1–1	1–1	0–0	1–0	2–1	3–0
Bordeaux	5–0	8–1		2–1	2–2	1–0	2–1	1–1	5–0	2–1	6–1	3–2	2–1	2–0	0–2	4–0	3–0	1–0
Lyon	3–2	8–3	0–2		2–3	0–1	2–0	3–1	3–1	1–1	0–0	1–0	0–1	1–2	1–0	6–3	2–3	1–0
Marseille	3–0	1–0	3–3	2–2		0–1	0–1	3–1	3–1	4–0	0–0	3–3	1–0	0–3	4–1	4–0	0–0	1–0
Metz	0–0	2–0	1–0	1–1	3–0		0–0	1–0	1–0	0–0	3–1	3–0	7–3	0–1	0–1	3–0	2–0	1–0
Monaco	3–0	2–0	2–4	0–2	1–0	1–1		2–0	0–0	0–0	1–1	2–2	1–1	1–2	0–0	2–1	2–1	0–0
Nantes	0–0	3–0	1–2	2–1	2–1	1–2	2–0		0–0	3–1	0–1	3–2	0–1	3–0	3–2	0–0	4–0	3–2
Nice	0–3	2–2	2–2	2–1	2–3	1–2	1–0	0–0		3–0	1–1	1–1	2–2	2–3	2–1	0–3	1–0	1–1
Nîmes	3–2	2–1	1–3	1–2	0–0	0–0	1–1	1–2	2–0		0–0	5–1	0–0	1–0	1–0	3–1	0–0	2–2
Red Star	1–0	1–1	1–2	1–2	1–1	1–0	1–0	2–3	0–2	0–2		2–1	4–0	0–0	2–1	2–2	2–1	1–2
Rennes	5–0	3–1	0–1	2–1	2–1	2–0	3–1	2–1	4–2	1–0	1–1		0–1	0–2	1–3	3–2	1–0	1–2
Rouen	1–1	1–3	2–1	2–1	2–1	1–0	3–1	3–0	4–0	1–0	1–1	1–0		1–5	0–1	2–1	3–0	2–2
Saint-Étienne	2–0	7–2	3–2	0–1	1–0	4–0	1–1	3–1	2–0	1–0	3–1	3–1	2–0		4–2	4–1	2–0	4–0
RC Paris-Sedan	4–0	5–1	0–1	1–0	3–1	0–0	2–2	3–1	2–1	3–1	0–0	3–0	1–1	0–0		2–0	1–1	1–0
Sochaux	0–1	2–2	0–1	2–1	3–1	5–2	0–0	1–2	3–0	1–1	3–3	1–1	2–0	1–0	3–1		3–0	2–0
Strasbourg	3–0	4–0	1–1	2–2	1–2	1–1	5–0	1–0	1–0	1–0	1–0	0–0	2–0	0–2	1–2	1–0		0–1
Valenciennes	1–0	0–1	1–1	0–0	3–1	1–1	4–2	0–0	3–0	0–0	3–0	4–1	0–1	1–1	1–1	2–1	1–1	

Legend: Blue = home team win; Yellow = draw; Red = away team win.

== Relegation play-offs ==
Team 1	Agg.	Team 2	1st leg	2nd leg	3rd leg
Angoulême	4–2	Monaco	1–2	1–0	2–0

== Top goalscorers ==
Rank	Player	Club	Goals
1	(France) André Guy	Lyon	25
2	(France) Hervé Revelli	Saint-Étienne	22
3	(Cameroon) Joseph Yegba Maya	Marseille	21
3	(Mali) Salif Keita	Saint-Étienne	21
5	(France) Philippe Levavasseur	Sedan	18
6	(France) Guy Lassalette	Sochaux	15
7	(France) Jean-Pierre Serra	Bastia	14
7	(France) Jacques Simon	Bordeaux	14
9	(France) Étienne Sansonetti	Ajaccio	13
9	(Algeria) Rachid Mekloufi	Bastia	13
9	(France) Didier Couécou	Bordeaux	13
9	(Brazil) Carlos Ruiter	Bordeaux	13
9	(France) Bernard Blanchet	Nantes	13
9	(Socialist Federal Republic of Yugoslavia) Silvester Takač	Rennes	13
9	(Luxembourg) Johny Leonard	Metz	13
9	(France) Dominique Rusticelli	Rouen	13

== Attendances ==
#	Club	Average
1	Marseille	12,917
2	Saint-Étienne	12,477
3	Nantes	10,088
4	Metz	10,018
5	Girondins	9,809
6	Stade rennais	8,905
7	Rouen	8,377
8	Red Star	7,938
9	Olympique lyonnais	7,671
10	Strasbourg	6,822
11	Nîmes	6,379
12	Nice	6,267
13	Valenciennes	5,304
14	Sochaux	4,280
15	Paris-Sedan	3,721
16	Bastia	3,651
17	Ajaccio	2,331
18	Monaco	1,935
