= Daniel Ravier =

French footballer (born 1948)

Personal information
- Date of birth: 17 March 1948 (age 78)
- Place of birth: Lyon, France
- Position: Midfielder

Senior career*
Years	Team	Apps	(Gls)
1969–1974	Lyon		
1974–1977	Reims		
1977–1979	Lyon		
- Villefranche

International career
1973	France	2	(0)
- * Club domestic league appearances and goals

Daniel Ravier (born 17 March 1948) is a French former professional footballer who played as a midfielder.
