= André Betta =

French footballer

Personal information
- Date of birth: 4 March 1944 (age 82)
- Place of birth: Beaune, France
- Height: 1.69 m (5 ft 7 in)
- Position: Midfielder

Youth career
- Cransac

Senior career*
Years	Team	Apps	(Gls)
1961–1963	Roubaix-Tourcoing		
1963–1969	Rouen	144	(27)
1969–1970	Bordeaux	24	(2)
1970–1974	Rennes	131	(17)
1974–1976	Metz	64	(8)
1976–1979	Reims	77	(2)

International career
1968	France	2	(0)
- * Club domestic league appearances and goals

André Betta (born 4 March 1943) is a French former professional footballer who played as a midfielder.

== Club career ==
Betta was born in Beaune, Côte-d'Or. He played for several clubs, most notably Rouen, Rennes, FC Metz and Reims.
