= 1969–70 French Division 1 =

32nd season of French Division 1

Division Nationale
- Season: 1969–70
- Dates: 5 August 1969 – 23 June 1970
- Champions: Saint-Étienne (6th title)
- Relegated: Rouen
- European Cup: Saint-Étienne
- Cup Winners' Cup: Nantes
- Inter-Cities Fairs Cup: Marseille; RC Paris-Sedan; Angoulême
- Matches: 306
- Goals: 973 (3.18 per match)
- Top goalscorer: Hervé Revelli (28 goals)

AS Saint-Etienne won Division 1 season 1969/1970 of the French Association Football League with 56 points.

== Participating teams ==
- AC Ajaccio
- Angers SCO
- AS Angoulême
- SEC Bastia
- Bordeaux
- Olympique Lyonnais
- Olympique de Marseille
- FC Metz
- FC Nantes
- Nîmes Olympique
- Red Star Paris
- Stade Rennais UC
- FC Rouen
- AS Saint-Etienne
- RC Paris-Sedan
- FC Sochaux-Montbéliard
- RC Strasbourg
- US Valenciennes-Anzin
Location of teams in 1969–70 Division 1

== League table ==
Pos	Team	Pld	W	D	L	GF	GA	GD	Pts	Qualification or relegation
1	Saint-Étienne (C)	34	25	6	3	88	30	+58	56	Qualification to European Cup first round
2	Marseille	34	18	9	7	75	41	+34	45	Invited to Inter-Cities Fairs Cup
3	RC Paris-Sedan	34	17	8	9	54	42	+12	42	Invited to Inter-Cities Fairs Cup
4	Angoulême	34	12	14	8	53	43	+10	38	Invited to Inter-Cities Fairs Cup
5	Strasbourg	34	15	6	13	65	55	+10	36	
6	Bordeaux	34	13	10	11	54	48	+6	36	
7	Angers	34	13	9	12	53	53	0	35	
8	Metz	34	13	8	13	50	44	+6	34	
9	Sochaux	34	12	10	12	48	55	−7	34	
10	Nantes	34	13	7	14	62	56	+6	33	Qualification to Cup Winners' Cup first round (Note: Nantes qualified for 1970–71 European Cup Winners' Cup as runners-up of the 1969–70 Coupe de France as cup winners Saint-Étienne also won the league and qualified for the European Cup.)
11	Nîmes	34	13	6	15	60	55	+5	32	
12	Rouen (R)	34	10	12	12	41	45	−4	32	Relegation to French Division 2 (Note: Rouen were relegated to Division 2 because they gave up its professional status.)
13	Red Star	34	11	8	15	45	67	−22	30	
14	Rennes	34	9	11	14	52	73	−21	29	
15	Lyon	34	12	4	18	57	78	−21	28	
16	Ajaccio	34	11	4	19	34	51	−17	26	Qualification to relegation play-offs, then spared from relegation (Note: Ajaccio were originally relegated after relegation play-offs, when was played along with Bastia, and Valenciennes were originally directly relegated, but the clubs were spared from relegation due to expansion of the Division 1 to 20 clubs from the next season.)
17	Bastia (O)	34	10	4	20	50	74	−24	24	Qualification to relegation play-offs
18	Valenciennes	34	8	6	20	32	63	−31	22	Spared from relegation

Rules for classification: 1) points; 2) goal difference; 3) number of goals scored.
Victory: 2 points, Draw: 1 point, Defeat: 0 points
(C) Champions; (O) Play-off winners; (R) Relegated
Notes:

Promoted from Division 2, who will play in Division 1 season 1970/1971

- OGC Nice: Champion of Division 2
- AS Nancy: runner-up of Division 2
- Stade de Reims: 4th place in Division 2, but Olympique Avignonnais (3rd) was not financially strong enough to play in Division 1

== Results ==
Home \ Away	ACA	ANG	ASA	BAS	BOR	OL	OM	MET	NAN	NMS	RS	REN	ROU	STE	RPS	SOC	RCS	VAL
Ajaccio		0–1	0–0	2–0	1–1	2–0	2–4	0–0	2–1	1–0	2–2	4–2	1–0	1–2	0–1	1–0	1–0	3–1
Angers	3–2		2–2	5–0	3–1	3–2	2–1	0–0	0–3	1–0	5–1	1–0	1–1	0–0	1–3	2–2	4–1	0–1
Angoulême	2–1	1–1		5–1	3–2	1–1	1–3	2–1	2–2	1–0	1–1	3–0	1–1	0–1	2–1	4–0	1–1	6–1
Bastia	2–0	3–1	1–1		2–2	2–4	3–2	2–2	3–2	2–5	3–0	4–0	0–2	0–1	2–3	2–0	2–1	3–1
Bordeaux	2–1	1–0	5–1	1–0		3–0	2–2	1–0	3–0	1–0	0–1	1–1	1–1	1–4	4–1	3–0	4–2	0–2
Lyon	2–1	2–1	1–2	2–1	1–3		1–0	2–4	2–5	3–0	2–0	4–4	3–0	1–7	4–2	2–2	0–1	1–0
Marseille	1–0	5–2	1–1	3–3	3–1	4–1		3–2	4–2	4–0	4–0	1–0	2–0	2–3	2–0	0–0	2–0	3–1
Metz	1–0	2–1	3–2	3–0	4–1	4–0	2–1		2–2	3–1	2–1	2–0	2–0	1–2	0–2	1–2	2–2	3–0
Nantes	5–0	1–0	1–1	2–1	1–1	5–2	2–1	1–0		1–0	1–1	6–1	0–2	2–2	2–2	1–2	0–1	1–2
Nîmes	2–0	1–1	2–2	4–1	3–0	5–2	1–1	2–1	4–2		1–3	2–3	6–1	1–3	5–1	2–0	3–2	2–1
Red Star	4–1	3–4	0–0	2–1	1–1	1–5	1–6	3–1	3–0	3–0		2–4	2–0	1–5	0–2	1–0	2–1	1–1
Rennes	0–1	1–0	2–0	3–1	0–0	4–3	1–1	2–0	1–2	1–1	2–2		1–1	1–0	3–3	2–4	4–5	1–1
Rouen	2–0	5–0	0–2	3–0	0–0	1–0	1–1	1–1	1–0	1–1	2–0	4–0		0–2	0–0	1–3	1–1	3–3
Saint-Étienne	3–1	1–2	1–1	4–2	2–0	6–0	2–1	2–0	2–3	2–1	0–0	8–2	5–0		3–1	2–0	3–0	1–0
RC Paris-Sedan	2–0	2–2	2–0	0–2	1–1	1–0	0–0	0–0	4–0	1–0	3–0	3–2	1–0	1–2		3–0	2–1	0–0
Sochaux	0–2	1–1	1–0	2–1	3–2	0–2	2–2	4–1	0–3	2–2	0–3	2–2	1–1	3–3	1–0		2–0	6–1
Strasbourg	2–0	4–1	3–1	4–0	3–1	2–1	2–3	2–0	2–1	4–1	5–0	1–1	3–2	1–1	2–3	2–2		4–2
Valenciennes	2–1	0–2	0–1	2–0	1–4	1–1	0–2	0–0	2–1	0–2	2–0	0–1	1–3	0–3	1–3	0–1	2–0	

Legend: Blue = home team win; Yellow = draw; Red = away team win.

== Relegation play-offs ==
Pos	Team	Pld	W	D	L	GF	GA	GD	Pts	Qualification	BAS	NAN	ACA	OAV
1	Bastia	4	2	1	1	8	5	+3	5	Qualification to French Division 1	—	0–0		4–2
2	Nancy	4	2	1	1	5	4	+1	5	Qualification to French Division 1	2–0	—	3–1	
3	Ajaccio	4	2	0	2	8	5	+3	4	Qualification to French Division 2 (Note: Ajaccio were later reprived due to the expansion of Division 1.)		3–0	—	4–0
4	Avignon	4	1	0	3	5	12	−7	2	Qualification to French Division 2	1–4		2–0	—

Rules for classification: 1) points; 2) goal difference; 3) number of goals scored.
Victory: 2 points, Draw: 1 point, Defeat: 0 points

== Top goalscorers ==
Rank	Player	Club	Goals
1	(France) Hervé Revelli	Saint-Étienne	28
2	(Cameroon) Joseph Yegba Maya	Marseille	24
3	(Mali) Salif Keita	Saint-Étienne	21
4	(France) Philippe Piat	Strasbourg	20
5	(West Germany) Wolfgang Kaniber	Strasbourg	19
5	(Czechoslovakia) Adolf Scherer	Nîmes	19
7	(France) André Guy	Lyon	17
7	(France) Charly Loubet	Marseille	17
7	(France) Bernard Blanchet	Nantes	17
7	(France) Marc Molitor	Strasbourg	17

== Attendances ==
#	Club	Average
1	Marseille	17,451
2	Strasbourg	14,008
3	Saint-Étienne	13,201
4	Nantes	11,853
5	Girondins	8,623
6	Stade rennais	8,241
7	Metz	8,208
8	Olympique lyonnais	7,726
9	Nîmes	7,214
10	Red Star	6,430
11	Rouen	6,083
12	Angers	5,918
13	Angoulême	4,995
14	Paris-Sedan	4,616
15	Sochaux	4,366
16	Valenciennes	3,394
17	Bastia	3,102
18	Ajaccio	2,020
