= Marcel Loncle =

French footballer (1936–2026)

Personal information
- Date of birth: 5 January 1936
- Place of birth: Saint-Malo, France
- Date of death: 22 January 2026 (aged 90)
- Position: Midfielder

Senior career*
Years	Team	Apps	(Gls)
1956–1961	Angers		
1961–1965	Rennes		

International career
1965	France	2	(0)
- * Club domestic league appearances and goals

Marcel Loncle (5 January 1936 – 22 January 2026) was a French footballer who played as a midfielder for Angers and Rennes, as well as the French national side. He was part of France's squad at the 1960 Summer Olympics. Loncle died on 22 January 2026, at the age of 90.
