= Claude Dubaële =

French footballer and coach (born 1940)

Personal information
- Date of birth: 19 January 1940 (age 86)
- Place of birth: Lens, France
- Height: 1.75 m (5 ft 9 in)
- Positions: Midfielder; striker

Youth career
- Rennes

Senior career*
Years	Team	Apps	(Gls)
1957–1964	Reims	45	(19)
1964–1966	Rennes		
1966–1970	Angers		
1971–1972	Lille		
1973–1974	Le Mans		

Managerial career
- 1974–1975: Fossemange
- 1976–1978: Rennes
- 1979–1980: Red Star 93
- * Club domestic league appearances and goals

Claude Dubaële (born 19 January 1940) is a French former professional football player and coach.

== Playing career ==
He played for Stade Reims, Rennes, Angers SCO, Lille OSC and Le Mans. He was also part of France's squad at the 1960 Summer Olympics.

== Coaching career ==
After retiring as a player, Dubaële enjoyed a career as a manager with Fossemange, Rennes and Red Star 93.
