= Auguste Perrin =

French cross-country skier

Personal information
- Full name: Joseph Auguste Perrin
- Nationality: French
- Born: 24 August 1894; Bussang, France
- Died: 26 November 1968 (aged 74); Bruyères, France

Sport
- Sport: Cross-country skiing

Auguste Perrin (born 24 August 1894) was a French cross-country skier. He competed in the men's 50 kilometre event at the 1924 Winter Olympics.
