= Daniel Rodighiéro =

French footballer (born 1940)

Daniel Rodighiero
Personal information
- Date of birth: 20 September 1940 (age 86)
- Place of birth: Saint-Cloud, France
- Position: Striker

Senior career*
Years	Team	Apps	(Gls)
1958–1960	Red Star	3	(0)
1959–1961	Caen		
1961–1964	Red Star	72	(39)
1964–1970	Rennes	201	(98)
1971–1972	Valenciennes	49	(1)
1972–1976	Laval	97	(5)

International career
1965	France	2	(0)
- * Club domestic league appearances and goals

Daniel Rodighiero (born 20 September 1940) is a French former professional footballer who played as a striker.
