= Coupe Charles Drago =

- Founded: 1953
- Abolished: 1965
- Region: France
- Most championships: Lens; Sochaux (3 titles each)

The Coupe Charles Drago was an elimination cup competition organised by the Ligue de Football Professionnel, between clubs that are knocked out before the quarter-finals of the Coupe de France. The tournament was founded in 1953 and was discontinued after the 1965 tournament.

== Finals ==
Key

*	Match decided by a coin toss after extra time

Final	Winner	Score	Runners-up	Venue
1953	Sochaux	3–3*	Toulouse	Parc des Princes
1954	Reims	6–3	Lille	Parc des Princes
1955	Saint-Étienne	6–3	Sedan	Parc des Princes
1956	Nîmes	3–1	Lille	Parc des Princes
1957	Marseille	3–1	Lens	Parc des Princes
1958	Saint-Étienne	2–1	Nice	Stade Pierre-Pibarot, Alès
1959	Lens	3–2	Valenciennes	Parc des Princes
1960	Lens	3–2	Toulon	Stade Robert-Diochon, Rouen
1961	Monaco	2–1	Strasbourg	Parc des Princes
1962	Racing Besançon	1–0	Le Havre	Stade Saint-Lazare, Limoges
1963	Sochaux	5–2	Sedan	Stade Auguste Bonal
1964	Sochaux	4–0	Forbach	Stade Auguste Bonal
1965	Lens	4–0	Bordeaux	Stade Félix Bollaert

== Results by team ==
Team	Winners	Runners-up	Years won	Years runner-up
Lens	3	1	1959, 1960, 1965	1957
Sochaux	3	0	1953, 1963, 1964	—
Saint-Étienne	2	0	1955, 1958	—
Monaco	1	0	1961	—
Marseille	1	0	1957	—
Reims	1	0	1954	—
Nîmes	1	0	1956	—
Racing Besançon	1	0	1962	—
Lille	0	2	—	1954, 1956
Sedan	0	2	—	1955, 1963
Toulouse	0	1	—	1953
Nice	0	1	—	1958
Valenciennes	0	1	—	1959
Toulon	0	1	—	1960
Le Havre	0	1	—	1962
Forbach	0	1	—	1964
Bordeaux	0	1	—	1965
Strasbourg	0	1	—	1961
