= André Guy =

French footballer (1941–2026)

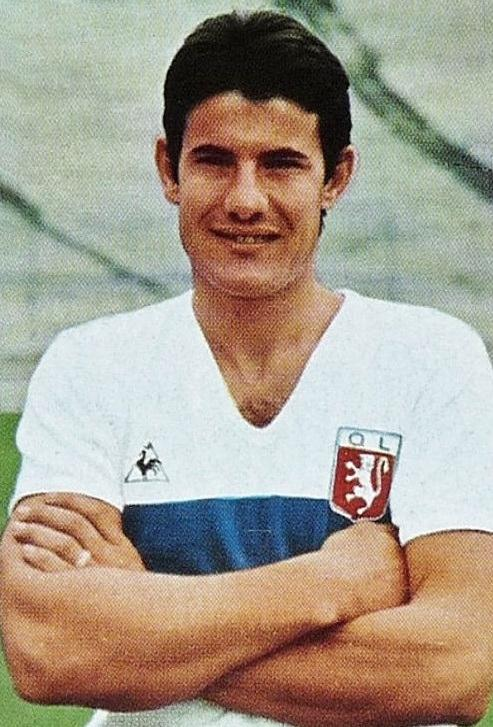
- Guy in 1970

Personal information
- Date of birth: 3 March 1941
- Place of birth: Bourg-en-Bresse, France
- Date of death: 25 September 2026 (aged 85)
- Position: Forward

Senior career*
Years	Team	Apps	(Gls)
1960–1962	Sochaux		
1962–1965	Saint-Étienne		
1965–1967	Lille		
1967–1971	Lyon		
1971–1972	Rennes		
- Toulon
- JGA Nevers

International career
1964–1968	France	8	(2)
- * Club domestic league appearances and goals

André Guy (3 March 1941 – 25 September 2026) was a French professional footballer who played as a forward. He won Ligue 2 in 1962–63 with Saint-Étienne and the following year, won Ligue 1, being second top scorer for the season with 28 goals. Between 1967 and 1971, he scored 76 goals for Lyon and was top scorer in Ligue 1 in 1968–69 with a club-record 25 goals. He scored the only goal for Rennes in the 1971 Coupe de France final against Lyon. He died on 25 September 2026, at the age of 85.
