= 1960 Coupe de France final =

- Event: 1959–60 Coupe de France
Monaco	Saint-Étienne
4	2
- After extra time
- Date: 15 May 1960
- Venue: Olympique Yves-du-Manoir, Colombes
- Referee: Marcel Lequesne
- Attendance: 38,298

The 1960 Coupe de France final was a football match played at Stade Olympique Yves-du-Manoir, Colombes on 15 May 1960 that saw AS Monaco FC defeat AS Saint-Étienne 4–2 thanks to goals by Serge Roy (2), Henri Biancheri and François Ludwikowski.

== Match details ==
15 May 1960

Monaco	4–2 (a.e.t.)	Saint-Étienne
Roy 5', 114'; Biancheri 88'; Ludwikowski 103'		Liron 43'; Domingo 86'

Stade Olympique Yves-du-Manoir, Colombes
Attendance: 38,298
Referee: Marcel Lequesne

GK	(France) Henri Alberto
DF	(France) Marcel Nowak
DF	(France) Georges Thomas
DF	(France) François Ludwikowski
DF	(France) Raymond Kaelbel (c)
MF	(France) Henri Biancheri
MF	(France) André Hess
FW	(France) Michel Hidalgo
FW	(France) Serge Roy
FW	(France) Lucien Cossou
FW	(Netherlands) Albertus Carlier
Manager:
(France) Lucien Leduc

GK	(France) Claude Abbes
DF	(France) Richard Tylinski
DF	(France) François Wicart
DF	(France) René Domingo (c)
DF	(France) Robert Herbin
MF	(France) René Ferrier
MF	(France) Georges Peyroche
FW	(France) Léon Glovacki
FW	(France) Ginès Liron
FW	(France) Jean Oleksiak
FW	(France) Manuel Balboa
Manager:
(France) René Vernier

== See also ==
- 1959–60 Coupe de France
