= 1962 Coupe de France final =

- Event: 1961–62 Coupe de France
Saint-Étienne	Nancy
1	0
- Date: 13 May 1962
- Venue: Olympique Yves-du-Manoir, Colombes
- Referee: Joseph Barbéran
- Attendance: 30,654

The 1962 Coupe de France final was a football match held at Stade Olympique Yves-du-Manoir, Colombes on May 13, 1962, that saw AS Saint-Étienne defeat FC Nancy 1–0 thanks to a goal by Jean-Claude Baulu.

== Match details ==
13 May 1962

Saint-Étienne	1–0	Nancy
Baulu 86'

Stade Olympique Yves-du-Manoir, Colombes
Attendance: 30,654
Referee: Joseph Barbéran

GK	(France) Claude Abbes
DF	(France) Juan Casado
DF	(France) Antonello Sbaiz
DF	(France) Robert Herbin
DF	(France) Richard Tylinski
MF	(France) René Domingo	(c)
MF	(France) Jean-Claude Baulu
MF	(France) Roland Guillas
FW	(France) Ginès Liron
FW	(France) René Ferrier
FW	(France) Jean Oleksiak
Manager:
(France) Henri Guérin Assistant Referees: Fourth Official:

GK	(France) Bruno Ferrero
DF	(France) Marcel Adamczyk
DF	(France) Hervé Collot
DF	(France) Georges Amanieu
DF	(Argentina) Orlando Gauthier
MF	(France) Stéphane Brezniak	(c)
MF	(France) Daniel Viaene
MF	(France) José Florindo
FW	(Argentina) Alberto Muro
FW	(France) Michel Chevalier
FW	(France) Jacques Chrétien
Manager:
(France) Mario Zatelli

== See also ==
- Coupe de France 1961-62
