= 1959–60 Coupe de France =

Tournament details
- Country: France

The Coupe de France's results of the 1959–60 season. AS Monaco FC won the final played on 15 May 1960, beating AS Saint-Étienne.

== Round of 16 ==
Team 1	Score	Team 2
AS Monaco (D1)	3–2 (a.e.t.)	US Forbach (D2)
OGC Nice (D1)	3–0	Angers SCO (D1)
Stade de Reims (D1)	3–2	Nîmes Olympique (D1)
FC Sète (D2)	3–1	Limoges FC (D1)
AS Saint-Étienne (D1)	2–1	Stade Rennais (D1)
Lille OSC (D2)	2–1	AS Gardanne (PHB)
Le Havre AC (D1)	2–1	Red Star (D2)
AS Cannes (D2)	3–2	Stade français (D1)

== Quarter-finals ==
Team 1	Score	Team 2
AS Monaco (D1)	3–1	OGC Nice (D1)
Stade de Reims (D1)	1–0 (a.e.t.)	FC Sète (D2)
AS Saint-Étienne (D1)	3–1	Lille OSC (D2)
Le Havre AC (D1)	4–2	AS Cannes (D2)

== Semi-finals ==
24 April 1960

AS Monaco (1)	2–1	Stade de Reims (1)
Cossou 14'; Hess 88'	(Report)	Siatka 69'

24 April 1960

AS Saint-Étienne (1)	3–2	Le Havre AC (1)
Peyroche 12'; Coinçon 22'; Oleksiak 34'	(Report)	Ferrari 41' (pen.); Taberner 88'

== Final ==
15 May 1960

Monaco	4–2 (a.e.t.)	Saint-Étienne
Roy 5', 114'; Biancheri 88'; Ludwikowski 103'		Liron 43'; Domingo 86'

Stade Olympique Yves-du-Manoir, Colombes
Attendance: 38,298
Referee: Marcel Lequesne
