= Jean Fusoris =

- Born: Giraumont, Meurthe-et-Moselle
- Died: 1436
- Education: University of Paris
- Occupations: Clergyman, astronomer
- Known for: Work on astrolabes

Jean Fusoris (c. 1355/1365 – 1436) was a medieval French clergyman and astronomer who designed astrolabes and other astronomical instruments made of brass. He also published a treatise on the construction of the astrolabe. His clients included the royalty of France and the Bishop of Norwich.

Fusoris was born in Giraumont where his father dealt in pewter goods. Fusoris studied first at Mézières-sur-Meuse and then arts, medicine and theology at the University of Paris, receiving a bachelor's degree in 1379, and a master's in 1391. He then became a canon at the Rheims Cathedral in 1404, moving to Paris after he was ordained in 1411, serving as canon at Notre-Dame, provost at Seine et Marne (1414) and curate at Nancy. He oversaw an atelier to manufacture astronomical instruments and collaborated at various times with Jean de Berle and Jean de Chalon. He sold an astrolabe to Richard Courtenay, the Bishop of Norwich in 1414 for which he was not fully paid. He then joined the embassy of Guillaume de Boisratier, Archbishop of Bourges, to England in 1415 and met the Bishop of Norwich. As the Hundred Years' War with England just broke out, this led to his being suspected a spy, and charged with treason, but since evidence was not available, he was exiled to Mézières-sur-Meuse. In 1423 he was commissioned to build a clock and in 1432 he worked on trigonometrical tables and wrote a book on cosmography. Apart from astrolabes, nearly 18 of which survive, he also manufactured clocks, astrolabic dials, armillary spheres / celestial globes, one of which was offered to Pope Johannes XXIII in 1410. His astrolabes are distinctive in having the star Cornu Arietis (β Arietis) erroneously located in the southern hemisphere. He wrote a treatise on the use of astrolabes dedicated to Pierre of Navarre. Fusoris produced the first wholly European-style astrolabe which was widely copied by others after him.
