= Giraumont =

Giraumont may refer to the following places in France:

- Giraumont, Meurthe-et-Moselle, a commune in the Meurthe-et-Moselle department
- Giraumont, Oise, a commune in the Oise department
