= Marcel Adamczyk =

French footballer (1935–2023)

Personal information
- Date of birth: 5 January 1935
- Place of birth: Giraumont, Meurthe-et-Moselle, France
- Date of death: 10 February 2023 (aged 88)
- Height: 1.83 m (6 ft 0 in)
- Position: Defender

Youth career
- 1952–1954: AS Giraumont

Senior career*
Years	Team	Apps	(Gls)
1954–1955	Metz	3	(0)
1955–1957	AS Giraumont		
1957–1958	Metz	20	(0)
1958–1960	AS Giraumont		
1960–1963	FC Nancy	117	(0)
1963–1968	Lille	169	(0)
1968–1971	Bergerat-Monnoyeur		

International career
1963	France	1	(0)
- * Club domestic league appearances and goals

Marcel Adamczyk (5 January 1935 – 10 February 2023) was a French footballer who played as a defender.

== Career ==
Born in Giraumont, Meurthe-et-Moselle on 5 January 1935, Adamczyk played junior football alongside his brother for AS Giraumont. He distinguished himself in a 1953 Coupe de France match against Red Star. He then left to play for Metz but refused his professional contract and returned to Giraumont. He became a professional in 1960 after signing with FC Nancy. He was also selected to play in a match for the France national B team against Italy. With Nancy, he reached the final of the 1961–62 Coupe de France, which resulted in a 1–0 loss to Saint-Étienne.

In 1963, Adamczyk left Nancy and began playing for Lille. That year, he played in his only match for the France national team against Bulgaria in Sofia. After his professional career, he played for the corporate team of Bergerat-Monnoyeur, with whom he played in the final of the Coupe nationale corpo in 1970.

== Death ==
Adamczyk died on 10 February 2023, at the age of 88.
