= Richard Tylinski =

French footballer and manager (1937–2025)

Personal information
- Date of birth: 18 September 1937
- Place of birth: Noyant-d'Allier, France
- Date of death: 16 August 2025 (aged 87)
- Height: 1.80 m (5 ft 11 in)
- Position: Defender

Senior career*
Years	Team	Apps	(Gls)
1954–1966	Saint-Étienne	312	(2)
1966–1969	Avignon	79	(0)

International career
1957–1960	France	3	(0)

Managerial career
- 1981–1983: SC Draguignan
- 1984–1985: SC Draguignan
- * Club domestic league appearances and goals

Richard Tylinski (18 September 1937 – 16 August 2025) was a French football player and manager. A defender, he played for Saint-Étienne and Avignon.

== Biography ==
Tylinski was born in Noyant-d'Allier, France, and was of Polish descent.

He began at La Combelle CCA and was quickly spotted by Saint-Étienne. Tylinski won Ligue 1 with Saint-Étienne in 1956–57 and earned a call up to the French national team in a 4-0 defeat in a friendly against England at Wembley on November 27, 1957. He made three appearances for France. In 1962, he won the Coupe de France with Saint-Étienne in a 1-0 win over Nancy in the final and the following year they won Ligue 2. Following promotion, he played a key role in Saint-Étienne’s 1963–64 French championship winning season, appearing in 31 of 34 matches.

Tylinski died on 16 August 2025, at the age of 87.

His brother, Michel also played for Saint-Étienne.

== Honours ==
- Ligue 1 champion: 1956–57, 1963–64
- Ligue 2 champion: 1962–63
- Coupe de France winner:1961–62
