= Serge Roy (footballer) =

French footballer (1932–2025)

Personal information
- Date of birth: 9 November 1932
- Place of birth: Beaune, France
- Date of death: 26 December 2025 (aged 93)
- Position: Forward

Youth career
- Beaune

Senior career*
| Years | Team | Apps | (Gls) |
| 1952–1957 | Racing Besançon | 104 | (56) |
| 1957–1962 | Monaco | 127 | (62) |
| 1962–1963 | Marseille | 36 | (14) |
| 1963 | Valenciennes | 6 | (0) |
| 1964 | Nice | 15 | (5) |
| Total | | 288 | (137) |

International career
| 1960–1961 | France B | 2 | (0) |
| 1961 | France | 1 | (0) |
- * Club domestic league appearances and goals

Serge Claude Roy (9 November 1932 – 26 December 2025) was a French footballer who played as a forward. He won the 1959–60 Coupe de France and 1960–61 French Division 1 with Monaco. He played one international game for France in 1961, as well as two for the France B team.

== Club career ==
Born in Beaune in Côte-d'Or on 9 November 1932, Roy began his youth career with local AS Beaune before starting his senior career with Racing Besançon in 1952. He played for Monaco between 1957 and 1962, winning their first Coupe de France in 1960 and a Division 1 title in 1960–61. He scored 62 goals in 127 games for the club from the principality. He later played for Marseille, Valenciennes and Nice.

After ending his professional career, Roy remained playing amateur football in the city of Nice while working for Le Coq Sportif. In 1973, he had a testimonial match and invited his friend Alfredo Di Stéfano, who brought his former Real Madrid teammates Ferenc Puskás, Paco Gento and José Santamaría to play as well; through Le Coq Sportif's connections to Ajax as their kit suppliers, Johan Cruyff was also enlisted.

== International career ==
Roy played two games for the France B team, those being two 2–2 draws, one away to their Portuguese counterparts on 8 December 1960, and one at home against the Belgian B side on 15 March 1961.

On 2 April 1961, Roy played his only game for the France national team, a 2–0 loss to Spain at the Santiago Bernabéu Stadium. Manager Georges Verriest played him in attack alongside Raymond Kopa. He was called up again on 12 November for a crucial 1962 FIFA World Cup qualifier away to Bulgaria but withdrew with a calf strain.

== Personal life and death ==
Roy was married to Danièle. Their son Éric Roy was also a footballer, for clubs including Nice and Marseille, and manager of clubs including Nice and Brest. Roy died on 26 December 2025, at the age of 93. Between the September 2023 death of Dominique Colonna and his own death, he was the oldest living international footballer to play for France, a record that passed to Serge Masnaghetti.

== Honours ==
Monaco

- Division 1: 1960–61
- Coupe de France: 1959–60
