= Enrico Alberto =

Italian footballer and manager (1933–2019)

Personal information
- Date of birth: 18 November 1933
- Place of birth: Paesana, Italy
- Date of death: 20 April 2019 (aged 85)
- Place of death: Aubenas, France
- Height: 1.82 m (6 ft 0 in)
- Position: Goalkeeper

Senior career*
Years	Team	Apps	(Gls)
1952–1954	Aubenas		
1954–1956	Lyon	50	(0)
1956–1960	Monaco	96	(0)
1960–1962	Sochaux	54	(0)
1962–1965	Grenoble	43	(0)
1963–1964	→ Wiener SC (loan)		
1965–1967	Ajaccio	64	(0)
1967–1968	Avignon	25	(0)
Total		337	(0)

Managerial career
- 1968–1972: Aubenas
- * Club domestic league appearances and goals

Enrico Alberto (18 November 1933 – 20 April 2019) was an Italian professional football player and manager active primarily in France, where he was known as Henri Alberto and played as a goalkeeper.

== Career ==
Born in Paesana, Alberto played for Aubenas, Lyon, Monaco, Sochaux, Grenoble, Wiener SC, Ajaccio and Avignon. With Monaco he won the Ligue 1 title and the Coupe de France. He later managed Aubenas.

== Later life and death ==
Alberto died on 23 April 2019, at the age of 85, and was buried in Aubenas.
