= René Domingo =

French footballer (1928-2013)

Personal information
- Full name: René Domingo
- Date of birth: 28 December 1928
- Place of birth: Sourcieux-les-Mines, France
- Date of death: 13 June 2013 (aged 84)
- Place of death: Clermont-Ferrand, France
- Height: 1.79 m (5 ft 10 in)
- Position: Midfielder

Team information
- Current team: Saint-Étienne

Youth career
- La Combelle

Senior career*
Years	Team	Apps	(Gls)
1949–1964	Saint-Étienne	456	(38)

International career^{‡}
1957	France	1	(0)
- * Club domestic league appearances and goals as of 24 November 2019 ‡ National team caps and goals as of 24 November 2019

René "Bill" Domingo (28 December 1928 – 13 June 2013) was a French professional footballer who spent his entire career as a midfielder for Saint-Étienne. He was their long-term captain in the 1950s and 1960s, and helped the team to their first ever domestic trophies.

== Professional career ==
A youth product of La Combelle, Domingo joined Saint-Étienne in 1949, and became their emblematic player and captain. He captained Saint-Étienne as they won their first ever trophy, the Coupe Charles Drago in 1955. He also led the club to their first two Ligue 1 titles in 1956–57, their first Trophée des Champions in 1957 and 1962, Ligue 2 in 1962–63, and their first Coupe de France in 1962. He is the record appearance holder in the history of Saint-Étienne, with 537 games, and 423 in Ligue 1.

== International career ==
Domingo was born in France to Spanish parents. Domingo made one appearance for the France national football team in a friendly 4-0 loss to England on 27 November 1957.

== Death ==
Domingo died on 13 July 2013, in Clermont-Ferrand.

== Honours ==
Saint-Étienne

- Ligue 1 (2): 1956–57, 1963–64
- Ligue 2 (1): 1962–63
- Coupe de France (1): 1962
- Trophée des Champions (2): 1957, 1962
- Coupe Charles Drago (2): 1955, 1958
