= 1961–62 Coupe de France =

French football cup

Tournament details
- Country: France

The Coupe de France's results of the 1961–62 season. AS Saint-Étienne won the final played on May 13, 1962, beating FC Nancy.

== Round of 16 ==
Team 1	Score	Team 2
AS Saint-Étienne (D1)	3–0	RC Lens (D1)
AS Béziers (D2)	1–0	UA Sedan-Torcy (D1)
FC Metz (D1)	2–1	Stade Français FC (D1)
Olympique de Marseille (D2)	2–1	FC Grenoble (D2)
FC Nancy (D1)	2–1	ESA Brive (CFA)
AS Monaco (D1)	3–0	AS Troyes-Savinienne (D2)
Angers SCO (D1)	2–2 (a.e.t.)	Toulon (D2)
Stade de Reims (D1)	1–0	FC Sochaux-Montbéliard (D1)
Replay
Angers SCO (D1)	3–1 (a.e.t.)	Toulon (D2)

== Quarter-finals ==
Team 1	Score	Team 2
AS Saint-Étienne (D1)	3–0	AS Béziers (D2)
FC Metz (D1)	1–0	AS Monaco (D1)
FC Nancy (D1)	1–0	Stade de Reims (D1)
Angers SCO (D1)	1–0	Olympique de Marseille (D2)

== Semi-finals ==
1 April 1962

AS Saint-Étienne (1)	1–0	Angers SCO (1)
Oleksiak 24'	(Report)

1 April 1962

FC Nancy (1)	1–0	FC Metz (1)
Gauthier 49'	(Report)

== Final ==
13 May 1962

Saint-Étienne	1–0	Nancy
Baulu 86'

Stade Olympique Yves-du-Manoir, Colombes
Attendance: 30,654
Referee: Joseph Barbéran
