= Roland Guillas =

French footballer (1936–2022)

Personal information
- Date of birth: 23 September 1936
- Place of birth: Lorient, France
- Date of death: 9 November 2022 (aged 86)
- Place of death: Mérignac, France
- Height: 1.66 m (5 ft 5 in)
- Position: Midfielder

Senior career*
Years	Team	Apps	(Gls)
1954–1960	Bordeaux		
1960–1962	Saint-Étienne		
1962–1963	Grenoble	25	(1)
1963–1964	Rouen	21	(3)
1964–1967	Bordeaux	89	(9)
1967–1971	Lorient		
1971–1973	AS Angoulême		

International career
1958–1962	France	9	(1)
- * Club domestic league appearances and goals

Roland Guillas (23 September 1936 – 9 November 2022) was a French professional footballer who played as a midfielder. He made nine appearances for the France national team from 1958 to 1962.
