= Henri Biancheri =

French footballer (1932–2019)

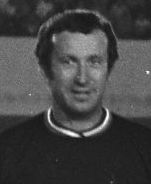

Personal information
- Date of birth: 30 July 1932
- Place of birth: Marseille, France
- Date of death: 1 December 2019 (aged 87)
- Position: Midfielder

Senior career*
| Years | Team | Apps | (Gls) |
| 1952–1954 | FC Sochaux | | |
| 1954–1957 | Angers SCO | | |
| 1957–1964 | AS Monaco | 224 | (18) |
| 1964–1966 | RC Paris | | |

International career
| 1960 | France | 2 | (0) |
- * Club domestic league appearances and goals

Henri Biancheri (30 July 1932 – 1 December 2019) was a French association football player and sports executive. He played midfielder for 14 seasons including seven at AS Monaco FC where he was a member of two Ligue 1 championship squads and twice a winner of the Coupe de France. He also earned two caps with the France national team in 1960.

After he retired as a player, he became a commercial director at Adidas from 1966 to 1986, and then technical director at Monaco until 2005. He left Monaco to work in recruiting for Olympique de Marseille.

Later in life, he became a naturalized citizen of Monaco and retired there after he left Marseille. He died on 1 December 2019 at the age of 87.
