= François Ludo =

French footballer (1930-1992)

Personal information
- Full name: François Ludvikovski
- Date of birth: 4 March 1930
- Place of birth: Noyelles-sous-Lens, France
- Date of death: June 29, 1992 (aged 62)
- Height: 1.72 m (5 ft 8 in)
- Position: Defender

Senior career*
Years	Team	Apps	(Gls)
1949–1953	Lens	100	(29)
1953–1962	Monaco	281	(20)
1962–1963	Grenoble	20	(0)

International career
1961	France	1	(0)
- * Club domestic league appearances and goals

François Ludo (4 March 1930 – 29 June 1992) was a French football player.

== Personal life ==
Ludo was born in France and was of Polish descent. He was the uncle of the French footballer, and RC Lens legend Éric Sikora.
