= Jean-Claude Baulu =

French footballer (1936–2020)

Personal information
- Date of birth: 15 June 1936
- Place of birth: Courbevoie, France
- Date of death: 23 October 2020 (aged 84)
- Place of death: Auxerre, France
- Height: 1.65 m (5 ft 5 in)
- Position: Midfielder

Senior career*
Years	Team	Apps	(Gls)
1955–1956	Stade Français	53	(26)
1956–1960	Valenciennes	150	(35)
1960–1964	Saint-Étienne	81	(20)
1964–1965	Marseille	22	(3)
Total		306	(84)
- * Club domestic league appearances and goals

Jean-Claude Baulu (15 June 1936 – 23 October 2020) was a French footballer who played as a midfielder.

== Biography ==
Upon his arrival at Valenciennes and Saint-Étienne, Baulu evolved to become a striker. With the Verts, he won the Coupe de France in 1962 and the championship in 1964. He scored the winning goal in the 86th minute to win the Coupe de France, giving Saint-Étienne its first such victory in history. He finished his playing career in 1965 with Marseille.

== Honours ==
Saint-Étienne'

- Ligue 1: 1964
- Ligue 2: 1963
- Coupe de France: 1962

Valenciennes'

- Coupe Charles Drago runner-up: 1959

Individual'

- French Division 2 Team: 1962, 1963
