= 1962–63 French Division 2 =

24th season of the second-tier football league in France

Division 2
- Season: 1962–63

Statistics of Division 2 in the 1962–63 season.

== Overview ==
It was contested by 19 teams, and Saint-Étienne won the championship.

== League standings ==
Pos	Team	Pld	W	D	L	GF	GA	GD	Pts	Promotion or relegation
1	Saint-Étienne	36	25	8	3	86	46	+40	58	Promoted
2	Nantes	36	25	4	7	82	38	+44	54	Promoted
3	Sochaux-Montbéliard	36	21	9	6	68	33	+35	51	
4	Le Havre	36	18	11	7	63	43	+20	47	
5	Red Star Paris	36	17	9	10	69	60	+9	43	
6	US Boulogne	36	15	9	12	66	55	+11	39	
7	Lille	36	15	8	13	63	59	+4	38	
8	Limoges	36	14	9	13	57	60	−3	37	
9	FC Metz	36	12	12	12	62	46	+16	36	
10	Béziers	36	15	6	15	64	62	+2	36	
11	Cannes	36	16	3	17	67	70	−3	35	
12	Besançon	36	12	8	16	65	72	−7	32	
13	Forbach	36	11	7	18	36	53	−17	29	
14	Roubaix-Tourcoing	36	9	10	17	46	53	−7	28	
15	CA Paris	36	9	10	17	39	62	−23	28	
16	Cherbourg	36	7	13	16	46	62	−16	27	
17	AS Troyes	36	8	10	18	50	76	−26	26	
18	Toulon	36	7	9	20	41	70	−29	23	
19	Aix-en-Provence	36	6	5	25	32	73	−41	17	

Source: rsssf.com
