= Giraumont, Meurthe-et-Moselle =

Giraumont
- Commune
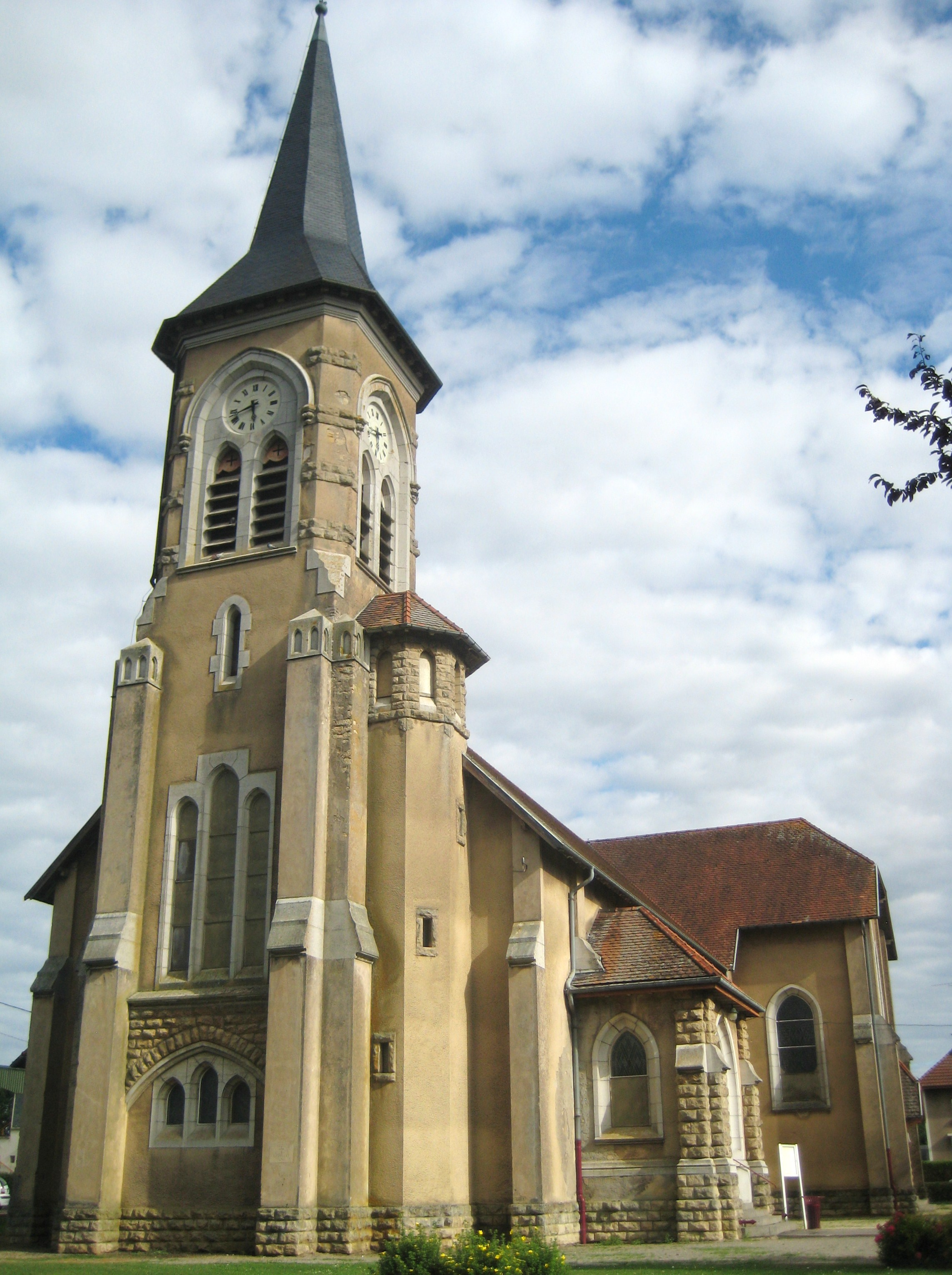
- The church in Giraumont

- Coat of arms
- Location of Giraumont
- Location within France Location within Grand Est
- Coordinates: 49°10′19″N 5°54′54″E
- Country: France
- Region: Grand Est
- Department: Meurthe-et-Moselle
- Arrondissement: Val-de-Briey
- Canton: Jarny
- Intercommunality: Orne Lorraine Confluences

Government
  - Mayor (2020–2026): Jean-Claude Mafféi
- Area^{1}: 7.63 km^{2} (2.95 sq mi)
- Elevation: 197 m (646 ft)
- Highest elevation: 235 m (771 ft)
- Lowest elevation: 183 m (600 ft)
- Population (2023): 1,380
  - Density: 181/km^{2} (468/sq mi)
- Time zone: UTC+01:00 (CET)
  - Summer (DST): UTC+02:00 (CEST)
- INSEE/Postal code: 54227 /54780
- ^{1} French Land Register data, which excludes lakes, ponds, glaciers > 1 km^{2} (0.386 sq mi or 247 acres) and river estuaries.

Giraumont (French pronunciation: [ʒiʁomɔ̃]) is a commune in the Meurthe-et-Moselle department in north-eastern France.

== See also ==
- Communes of the Meurthe-et-Moselle department
