= LDLC Arena =

Multi-purpose indoor arena in Lyon, France

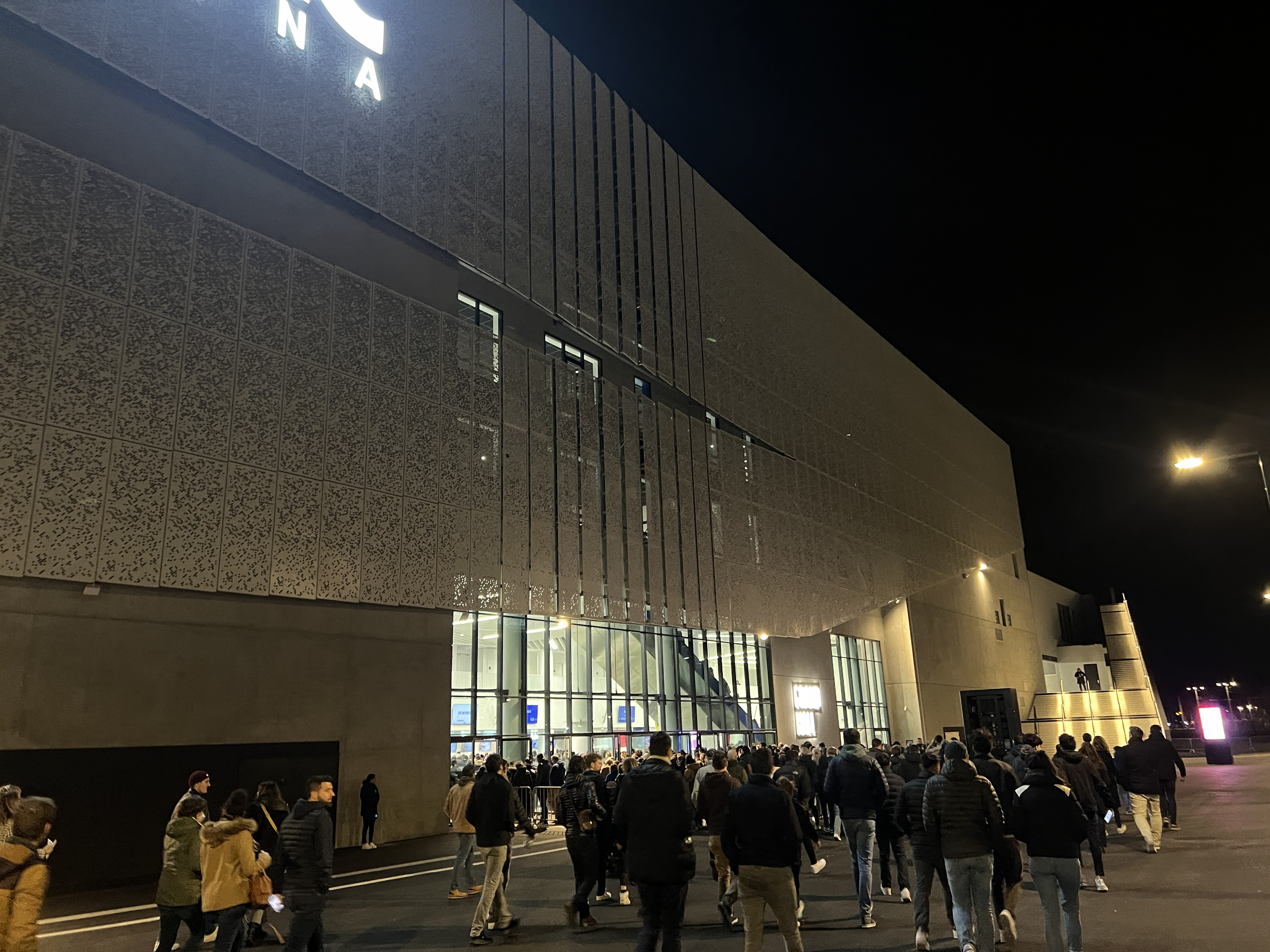
- Interactive map of LDLC Arena
- Former names: OL Arena
- Address: 5 Avenue Simone Veil
- Location: Décines-Charpieu, Metropolis of Lyon, France
- Coordinates: 45°46′07″N 4°58′42″E
- Owner: OL Groupe
- Capacity: Concerts: 16,000; Basketball: 12,523
- Public transit: Décines–OL Vallée; Décines–OL Vallée

Construction
- Groundbreaking: January 2022
- Opened: 23 November 2023
- Cost: €141 million
- Architect: Populous
- Structural engineer: Vinci SA
- Services engineer: Vinci SA

Tenant
- LDLC ASVEL (LNB Pro A) (2023–present)

Website
- Official website

The OL Arena, officially known as the LDLC Arena for sponsorship reasons, is a multi-purpose indoor arena located in Décines-Charpieu in the Metropolis of Lyon, France. With a capacity of 16,000, the LDLC Arena is the third largest indoor arena in France after the Plenitude Arena and Accor Arena; it mainly hosts sporting events and concerts. Owned by the OL Groupe, it was inaugurated in November 2023 and is located near the Parc Olympique Lyonnais stadium.

== History ==
=== Planning and construction ===
On 7 December 2018, the ASVEL Lyon-Villeurbanne basketball club announced a multi-function arena project, which would notably host LDLC ASVEL matches in the EuroLeague.

In February 2019, Jean-Michel Aulas, then-owner and president of Olympique Lyonnais, announced plans to build a multi-purpose arena next to the stadium. It would become another part of the OL Vallée and would accommodate 10,000 to 15,000 people depending on the event. Aulas also stated that discussions were being held with ex-National Basketball Association player Tony Parker, owner of the ASVEL Lyon-Villeurbanne basketball club, about moving from the Astroballe to the new arena. In June 2019, Aulas and Parker entered into a partnership with OL taking a 25% minority stake in LDLC ASVEL and LDLC ASVEL Féminin, with ASVEL to play its EuroLeague home games in the new arena. The club would continue to play the remaining games in the Astroballe.

In mid-June 2021, ASVEL Lyon-Villeurbanne was accepted as a shareholder in the EuroLeague with a permanent right to participate with the A license. To do this, the club needed a venue that met the requirements of the EuroLeague for international games; the Astroballe had only 5,556 seats.

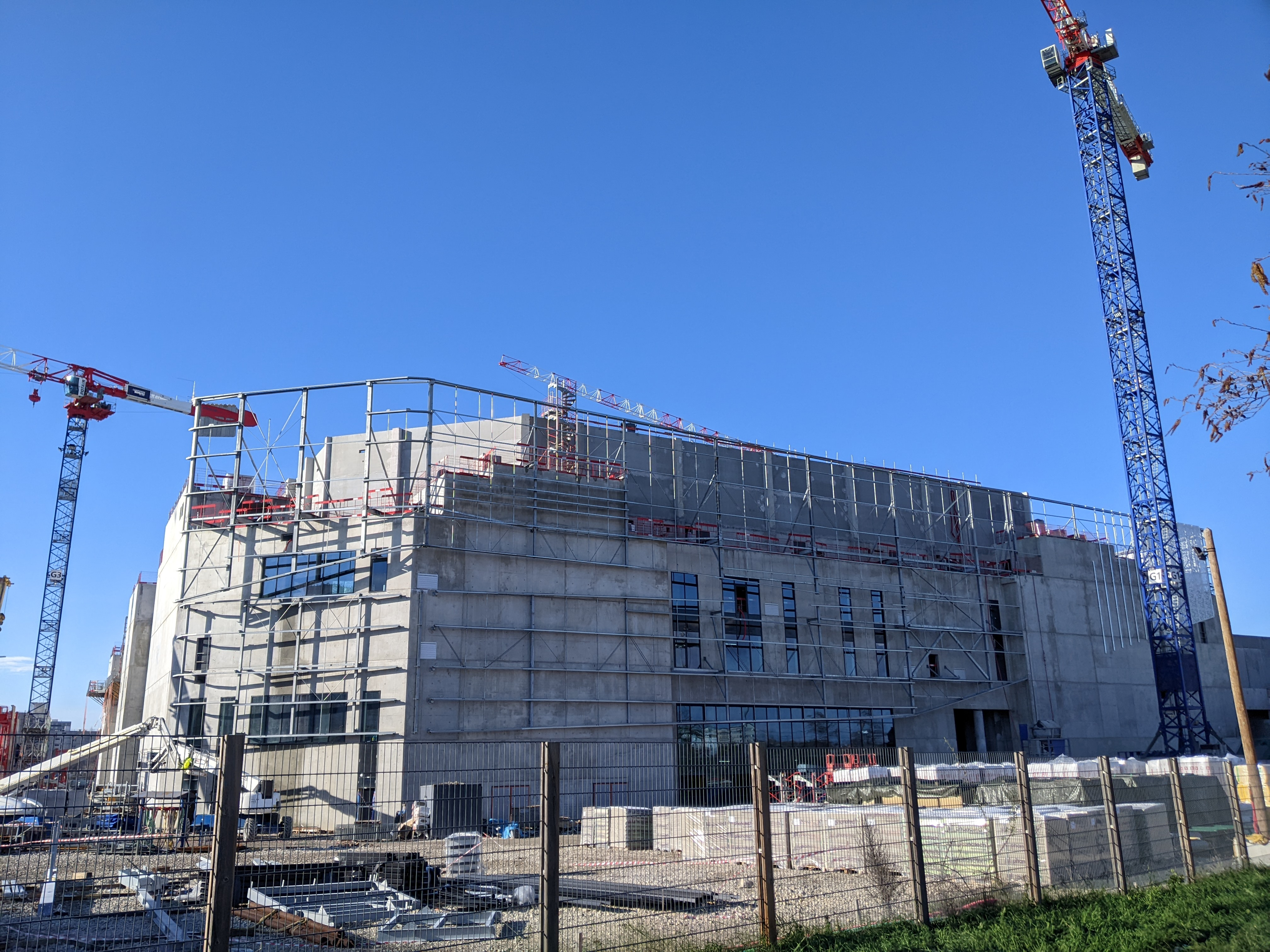
The arena under construction in January 2023

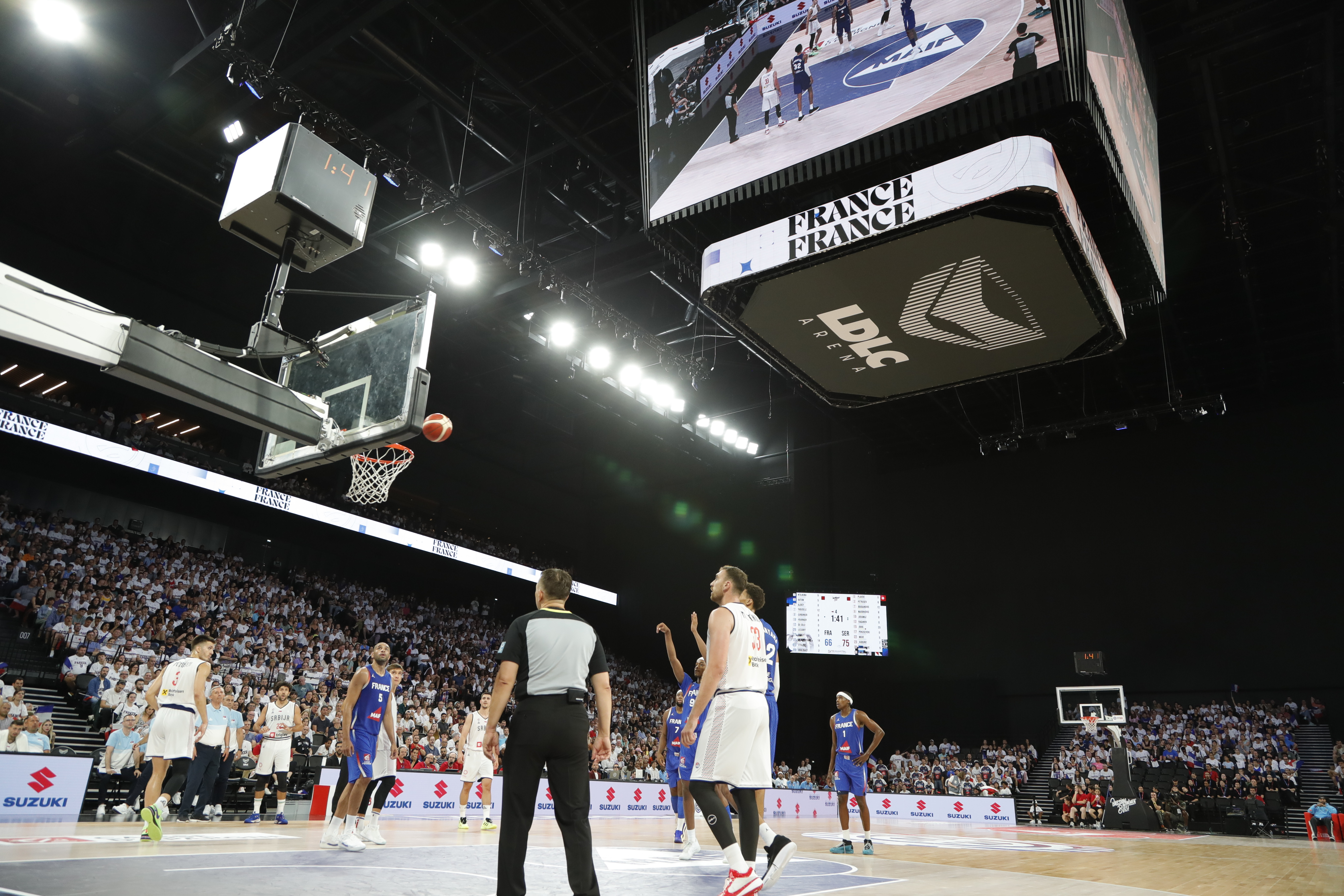
France - Serbia basketball game in July 2024 at the LDLC Arena (2024 Olympics Preparation Match)

In July 2021, Olympique Lyon awarded the architectural firm Populous and Citinea, a subsidiary of the French construction group Vinci SA, the contract to design and build the multi-purpose hall in Décines-Charpieu, a commune located in the Metropolis of Lyon, France. According to information at the time, the arena would offer 12,000 to 16,000 seats and would be the largest event hall outside of Paris, holding 80 to 120 events per year, such as concerts, sports and esports competitions, seminars, and trade fairs. The two companies were already involved in the design and construction of the Groupama Stadium, which opened in 2016. According to plans, construction with a planned cost of 141 million euros would begin at the end of 2021 and be completed two years later at the end of 2023. In mid-October of that year, the Olympique Lyonnais Groupe signed a multi-year contract with Live Nation Entertainment. The agreement began with construction starting in early 2022.

The name of the multi-purpose hall was presented at the beginning of December 2021. Groupe LDLC, owner of computer and technology stores and sponsor of ASVEL Lyon-Villeurbanne and the e-sports division of Olympique Lyon, would be the title sponsor of the event arena for eight years.

At the beginning of February 2022, the groundworks that began in January were completed and construction began. In May of that year, OL Groupe presented a financing plan for the construction of the hall. The group took over the entire financing. The project was supported by the subsidiary OL Vallée Arena. The planned costs of 141 million euros were to be financed through equity capital of 51 million euros and a real estate leasing of 90 million euros. The OL Vallée Arena signed a 15-year amortizing real estate lease agreement with a group of five banks, which provided for a residual value of 20 percent. The first seats in the new hall were presented in a ceremony on 6 September 2022.

The shell construction was completed in February 2023. This was followed by the roofing of the hall. It was scheduled to be closed by the end of March that year. The support structure weighs 1,200t and spans 70m. To achieve a better carbon footprint, the proportion of concrete was reduced by 25 percent compared to the original plan and low-carbon concrete was used. The opening was scheduled for December 15, 2023. LDLC ASVEL was scheduled to play 13 to 17 games in the arena annually.

As it became known at the end of September 2023, Olympique Lyon intended to give up partial or complete control of the arena. The American entrepreneur John Textor completed the purchase of Olympique Lyon in December 2022 through his holding company OL Groupe. OL Groupe had a net debt of 321 million euros at the end of 2022, according to its latest annual accounts, which showed a net loss in the first half of 60.7 million euros. Textor wanted to eliminate all debts not related to Groupama Stadium within two years. Olympique made the offer of 40% or full control of the LDLC Arena. In May 2023, the club sold a majority stake in the Olympique Lyonnais women's team to US businesswoman Michele Kang. OL Groupe was also exploring the sale of OL Reign, a women's soccer franchise in Tacoma from the US National Women's Soccer League.

== Events ==
Indochine concert at the LDLC Arena in February 2025, as part of the band's "Arena Tour" (left) and Gojira performing live at the arena in 2025 (right)

During a visit to the arena on 12 September 2023, by Xavier Pierrot, deputy general manager of the OL Groupe and responsible for the LDLC Arena, and Tony Parker, the first events in the new arena were announced. On 23 November 2023, the first basketball game was held in the arena, which ended in a 100–101 loss by LDLC ASVEL to FC Bayern Munich after two overtimes, as part of the tenth round of the 2023–24 EuroLeague regular season and was attended by 11,354 spectators. During the season, a total of eleven games are scheduled to be played in the LDLC Arena. It will host matches for the 2031 FIBA Basketball World Cup and ice hockey at the 2030 Winter Olympics in the French Alps.

=== Concerts and shows ===
Comedian and actress Florence Foresti also made her first appearance on stage on November 28. Music artists Sting and Lomepal are scheduled to perform in December of that year. In 2024, more concerts by artists including Calogero, Shaka Ponk, Patrick Bruel, Green Day and Michel Sardou are to follow. It will also host the touring musical Starmania for 6 dates in October 2024. In 2025, ATEEZ became the first kpop group held solo concert at the venue for their Towards The Light: Will To Power world tour; Dua Lipa performed at the arena for 2 nights in May 2025 for her Radical Optimism Tour, Katy Perry performed her Lifetimes Tour for 1 night in November, and Lady Gaga performed her Mayhem Ball for 2 nights in November as well. Doja Cat is performing at the arena in June 2026 for her Tour Ma Vie World Tour.

Partial list of concerts
Date	Performer(s)	Event	Opening Act(s)	Attendance	Revenue	Additional notes
1 December 2023	Lomepal	Mauvais Ordre Tour				
16 January 2024	Calogero	A.M.O.U.R. Tour		9,300		
2 February 2024	Shaka Ponk	The Final Fucked Up Tour !				
3 February	Shaka Ponk	The Final Fucked Up Tour !				
5 June 2024	Green Day	The Saviors Tour	The Interrupters	14,623 / 15,472	$1,162,015	
6 June 2024	Patrick Bruel	Tour 2024				
6 September 2024	Justin Timberlake	The Forget Tomorrow World Tour		26,397 / 26,397	$3,196,570	
7 September 2024	Justin Timberlake	The Forget Tomorrow World Tour		26,397 / 26,397	$3,196,570	
28 September 2024	Jonas Brothers	Five Albums. One Night. The World Tour	Mimi Webb			
2 October 2024	Dadju & Tayc	Héritage World Tour				A second show was added due to high demand.
3 October	Dadju & Tayc	Héritage World Tour				A second show was added due to high demand.
March 9, 2024	Hoshi	Coeur Parapluie Tour				
20 November 2024	Patrick Bruel	Tour 2024				
27 November 2024	Calogero	A.M.O.U.R. Tour				
25 January 2025	ATEEZ	Towards The Light: Will To Power World Tour		10,894 / 11,376	$1,785,775	ATEEZ became the first kpop group held solo concert at the venue.
4 February 2025	Indochine	Arena Tour	The Salinger	50,000		
5 February 2025	Indochine	Arena Tour	The Salinger	50,000		
7 February 2025	Indochine	Arena Tour	Trigones Plus	50,000		
8 February 2025	Indochine	Arena Tour	The Salinger	50,000		
14 March 2025	Julien Doré	Nouvelle tournée des Zéniths				
22 March 2025	Clara Luciani					
12 April 2025	Tiakola	Bdlm Tour				
15 May 2025	Dua Lipa	Radical Optimism Tour	Alessi Rose			
16 May 2025	Dua Lipa	Radical Optimism Tour	Alessi Rose			
10 October 2025	Indochine	Arena Tour	Lou Sirkis	62,500		
11 October 2025	Indochine	Arena Tour	Lou Sirkis	62,500		
14 October 2025	Indochine	Arena Tour	Lou Sirkis	62,500		
17 October 2025	Indochine	Arena Tour	Lou Sirkis	62,500		
18 October 2025	Indochine	Arena Tour	Lou Sirkis	62,500		
26 October 2025	Helena	La 1ère tournée				
7 November 2025	Katy Perry	The Lifetimes Tour	Becky Hill			
13 November 2025	Lady Gaga	The Mayhem Ball		26,324 / 26,324	$5,297,329	
14 November 2025	Lady Gaga	The Mayhem Ball		26,324 / 26,324	$5,297,329	
22 November 2025	Pierre Garnier	Chaque seconde Tour				
25 November 2025	Gims	Le Dernier Tour				
26 November 2025	Gims	Le Dernier Tour				
27 November 2025	Gims	Le Dernier Tour				
28 November 2025	Gims	Le Dernier Tour				
5 December 2025	Julien Doré	Nouvelle tournée des Zéniths				
6 December 2025	M. Pokora	Adrenaline Tour				
5 February 2026	Clara Luciani	Tour MMXXV				
8 February 2026	Feu! Chatterton					
26 February 2026	Orelsan	Tour 2026				A second show was added due to high demand.
27 February 2026	Orelsan	Tour 2026				A second show was added due to high demand.
March 66 2026	Rosalía	Lux Tour				
4 April 2026	Julien Doré	Nouvelle tournée des Zéniths				
20 May 2026	Damso	Beyah Tour				
21 May 2026	Damso	Beyah Tour				
6 June 2026	Doja Cat	Tour Ma Vie World Tour				
15 November 2026	Deep Purple	Tour 2026	Jayler			
14 January 2027	Claudio Capéo					
5 February 2027	Hoshi	Bonjour Docteur Tour				

=== Professional wrestling ===
American professional wrestling promotion WWE hosted two events at the arena: the first was a local live broadcast of the television program Friday Night SmackDown on 3 May 2024, followed by the pay-per-view and livestreaming event, Backlash France, a day later, which was broadcast live worldwide. This was the first time that an episode of SmackDown and a WWE pay-per-view and livestreaming event were held in the country. WWE would return to the arena with the 29 August 2025 episode of SmackDown

=== Sports events ===
Date	Event	Type of event	Attendance
3	WWE SmackDown	Professional wrestling	
4	Backlash France	Professional wrestling	11628
11	France vs. United States	Handball	
29	WWE SmackDown	Professional wrestling	

== See also ==
- List of indoor arenas in France
