= Alexander Bafer =

American entrepreneur (born 1971)

- Born: July 7, 1971 (age 55); United States
- Education: St. John’s University
- Occupations: Entrepreneur, film producer
- Years active: 2000s–present
- Organizations: FaceBank Group, Carolco Pictures, Eagle Football Holdings
- Known for: Co-founder of FaceBank Group; former CEO of Carolco Pictures; board member of Eagle Football Holdings
- Title: Director, Eagle Football Holdings

Alexander Bafer (born 7 July 1971) is an American entrepreneur. He is the co-founder of FaceBank Group, a virtual entertainment company, former CEO of Carolco Pictures, and a board member of Eagle Football Holdings, the leading stakeholder of professional football clubs Botafogo, Crystal Palace F.C., Olympique Lyonnais, and RWD Molenbeek.

== Early life ==
Bafer attended Syosset High School, then St. John's University.

== Career ==
=== FaceBank Group and FuboTV merger ===
In 2009, Bafer co-founded FaceBank Group with media technology entrepreneur John Textor. The company developed and marketed technology-driven IP for sports, movies, and live performances.

In 2020, under the leadership of Bafer and Textor, FaceBank Group acquired FuboTV, an American over-the-top sports streaming television service, in a reverse merger that enabled FuboTV to operate as a public company.

=== Eagle Football Holdings ===
In 2025, Bafer became a director of Eagle Football Holdings, the leading stakeholder of professional football clubs including Olympique Lynonnais and Crystal Palace F.C. Bafer went on to publicly declare his support for the multi-club investment group's prospective takeover of Everton F.C. later that year.

=== Carolco Pictures ===
In 2015, Bafer purchased the name and logo of Carolco Pictures, an independent film studio that hit its peak in the 1990s with blockbuster successes including the first three films of the Rambo franchise before going bankrupt in 1995.

On January 20, 2015, Bafer renamed his existing production company from Brick Top Productions to Carolco Pictures. He then recruited Carolco's original founder, Mario Kassar, as the chief development executive, before both Bafer and Kassar left the company in 2016.
