= OL Groupe =

French sports holding company

- Type: Holding company
- Traded as: Euronext Paris: EFG
- Industry: Football, entertainment, real estate
- Founded: 1 February 1999; 27 years ago in Lyon, France
- Founder: Jean-Michel Aulas
- Headquarters: Lyon, France
- Key people: Michele Kang
- Owner: Michele Kang
- Website: www.ol.fr/en/ol-group-1

The OL Groupe is a French holding company created in 1999, primarily known for its ownership and management of the Olympique Lyonnais professional men's and women's association football clubs and their stadium, the Parc Olympique Lyonnais.

== History ==
The OL Group as a holding company was officially created on 1 February 1999, announced in the same month as Pathé group obtaining a minority stake of 34% on an investment of €15.2 million. Lyon owner Jean-Michel Aulas owned the remaining 66% of the holding company and controlled its operations as chief executive officer.

=== Land project ===
On 9 February 2007, OL Groupe went public on the Paris Stock Exchange in an initial public offering, the first time a French football club had done so, by selling 28% of its stock at €24 per share. This raised €89 million toward the financing of the OL Land project, a property development that included a stadium to be named Stade des Lumières, French for Stadium of Lights.

After numerous appeals and delays, OL Groupe signed the stadium's building permit on 3 February 2012, at a total cost of €405 million, but the project's financing was not finalized until July 2013. The stadium opened on 9 January 2016, five and a half years after its initially scheduled completion date, and was named Parc Olympique Lyonnais.

=== IDG Capital investment ===
In August 2016, OL Groupe announced that Chinese investment fund IDG Capital had obtained a 20% stake in OL Groupe for €100 million. The deal was finalized in February 2017. OL Groupe formed a joint company, Beijing OL FC, with OL Groupe holding a 45% share to establish partnerships with local companies, create football schools, and expand the Lyon football brand in China.

=== ASVEL Basket investment ===
On 22 June 2019, OL Groupe acquired a 25% stake in French men's basketball club ASVEL Basket of Villeurbanne for €3.4 million, and a 10% stake in its women's team for €300,000. OL Groupe also unveiled plans for a €100 million performance hall near the stadium, now named Groupama Stadium, that could host concerts at a capacity of 16,000 people and sporting events for up to 12,000 people, suitable for ASVEL Basket to play its matches there. Former National Basketball Association player Tony Parker was president of the club and majority shareholder of ASVEL Basket, and became an ambassador of the OL brand in the United States.

At the end of December 2020, OL Groupe acquired an additional 6.3% stake in ASVEL Basket's men's team, for a total stake of 31.67%. As of 14 February 2023, OL Groupe's stake was 33%, and Parker was reportedly considering selling his stake.

=== Reign FC acquisition ===
In October 2019, OL Groupe announced record turnover of €309 million and confirmed its objective of reaching €400 million in revenue by 2024. OL Groupe president Jean-Michel Aulas also announced negotiations for the acquisition of an unnamed women's football franchise playing in United States' top-division league, the National Women's Soccer League (NWSL).

On 25 November 2019, OL Groupe announced exclusive discussions to acquire NWSL club Reign FC, then based in Tacoma, Washington. OL Groupe completed the acquisition on 19 December 2019, for $3.51 million and rebranded the team OL Reign. OL Groupe would hold an 89.5% stake in the company through American holding company OL Groupe LLC, and former Reign owner Bill Predmore would remain CEO and retain a 7.5% stake. Tony Parker also acquired a 3% stake in Reign FC as part of the deal. Due to the NWSL's American franchise structure, OL Groupe also indirectly became a shareholder in the league.

=== Team LDLC partnership ===
On 7 January 2020, eSports club Team LDLC renamed to LDLC OL as part of a partnership with Lyon. The partnership ended on 16 May 2023, and the club would cease operations by the end of July 2023.

=== Other holdings ===
OL Groupe has held a 51% stake in the Medical Academy of Football (Académie Médicale de Football), a stake in futsal and entertainment center chain Le Five, a stake in amusement park SCI Too Fun Parc, and a 10% stake in Brazilian football club Resende.

=== Acquisition by John Textor ===
On 21 June 2022, OL Groupe announced the pending or eventual sale of all shares held by Aulas's holding company Holnest, Pathé, and IDG Capital to Eagle Football Holdings, a holding company controlled by American businessman John Textor and including Jamie Salter. Eagle Football Holdings owned 40% of English club Crystal Palace, 80% of Belgian club R.W.D. Molenbeek and 90% of Brazilian club Botafogo. The agreement would retain Aulas as CEO for at least three years and retain OL Groupe's executive committee.

However, Aulas resigned on 8 May 2023, less than a year after the sale's announcement. Eagle Football named Aulas honorary chairman of OL Groupe and gave him €10 million in exit compensation, and named Textor interim CEO of OL Groupe.

=== Sale of OL Féminine and OL Reign ===
On 13 April 2023, L'Équipe reported that Textor would sell 52% of OL Groupe's women's association football team OL Féminin to American businesswoman Y. Michele Kang, who owns the NWSL's Washington Spirit. OL Groupe denied the report, and instead confirmed that it had instead hired an investment bank to facilitate the sale of its NWSL club OL Reign. On 16 May, OL Groupe and Kang announced the formation of a separate holding company that would consist of the Washington Spirit and OL Féminin, in which Kang would have a controlling 52% stake, the OL Groupe-affiliated OL Association a 36% stake, and OL Groupe a 12% stake in exchange for a 50-year license of the OL brand. Kang would also join OL Groupe's board of directors. As of 17 May 2023, the deal was pending approval of the NWSL and French regulators. Textor said he expects to sell OL Reign for €50 million, and Kang's deal for OL Féminin valued the European side at $54.4 million.

On 17 June 2023, L'Equipe reported that French football financial overseers Direction Nationale du Contrôle de Gestion (DNCG) was prepared to sanction Lyon if it failed to account for €60 million before 30 June. The sanctions were announced on 4 July, with Lyon's wage bill and transfers subject to DNCG supervision. Following his appointment as chief executive officer in succession of Aulas, Santiago Cucci noted that while multiple offers for OL Reign had been made with a minimum sale price of $53 million, the club had not yet been sold as of 6 July. Cucci was formerly CEO of the American Dockers clothing brand and had no prior experience in football.

=== Name change ===
On 2 April 2024, the company announced that it had changed its name from OL Groupe to Eagle Football Group. The new corporate name became officially adopted on 31 March 2024. In 2026, the group is rebranding as OL Groupe.
