= Centre Tola Vologe =

French football club training center

Coordinates: 45.723042°N 4.826667°E

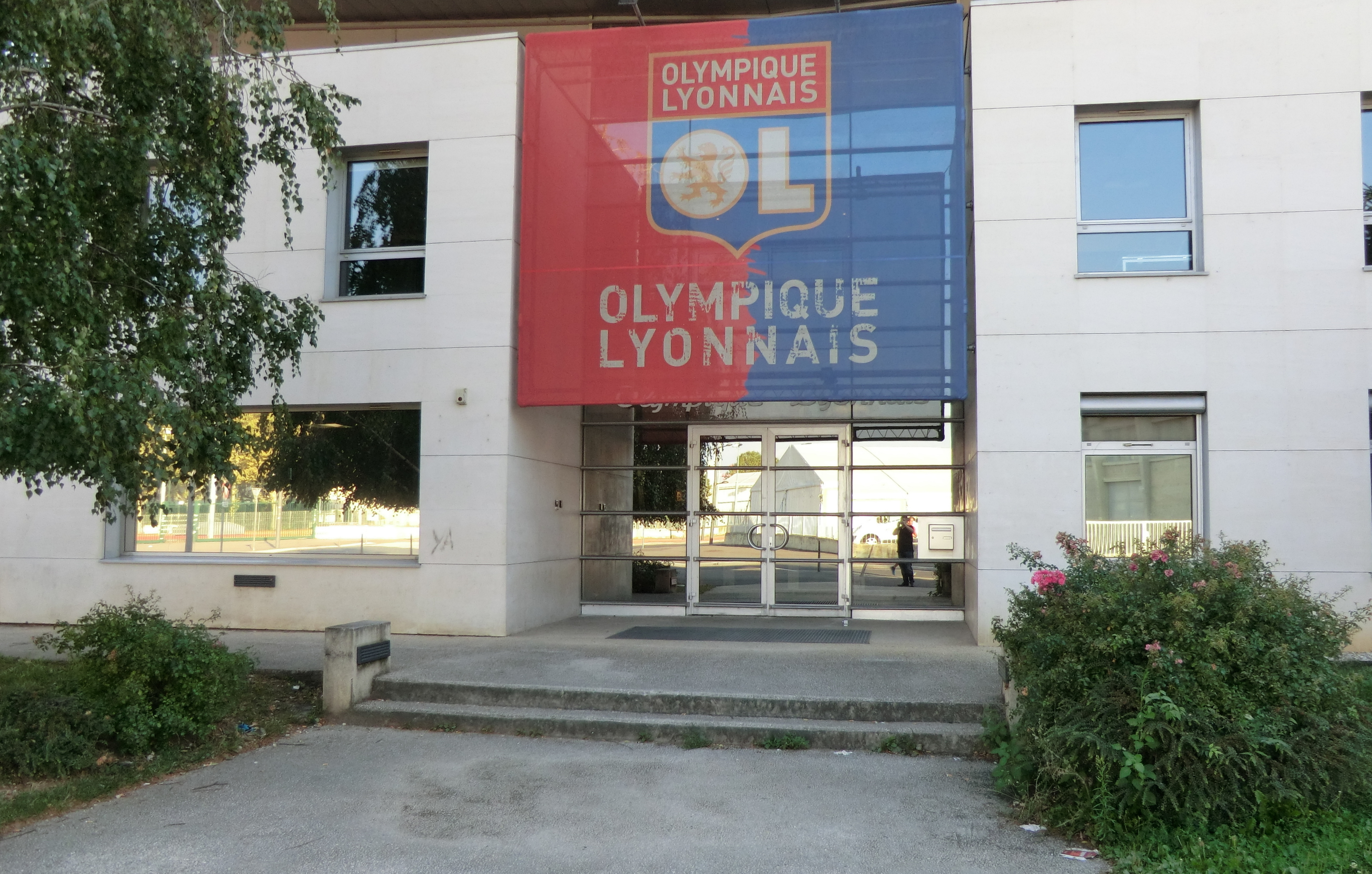
- Main entrance
- Interactive map of Centre Tola Vologe
- Address: Allée Pierre de Coubertin; Lyon, France
- Owner: Olympique Lyonnais 1961-2016
- Type: Football Training Complex

The Centre Tola Vologe was the training center and club headquarters of French football club Olympique Lyonnais. It is located in the city of Lyon, not far from the Stade de Gerland. The facility is named after Anatole Vologe, commonly called Tola Vologe, who was a Lyon sportsmen and was murdered by the Gestapo during World War II. The facility was known for its high-level training and several prominent players have passed through the youth training center. These include Karim Benzema, Hatem Ben Arfa, Sidney Govou, Ludovic Giuly and Loïc Rémy. The center was home to Olympique Lyonnais from 1961 to 2016, when the club moved to the newly built Groupama Stadium in Décines-Charpieu and its nearby training complex. The Youth Academy also moved on to a new complex in the town of Meyzieu.

== Youth training and development ==
The Centre Tola Vologe serves as the home of several top players from the Rhône-Alpes region, who begin daily and more serious training sessions as soon as they reach the age of 14 in order to predict the sporting future of the students, as well as their psychological development. While training at the Tola Vologe, young players are also subject to educational requirements, which include attending Saint-Louis-Saint-Bruno College, a local school, followed by attending the Frédéric Faÿs Lycée, a college in nearby Villeurbanne, where the players can earn their Baccalauréat.

== Staff ==
Position	Staff
Director	
Education Director	

Last updated: 31 May 2019
Source: []
