= Olympique Lyonnais =

Association football club in France

Lyon
- Full name: Olympique Lyonnais
- Nickname: Les Gones (The Kids)
- Short name: Lyon; OL
- Founded: 26 May 1950; 76 years ago
- Stadium: Parc Olympique Lyonnais
- Capacity: 59,186
- Owner: OL Groupe
- President: Michele Kang
- Head coach: Carlos Vicens
- League: Ligue 1
- 2025–26: Ligue 1, 4th of 18
- Website: OL.fr
Home colours	Away colours	Third colours

Olympique Lyonnais (French: Olympique lyonnais; French pronunciation: [ɔlɛ̃pik ljɔnɛ]), commonly referred to as simply Lyon (French pronunciation: [ljɔ̃]) or OL, is a men's professional football club based in Lyon, Auvergne-Rhône-Alpes, France. With origins dating back to 1899, they were founded in 1950.

The club currently competes in Ligue 1, the top division of French football. They play their home matches at the 59,186-capacity Parc Olympique Lyonnais, commercially known as the Groupama Stadium, in Décines-Charpieu, a suburb in the Metropolis of Lyon. The club's home colours are white, red and blue. Lyon was a member of the G14 group of leading European football clubs and are founder members of its successor, the European Club Association.

The club won its first Ligue 1 championship in 2002, beginning a national record-setting streak of seven successive titles. Lyon has also won eight Trophées des Champions, five Coupes de France, and three Ligue 2 titles. On a European level, the team has participated in the UEFA Champions League seventeen times, reaching the semi-final of the competition during the 2009–10 season and the 2019–20 season, and have made it to the quarterfinals in three other occasions. They have also qualified for the Europa League numerous times, making it as far as the semi-final during the 2016–17 season.

The club's nickname, Les Gones, translates to "The Kids" in Lyon's regional dialect of Franco-Provençal. They have a long-standing rivalry with nearby team Saint-Étienne, against whom they contest Le Derby. Lyon was owned by French businessman Jean-Michel Aulas from June 1987 until it was purchased by American businessman John Textor in December 2022. Michele Kang was eventually announced president of the club in June 2025 following Textor's resignation from his leadership position due to the poor financial state of Lyon.

== History ==
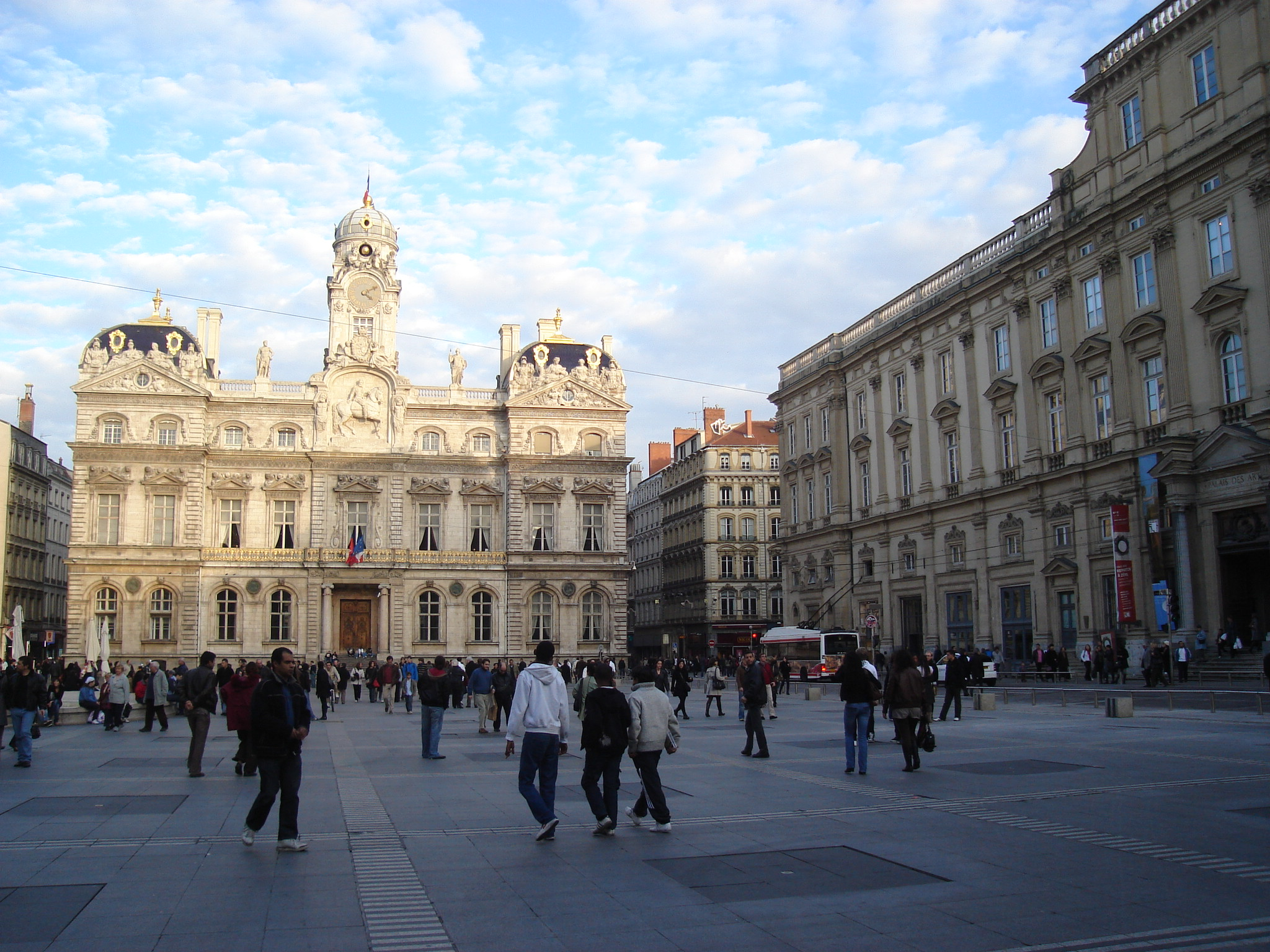
Place des Terreaux was the place of celebration of honors of Olympique Lyonnais.

Origin (1899–1950)

In 1899, a football club named Olympique de Lyon was formed within the multi-sport club, Lyon Olympique Universitaire, originally formed in 1896 as Racing Club de Lyon. During the early years of the club, the football section was often overshadowed by then-local rivals, FC Lyon. Following numerous internal disagreements regarding the cohabitation of amateurs and professionals within the club, then-manager of the club Félix Louot and his entourage contemplated forming their own club.

Following months of meetings, Louot's plans came to fruition when a final meeting of around twenty people took place on 23 May 1950 in Café Neuf in the city's main square, Place Bellecour. During this meeting, the name Olympique Lyonnais was decided for the new club, as well as the club's colours of red and blue. Among the twenty people were Albert Trillat, credited with the club's name and colours, as well as Armand Groslevin, who would become the club's first president. Days later on 26 May, Lyon-based newspaper, Le Progrès reported that the club had officially been formed.

=== Early success (1950–1987) ===
On 27 August 1950, the club played its first official match under manager Oscar Heisserer, defeating CA Paris-Charenton 3–0 in front of 3,000 supporters, with Lyon's first goal being scored within the first forty seconds of the match. The majority of the players in Lyon's squad had previously played for Lyon Olympique Universitaire. In just the club's second year of existence, Lyon were crowned champions of Division 2 during the 1950–51 season, securing promotion to Division 1 for the 1951–52 season. The club maintained its place in Division 1 for the remainder of the decade, excluding a year's stint in Division 2 for the 1953–54 season.

Lyon achieved moderate success during the 1960s and 1970s with the likes of Fleury Di Nallo, Néstor Combin, Serge Chiesa, Bernard Lacombe and Jean Djorkaeff playing major roles. Under manager Lucien Jasseron, Lyon won its first-ever Coupe de France title defeating Bordeaux 2–0 during the 1963–64 season. The club also performed respectably in the league under Jasseron's reign until the 1965–66 season, when Lyon finished 16th, which ultimately led to Jasseron's departure. His replacement was Louis Hon, who helped Lyon win their second Coupe de France title after defeating Sochaux 3–1 during the 1966–67 season. Lyon was managed by former Lyon legend Aimé Mignot heading into the 1970s. Under Mignot's helm, Lyon won its third Coupe de France title during the 1972–73 season, beating Nantes 2–1.

=== Jean-Michel Aulas' presidency (1987–2023) ===
In June 1987, Lyon was bought by local Rhône-based businessman, Jean-Michel Aulas who took control of the club aiming to turn Lyon into an established Division 1 side. His ambitious plan, titled OL – Europe, was designed to develop the club at a European level and back into the first division within a period of no more than four years. The first manager under the new hierarchy was Raymond Domenech. The aspiring chairman gave Domenech carte blanche to recruit whoever he saw fit to help the team reach the first division. They went on to accomplish this in Domenech's first season in charge, qualifying for the UEFA Cup. For the remainder of his tenure, however, the club underachieved. Domenech was replaced by former French international Jean Tigana, who led the team to an impressive second place in the 1994–95 season.

At the start of the new millennium, Lyon began to achieve greater success in French football. The club established itself as the premiere club in France, becoming France's richest club. Lyon also became known for developing promising talent who went on to achieve greatness not only in France, but also abroad and internationally. Notable examples include Michael Essien, Florent Malouda, Sidney Govou, Juninho, Cris, Eric Abidal, Mahamadou Diarra, Patrick Müller and Karim Benzema.

Lyon won its first ever Ligue 1 title in 2002, starting a national record-breaking streak of seven successive titles. During that run, the club also won its fourth Coupe de France title in a 1–0 win over Paris Saint-Germain, its first Coupe de la Ligue title and six Trophée des Champions. The club also performed well in UEFA competitions, reaching as far as the quarter-finals on three occasions and the semi-finals in 2010 in the UEFA Champions League. Lyon's streak and consistent dominance of French football came to an end during the 2008–09 season, when it lost the title to Bordeaux. Several years later, during the 2011–12 season, Lyon won their fifth and most recent Coupe de France trophy in a 1–0 victory against Quevilly.

Lyon began investment in sports outside of football, operating an esports team in China, and in 2019 purchased a minority stake in the local ASVEL basketball club, specifically purchasing a 25% interest in ASVEL's men's side and a 10% interest in the women's side. The club later announced in December of the same year that it would buy an 89.5% stake in the U.S. National Women's Soccer League team known at the time as Reign FC. The purchase closed in January 2020 following approval of the NWSL board. Several weeks later, the rebranding of Reign FC as OL Reign was announced.

In the 2019–20 season, Lyon suffered a poor start to the season, and ended the season in seventh place, as the league was cancelled due to the coronavirus outbreak. Lyon also reached the final of the Coupe de la Ligue, however, they eventually lost to Paris Saint-Germain 6–5 on penalties. Ultimately, this meant that Lyon failed to qualify for European competition for the first time in 24 years. In the Champions League, Lyon were more successful, defeating Juventus in the round of 16 and Manchester City in the quarter-final to reach the semi-finals for the first time in 10 years. However, they eventually lost 3–0 in the semi-final to Bayern Munich, eliminating Lyon from the competition. Two seasons later, Lyon competed in the 2021–22 Europa League season, eventually being knocked out of the competition in the quarter-finals by West Ham 4–1 on aggregate.

On 8 May 2023, after 36 years of presidency, Aulas announced he would be stepping down as president of Olympique Lyonnais, having sold the club to American businessman John Textor in December 2022.

=== John Textor's presidency (2023–2025) ===
In December 2022, following months of delays and negotiation, Textor's Eagle Group became majority stakeholders of Lyon, acquiring a 77.49% stake in the club at a valuation of €900 million including debt. At the time of purchase, Textor also owned 100% of both Brazilian club Botafogo and Belgian club RWD Molenbeek, as well as a 45% stake in English club Crystal Palace.

On 16 September 2023, Italian coach Fabio Grosso, who is also a former player of the club, was appointed head of the first team. Eventually, with the club last in the Ligue 1 table, the team's management announced at the end of November 2023 that Grosso had been sacked after being in charge for just seven games. Academy coach Pierre Sage was named as the team's interim coach who led the team to finish in sixth place, qualifying Lyon to compete in the 2024–25 Europa League season having spent the two previous seasons out of European tournaments. In July 2024, Sage's interim status was removed and he was named the new permanent coach. On 27 January 2025, Sage was sacked as Lyon manager and replaced by Portuguese coach Paulo Fonseca days later on 31 January. Fonseca eventually led Lyon to a 6th place finish, qualifying Lyon to play in the 2025–26 Europa League season.

During this period, the club sold its women's team, OL Lyonnes, known at the time as Olympique Lyonnais Féminin as well as the LDLC Arena, a multipurpose arena near Lyon's stadium.

On 24 June 2025, Lyon were administratively relegated to Ligue 2 by the DNCG due to the poor state of the club's finances.

=== Michele Kang's presidency (2025–present) ===
On 30 June 2025, it was announced that OL Lyonnes president and shareholder in OL Groupe, Michele Kang, had been appointed as Chairwoman and CEO of OL Groupe and President of Olympique Lyonnais, with Michael Gerlinger also being appointed Director General after John Textor resigned from his leadership positions. Just over two weeks later, on 9 July 2025, the decision to relegate Lyon due to financial problems was reversed due to actions made by the club, allowing Lyon to compete in both Ligue 1 and the Europa League for the 2025–26 season.

On 23 June 2026, Eagle Bidco, represented by its judicial administrator Cork Gully, reached an agreement with Michele Kang for the acquisition of 87.8% of the capital of Eagle Football Group, the parent company of Olympique Lyonnais. As part of the agreement, Kang committed to buying out the group's main lenders' debt and to injecting up to €71 million (€75 million including transaction costs) into the group, including €31 million upon completion, as part of a wider restructuring aimed at stabilising the club's finances. Three days later, the acquisition was officially completed, making Kang the club's majority owner, while Matthieu Louis-Jean was appointed as Lyon's sporting director.

On 4 November 2026, manager Paulo Fonseca left the club to join Primeira Liga club Sporting CP, a decision Lyon described as "unexpected". Days later on 9 November, Spanish coach Carlos Vicens joined the club on an 18 month contract.

== Ownership and finances ==
Olympique Lyonnais was owned by Rhône businessman Jean-Michel Aulas, who acquired the club on 15 June 1987. He serves as the founder and chief operating officer of CEGID (Compagnie Européenne de Gestion par l'Informatique Décentralisée). After ridding the club of its debt, Aulas restructured the club's management and reorganised the finances and, in a span of two decades, transformed the club from a second division team into one of the richest football clubs in the world. However, Aulas has been lambasted by critics for running the club as if it were a business. During this period, the club's holding company operated on the European Stock Exchange under the name OL Groupe, initialled OLG. Aulas currently serves on the board for the European Club Association, a sports organisation representing football clubs in Europe. He was also the last president of the now-defunct G-14 organisation.

In April 2008, business magazine Forbes ranked Lyon as the thirteenth most valuable football team in the world. The magazine valued the club at $408 million (€275.6M), excluding debt. In February 2009, Lyon were rated in the 12th spot in the Deloitte Football Money League, reportedly bringing in an annual revenue of €155.7 million for the 2007–08 season, which ranks among the world's best football clubs in terms of revenue.

In 2016, a Chinese private equity fund acquired 20% stake in Olympique Lyonnais Group for €100 million. The fund was managed by IDG Capital Partners.

In December 2022, American businessman John Textor completed the purchase of the club, owning 77.49% of the club's shares and thus becomes the new owner of the club. Under this arrangement, the club suggested that Aulas would continue to serve as president for at least three more seasons. However, on 8 May 2023, it was announced that Textor had replaced Aulas to become the chairman and CEO of OL Groupe, thus making him the new president of Olympique Lyonnais, ending Aulas' 36 years rule, during which more than 50 major titles have been won for both men's and women's teams. Jean-Michel Aulas was appointed honorary chairman, and L'Équipe reported that Aulas would be compensated €10 million for his exit and retain a 9% stake in the club.

On 13 July 2023, Frenchman Santiago Cucci was named to become the new interim executive president of OL Groupe, but later resigned in November. He was replaced by Laurent Prud'homme, who remained in the position until May 2025.

Following Lyon's administrative relegation to Ligue 2 in June 2025 by the DNCG, John Textor resigned due to pressure from the club's shareholders. American businesswoman Michele Kang, one of the club's shareholders and the owner of Lyon women's team, was appointed as the new president. In Lyon's appeal hearing with the DNCG on 9 July, represented by Michele Kang and the club's new general director Michael Gerlinger, the club won the appeal, and the DNCG confirmed that Lyon would remain in Ligue 1.

As of 30 June 2025.

Club management

Chairwoman and President	(United States) Michele Kang
General director	(Germany) Michael Gerlinger
Vice general director	(France) Harry Moyal
Managing director	(France) Thierry Sauvage
Sporting director	(France) Matthieu Louis-Jean
Sports advisor	(Brazil) Sonny Anderson
Head of recruitment	(France) Benjamin Charrier
Sporting coordinator	(France) Daniel Congré
Commercial director	(France) Cyrille Groll
Marketing director	(France) Sam Primaut
Office director	(France) Patrick Iliou
Chief of financial and information office	(France) Emmanuelle Sarrabay
Head of media	(France) Pierre Bideau

List of Olympique Lyonnais presidents
President	Tenure
(France) Armand Groslevin	1950–1960
(France) Ferdinand Maillet	1960–1965
(France) Édouard Rochet	1965–1977
(France) Roger Michaux	1977–1981
(France) Jean Perrot	1981–1982
(France) Raymond Ravet	1982–1983
(France) Charles Mighirian	1983–1987
(France) Jean-Michel Aulas	1987–2023
(United States) John Textor	2023–2025
(United States) Michele Kang	2025–present

== Stadium ==
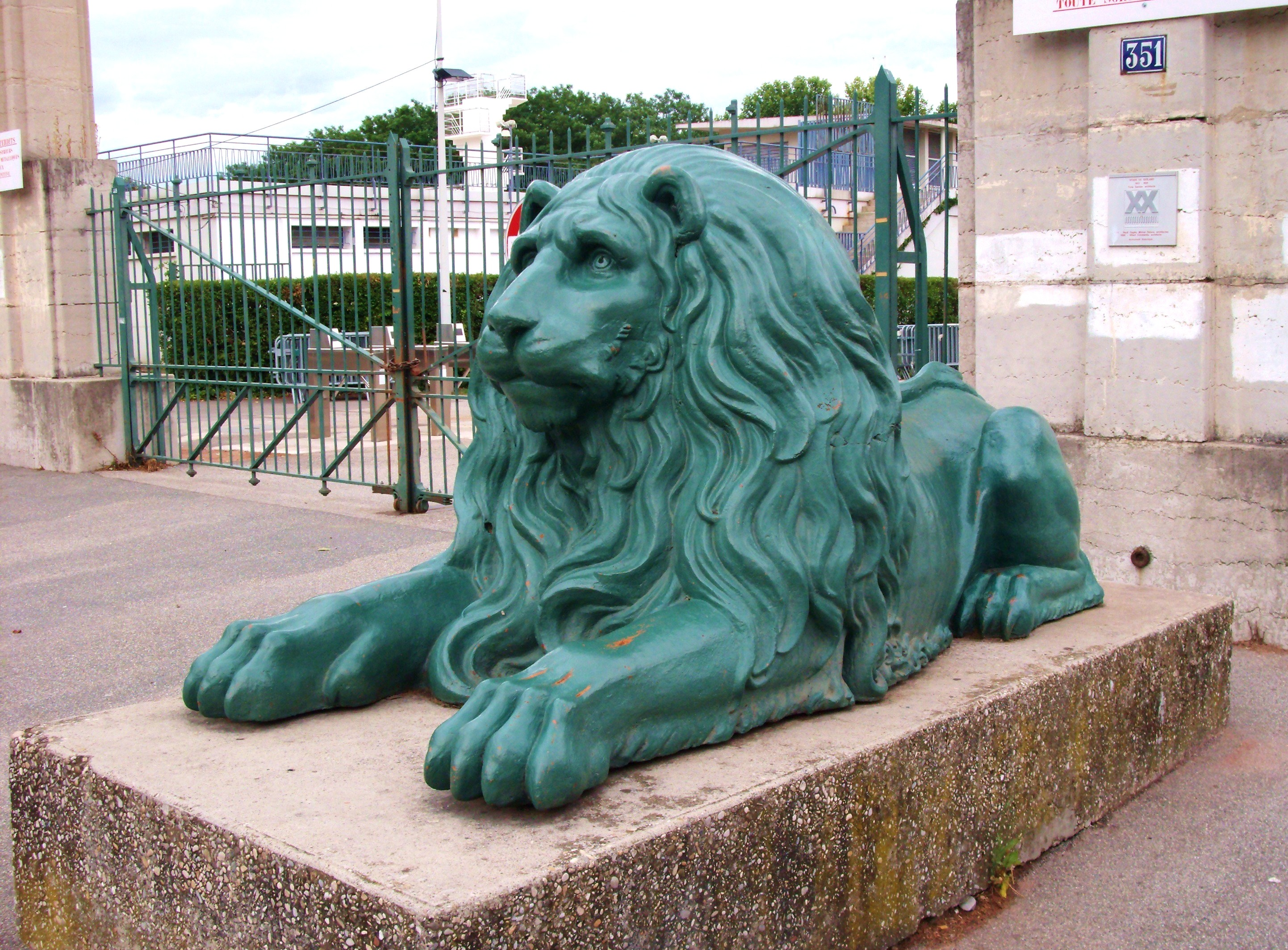
One of the two lions guarding the main entrance to the Stade de Gerland.

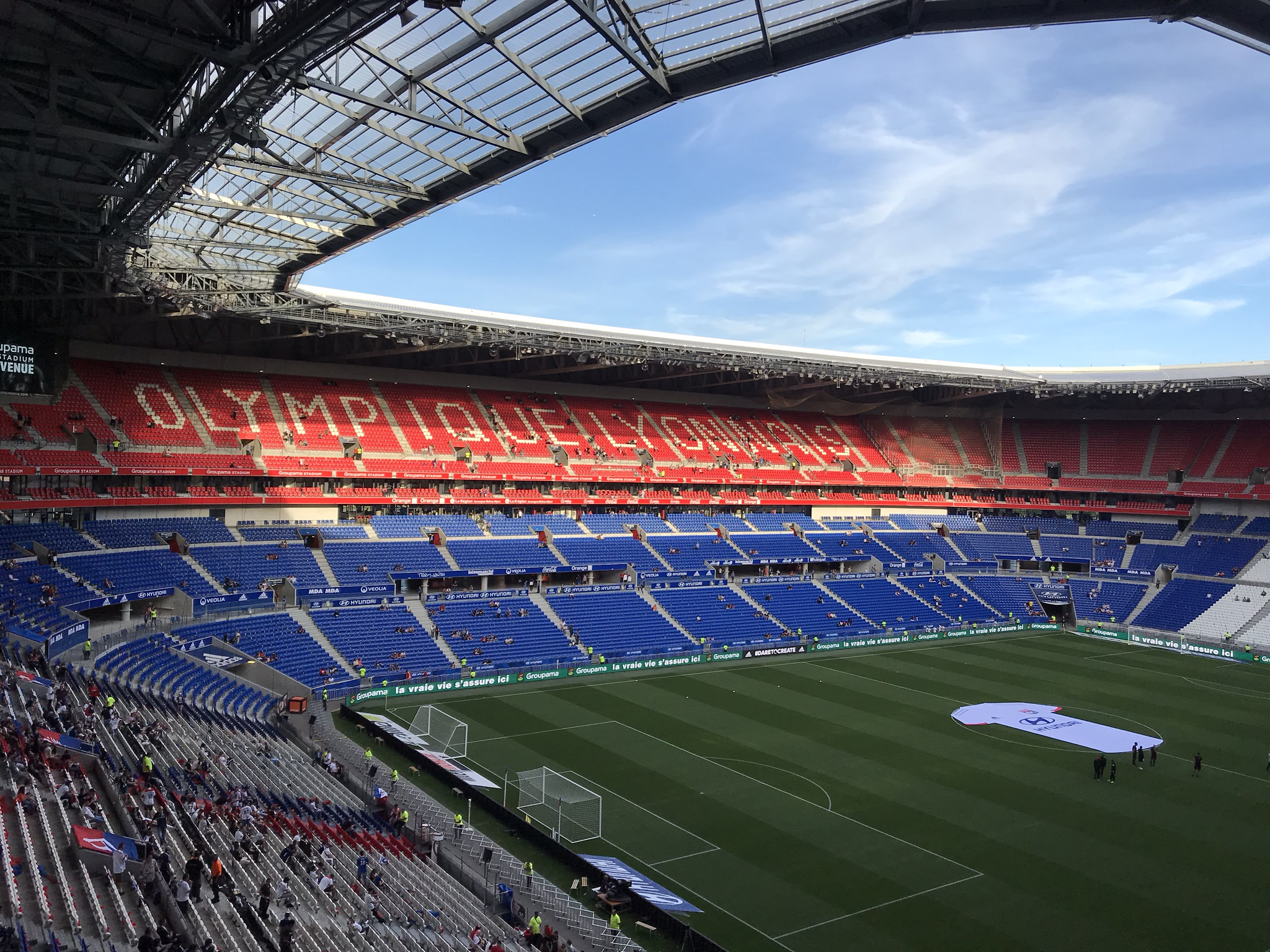
Parc Olympique Lyonnais.

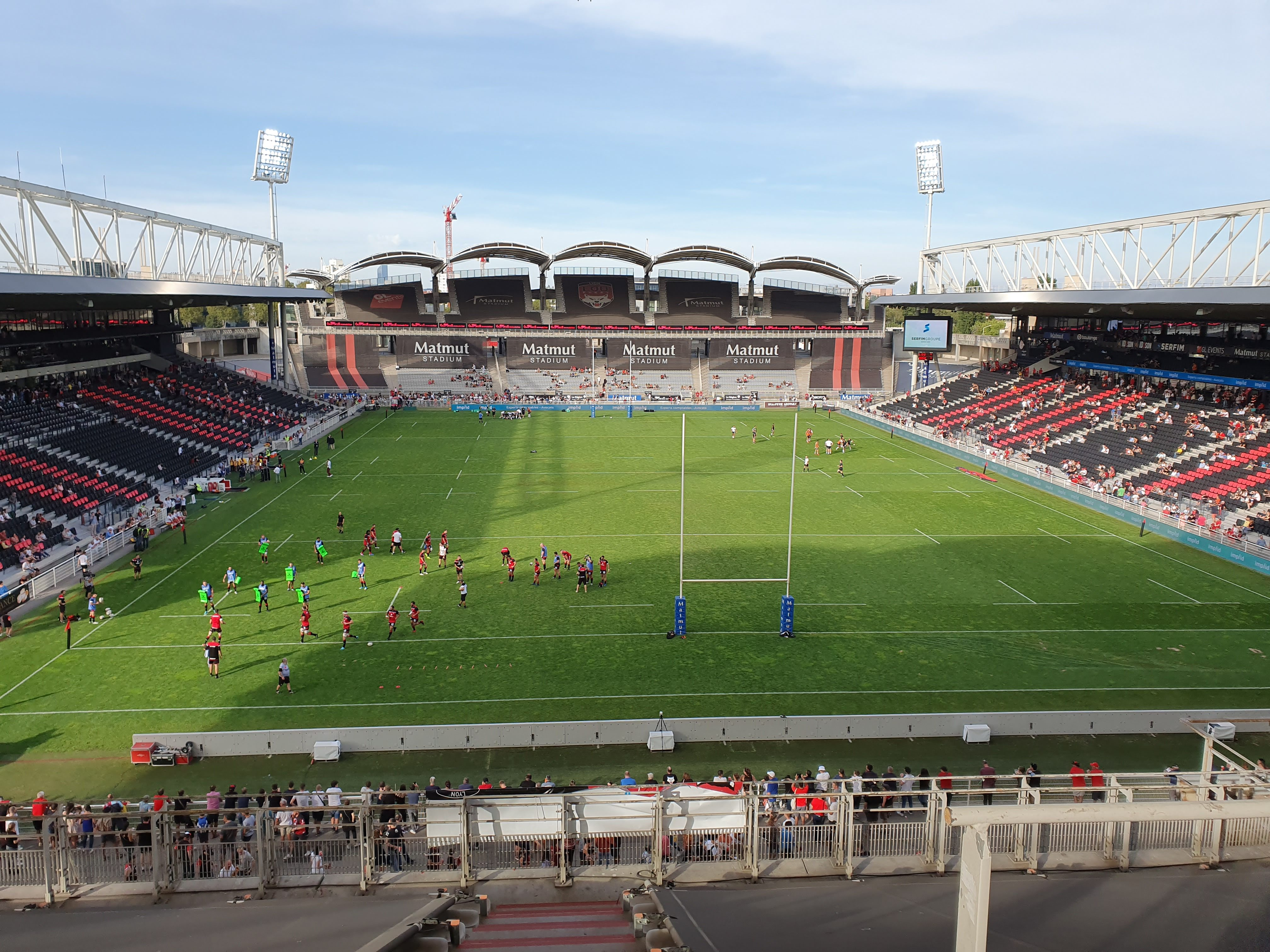
View of the Stade de Gerland.

Stade de Gerland (1950–2015)

Olympique Lyonnais played at the Stade de Gerland between 1950 and 2015. In 1910, the then-mayor of Lyon, Édouard Herriot, wanted to develop and build a sports stadium with both an athletics track and a velodrome in the city. In 1912, the stadium was officially mandated and local architect Tony Garnier was given the reins in designing and constructing it. Construction began in 1914 with the hope that the stadium would be completed before the International Exhibition of 1914. Construction was halted due to the First World War, but construction was eventually completed in 1919. By 1920, the stadium was completely functional.

In 1926, the Stade de Gerland, with a capacity of 35,000, was inaugurated by Herriot. In 1967, the stadium was listed as a Monument historique. As well as hosting Lyon's home games, the stadium hosted matches for the 1984 European Championship, 1998 World Cup and the 2003 Confederations Cup.

The stadium's cycling track was eventually removed to increase the seating capacity to around 50,000. In September 1980, the stadium saw its record attendance of 48,552 during a derby game between Lyon and Saint-Étienne. In 1984, minor renovations were made to the stadium by architect René Gagis. This included construction of the Jean Bouin and Jean Jaurès stands. Further renovations were needed to prepare the stadium for the 1998 FIFA World Cup, as by that time FIFA had mandated that all stadiums used for international matches had to be all-seater. These renovations, planned by architect Albert Constantin, included the Jean Jaurès and Jean Bouin stands being demolished and rebuilt as well as removing the remaining athletics track. This new incarnation of the stadium had a maximum capacity of 40,494.

On 5 December 2015, Lyon played their final game in the Stade de Gerland in a 2–0 defeat against Angers. The stadium is now the home of Lyon OU Rugby and currently holds a capacity of 35,000 spectators.

Parc Olympique Lyonnais (2016–present)

On 1 September 2008, Lyon president Jean-Michel Aulas announced plans to create a new 60,000-seater stadium, tentatively called OL Land, to be built on 50 hectares of land located in Décines-Charpieu, a suburb of Lyon. Over a month later, on 13 October 2008, the project was agreed upon by the State, the General Council of Rhône, the Grand Lyon, SYTRAL and the municipality of Décines-Charpieu for construction with approximately €180 million of public money being used, with between €60–80 million coming from the Urban Community of Lyon. After the announcement, however, the club's efforts to get the stadium off the ground were hindered mainly due to slow administrative procedures, political interests and various opposition groups, who viewed the stadium as financially, ecologically and socially wrong for the taxpayers and community of Décines-Charpieu. The official name of the stadium was provisionally to be Le Stade des Lumières.

On 22 September 2009, French newspaper L'Équipe reported that OL Land had been selected by the French Football Federation (FFF) as one of the 12 stadiums to be used in the country's bidding for UEFA Euro 2016. The FFF officially made their selections on 11 November 2009 and the city of Lyon was selected as a site to host matches during the tournament.

Groundwork began on the project site in October 2012, and the construction of the stadium itself began in November 2013. On 9 January 2016, Lyon played their first game in the Parc Olympique Lyonnais in a 4–1 victory over Troyes, with goals from Lacazette, Ghezzal, Ferri and Beauvue.

Since 2017, Lyon has had a sponsorship partnership with French insurance company Groupama. As a result, the Parc Olympique Lyonnais is currently known as the Groupama Stadium, with the club having renewed the partnership in 2020, 2022 and 2025. As of 2025, the partnership is estimated to be worth €6.9 million a year.

The current record attendance at the Parc Olympique Lyonnais is 58,257 which was achieved on 9 November 2025 during a Ligue 1 fixture against Paris Saint-Germain.

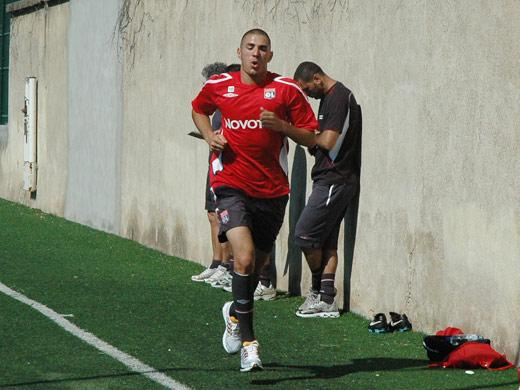
Former Lyon player Karim Benzema training at the Centre Tola Vologe.

== Training centre ==
The Centre Tola Vologe was the training centre and club headquarters of Olympique Lyonnais before the move to their new stadium in 2016. It is located in the city of Lyon, not far from the Stade de Gerland. The facility is named after Anatole Vologe, commonly called Tola Vologe, who was a Lyon sportsman and was murdered by the Gestapo during World War II. The facility is known for its high-level training and several prominent players have passed through the youth training centre. These include Karim Benzema, Hatem Ben Arfa, Sidney Govou, Alexandre Lacazette, Samuel Umtiti and Ludovic Giuly. The centre used to host training sessions for the senior team and also served as the home facility for the club's reserve, youth (both male and female), and female sides, who both played their home matches at the Plaine des Jeux de Gerland. Jean-François Vulliez is the current director of the centre.

Both the men and women teams now train within a modern complex right by the new Groupama Stadium in Décines. The youth Academy also moved to the neighbouring town of Meyzieu.

== Colours and kits ==
Lyon won six of their seven league titles wearing this kit.

Since the club's foundation, the primary colours have been red, blue, and white, with the latter being the most predominant of the three. During the early years of the club's existence, Olympique Lyonnais primarily played in all-white uniforms. In 1955, Lyon officials decided to add a red and blue chevron and blue shorts to the combination. In 1961, the chevron tradition was disbanded and the two strips of red and blue were shaped horizontally. After six years, the club returned to the all-white uniforms, but kept intact the red and blue stripes, but, instead of keeping them horizontally, inserted them vertically and on the left side of the shirt. Lyon began wearing the shirt during the 1970–71 season and wore the kits up until the 1975–76 season. For the 2002–03 season, chairman Jean-Michel Aulas announced that the club would return the kits. Lyon wore them, with several different modifications every year, for six of their seven consecutive titles.

In 1976, the club endured a drastic change to their kits, ditching the all-white uniforms for an all-red style, akin to English club Liverpool. The club wore the kits up until the 1989–90 season, with the 1977–78 and 1978–79 seasons being excluded due to the club adding navy blue vertical stripes to the shirt that was deemed unsuccessful. Following the 1989–90 season, the club returned to the all-white kits and, at the start of the 1995–96 season, the club returned the vertical stripes, but opted to insert them in the center of the shirt, instead of to the left. The club kept this style until the 2001–02 season. For the 2009–10 season, Lyon returned the horizontal red and blue stripes. In the Champions League, Lyon has used a variety of different colours as first choice, including red, navy blue, light blue, black, silver and fluorescent yellow.

== Supporters ==
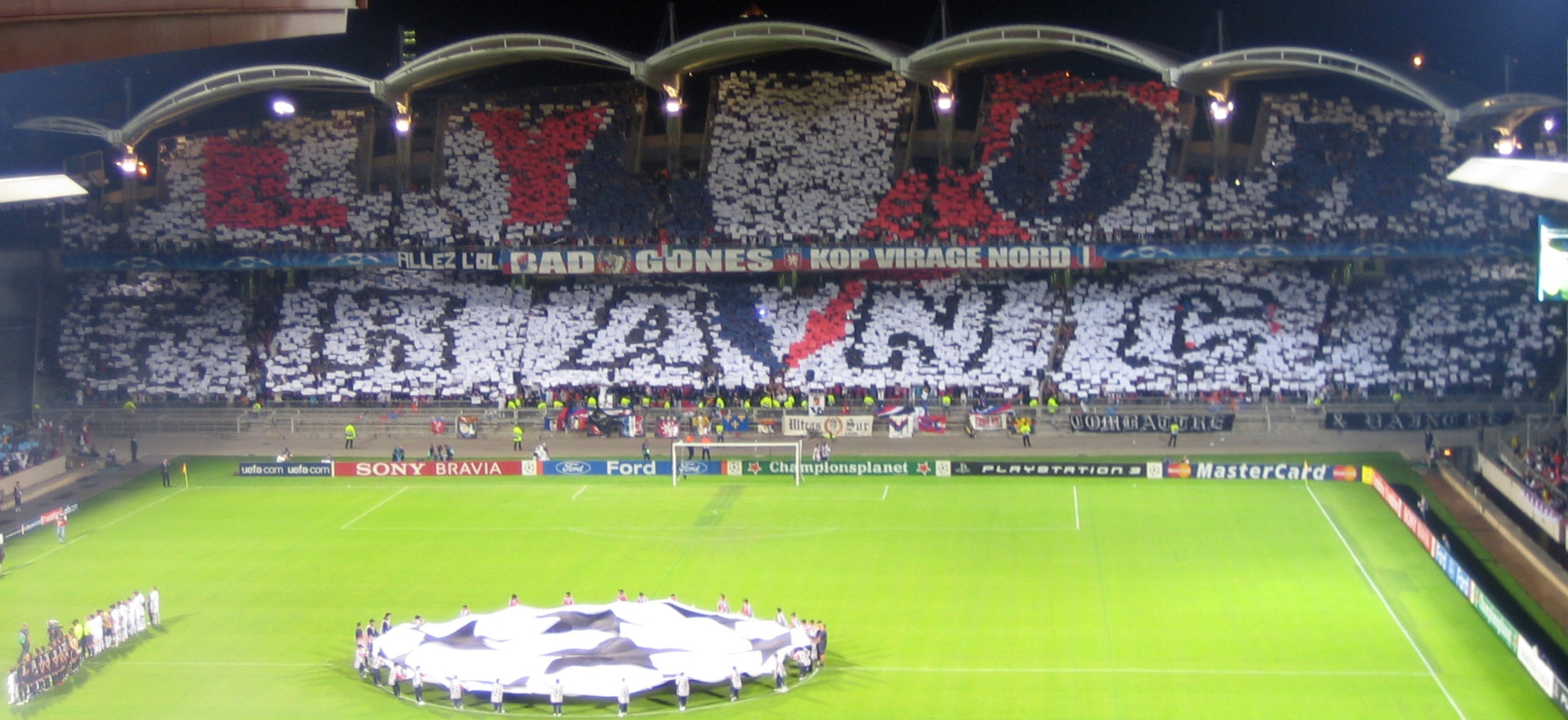
Tribune of Bad Gones before the match Olympique Lyonnais – Real Madrid in 2006.

Olympique Lyonnais has an active fanbase composed of many groups of supporters. One of the club's most notable supporters group is Bad Gones ("Bad Kids"). The Bad Gones were established in 1987 around the time of Jean-Michel Aulas's purchase of the team and used to occupy the Virage Nord area of the Stade de Gerland, and currently occupy the Virage Nord area of the Parc Olympique Lyonnais. During the 2007–08 season, the group celebrated its 20th anniversary. The Bad Gones is the biggest group of supporters in France and have a very strong reputation in Europe, due to the club's control of Ligue 1, as well as Lyon's continued appearances in the UEFA Champions League.

Another notable supporters group is the Cosa Nostra Lyon, who occupy the Virage Sud area of the stadium. The group was created in 2007 as a result of a merger between two groups, the Lugdunums, which had existed since 1993 and Nucleo Ultra, which formed in 2000. The merger was created to achieve a sense of stability among supporters. The group is no longer recognised by the club, but continues to operate in a functional manner. Other support groups include the Hex@gones, which was formed in 2000 and sit in the Virage Sud area, the Gastrogones, who occupy the Jean Bouin stand, and the O'Elles Club, who sit in the Jean Jaurès stand.

The club also has support groups that are based in areas outside of the city of Lyon. The Gones 58 supporters come from the department of Nièvre in Bourgogne, while Gones 26 origins come from the department of Drôme in nearby Valence. Three minor support groups in Septimagones, Loups Marchois, and Dauphigones comes from the commune of Hérépian, the department of Creuse, and the department of Isère, respectively. Outside of France, the Lyondoners are based in London and follow Lyon at home, away and internationally.

=== Hooliganism, far-right and racist incidents ===
Olympique Lyonnais has been repeatedly associated with some of the most serious episodes of fan violence and discriminatory behaviour in French football, a record that has drawn condemnation from club officials, governing bodies, and national politicians alike.

Issues amongst club supporters are traceable to the late 1980s and the founding of the Bad Gones ultras group in 1987, whose early members openly displayed white supremacist imagery, including a Celtic cross symbol on one of the group's first scarves, and who were known at the time for racist and antisemitic acts.

In December 2008, three and a half hours before a Ligue 1 match between Lyon and Marseille, around a dozen supporters from each side met for a planned confrontation near the Ninkasi bar close to the Gerland stadium, before a group of around fifty people led by a figure from the Cosa Nostra supporters' group attempted to provoke further clashes outside the ground. A fight later broke out inside the stadium's south stand, resulting in two arrests, one of whom was found to be carrying a knife.

As of the start of 2009, Olympique Lyonnais had 18 active stadium bans, and was listed in a 2007 Senate information report alongside clubs including Saint-Etienne, Nice, Marseille, Paris, Lille, and Bordeaux as having "permanent overflows" of supporter violence, despite the club's public position that the level of violence at the Gerland was among the lowest in France. Police at the time estimated that approximately fifty members of the Cosa Nostra group could be classified as hooligans. One Cosa Nostra member was arrested and convicted during a derby against Saint-Etienne for wearing a jersey bearing the text "Adolf 88" and waving a flag associated with Italian fascism.

==== 2010s ====
In April 2010, the French Ministry of the Interior ordered the dissolution of seven French supporter groups for violence, among them the Cosa Nostra Lyon.

In 2011, several members of the Mezza Lyon hooligan group, which regularly frequented the south stand of the Groupama Stadium, vandalised and spray-painted neo-Nazi slogans on the premises of Magic Fans, a supporters' group of rival club AS Saint-Etienne.

In April 2017, crowd disorder marred Lyon's Europa League quarter-final against Besiktas at the Parc OL. Around twenty minutes before kick-off, Lyon supporters spilt onto the pitch for their own safety as fireworks were set off and projectiles were thrown from an upper section housing the visiting supporters, delaying the game by 45 minutes. Lyon's director of security stated that around fifty Turkish fans had forced their way into the stadium. However, some Lyon supporters also sought confrontations with their Turkish counterparts outside and inside the ground. The incident resulted in Lyon receiving a suspended two-year ban from European competition.

In March 2018, up to 150 hooded Lyon supporters launched a premeditated attack on an anti-terrorist police unit outside the Groupama Stadium before the Europa League tie against CSKA Moscow, leaving at least eight officers injured. The club condemned the attacks as "intolerable and premeditated" and acknowledged they were "detrimental" to the club, while pledging to work with police to identify those responsible. UEFA subsequently charged Lyon over racist behaviour, with a French sports publication reporting that the charges related to Nazi symbols displayed inside the stadium, Nazi salutes, and an attack on a non-white spectator, all while the club's suspended European ban remained in place.

In September 2018, flyers were distributed among supporters in the Groupama Stadium's north end claiming that Marseille was "a city where AIDS reigns". Club president Jean-Michel Aulas called the material "ridiculous and odious" and consulted lawyers, though the club ultimately concluded it could not be legally prosecuted. That same month, a Lyon supporter was caught on camera making a Nazi salute during the Champions League game at Manchester City. The club announced it would seek to ban the individual for life. Greater Manchester Police described the behaviour as "absolutely abhorrent" and opened a hate crime investigation.

==== 2020s ====
In December 2021, Lyon supporters fought with rival fans and threw flares during a French Cup tie against Paris FC at the Charlety stadium, causing the match to be abandoned at half-time.

During the abandoned Marseille-Lyon Ligue 1 match in October 2023, Lyon fans in the stands were filmed making Nazi gestures and mimicking monkeys while awaiting the resumption of play. Lyon condemned what it called "the unacceptable racist behaviour of individuals in the stands" and sought CCTV footage to identify those responsible.

In May 2024, over 200 Lyon and Paris Saint-Germain FC supporters clashed on a motorway ahead of the French Cup final near Lille, leaving 30 people injured, one bus burned, and two others damaged. Eight police officers sustained injuries in that incident, despite fan buses from both clubs being escorted by police.

In October 2024, clashes broke out between two separate groups of Lyon supporters during a home match against Nantes at Groupama Stadium, with local media reporting that one supporter was stabbed in the thigh. Lyon's director general Laurent Prud'homme stated that "violence of any kind has no place at OL".

After Lyon were knocked out of the Coupe de France by fifth-tier FC Bourgoin-Jallieu in January 2025, supporters reacted violently, and witnesses reported racist abuse directed at the opposing club's supporters. Prud'homme stated that such incidents "should no longer tarnish OL's image," an acknowledgement that the problem was systemic rather than isolated.

The record of the fanbase became a political issue in early 2026, when Aulas entered the 2026 Lyon municipal election. During a televised debate, he was challenged over accusations that he had tolerated violent and fascist individuals within Lyon's ultra groups during his time in charge, allegations he denied.

== Statistics and records ==
Player	Matches
(France) Serge Chiesa	542
(France) Grégory Coupet	519
(France) Fleury Di Nallo	494
(France) Yves Chauveau	490
(Portugal) Anthony Lopes	489
(France) Aimé Mignot	425
(France) Sidney Govou	412
(France) Anthony Réveillère	400
Player	Goals
(France) Fleury Di Nallo	222
(France) Alexandre Lacazette	201
(France) Bernard Lacombe	149
(France) Serge Chiesa	132
(Brazil) Juninho	100
(France) Bafétimbi Gomis	95
(Brazil) Sonny Anderson	94
(France) Nestor Combin	94

Lyon's first competitive game was a 3–0 victory against CA Paris-Charenton on 26 August 1950. Since the club's foundation in 1950, they have played over 50 seasons in France's highest football division, playing over 1,800 matches. Of the nine seasons the club played in Ligue 2, they contested 310 matches. Lyon achieved their 1,000th victory during the 2003–04 season after defeating Strasbourg.

The Moroccan-born French midfielder Serge Chiesa holds Lyon overall appearance record having played in 541 matches over the course of 14 seasons from 1969 to 1983. Following him is former goalkeeper Grégory Coupet who contested 518 matches over the course of 11 seasons from 1997 to 2008. Along with Sidney Govou, Coupet also has the distinction of being the only player in Lyon's history to win all four domestic French titles having been a part of all seven Ligue 1 titles, the club's Coupe de France triumph in 2008, the only Coupe de la Ligue win in 2001, and six of the seven Trophée des Champions titles. Govou, Coupet, and Juninho share the honour of being only Lyon players who were a part of all seven title runs.

The club's all-time leading scorer is Fleury Di Nallo, who scored 222 goals while at the club from 1960 to 1974. Di Nallo is also third behind Chiesa and Coupet in all time appearances having played in 489 matches during his 14-year stint at the club. Despite Di Nallo's impressive goalscoring record, he doesn't hold the record for most goals scored during a league season. That distinction was held by Bourg-en-Bresse-born André Guy who notched 25 goals, which he attained in the 1968–69 season. Alexandre Lacazette, however, scored his 26th goal of the 2014–15 league season in an important game away to Stade de Reims when he scored in the sixth minute.

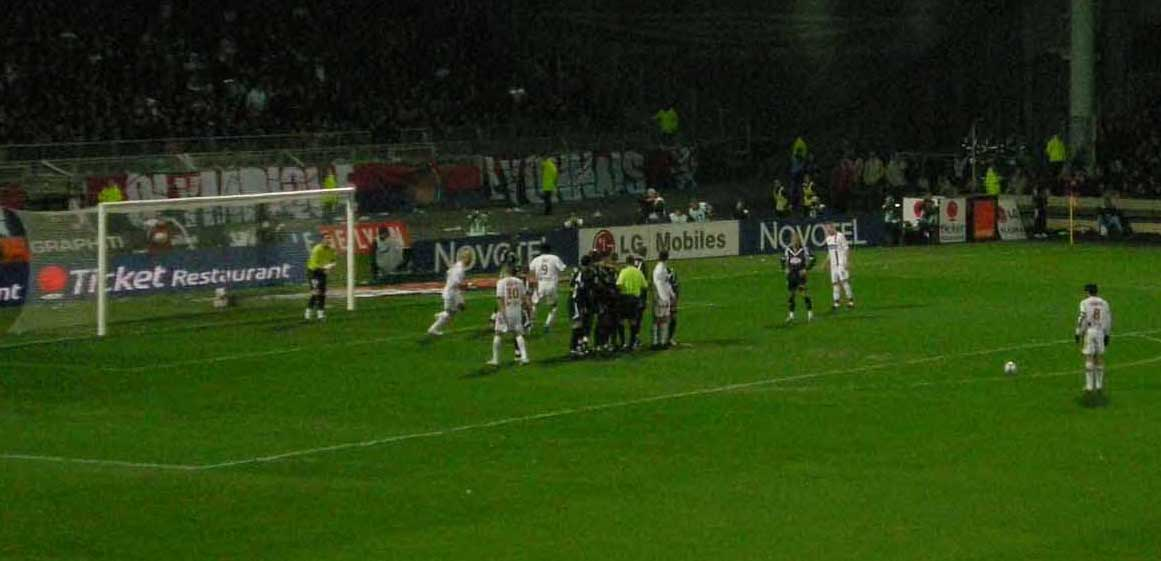
Juninho converted a record 44 free kicks at Lyon

Lyon's biggest victory is 10–0, which occurred of two occasions against Ajaccio during the 1953–54 edition of the Coupe de France and, two seasons later, against Delle during the 1955–56 edition of the competition. Lyon's biggest league victory is 8–0 and also occurred on two occasions. The first being during the 1966–67 season against Angers, and the second being against Marseille during the 1997–98 season. The club's biggest victory on the European stage occurred during the 1974–75 season, where Lyon hammered Luxembourg-based club FA Red Boys Differdange 7–0.

== Rivalries ==
Historically, Lyon has had a healthy rivalry with Saint-Étienne, head-to-head clashes between the clubs being referred to as the Derby rhônalpin. Since the club's dominance at the start of the new millennium, however, they have established rivalries with Marseille, Bordeaux, Paris Saint-Germain and Lille. Lyon also share minor rivalries with fellow Rhône-Alpes clubs Grenoble and AS Lyon Duchère.

The Saint-Étienne rivalry began during the 1960s when Lyon established their residency in the French first division. The Arpitan rivalry stems simply from the close proximity of the clubs to each other, separated by just 61 kilometres (38 mi), as well as historical social and cultural difference between the two cities where they are based; Lyon traditionally cited as being a financially comfortable and middle class city, while Saint-Étienne is traditionally regarded as being more industrial and working-class. The derby also pits "the most recently successful French club" (Lyon) against "the formerly biggest French club" (Saint-Étienne) and is often seen as one of the high points of the Ligue 1 season.

Lyon's rivalry with Marseille goes back to 23 September 1945, when the clubs contested their first match. The derby, often called Choc des Olympiques ("Clash of the Olympics") or Olympico, is often cited as being particularly important as both clubs are of high standard in French football and the championship is regularly decided between the two. Marseille, Saint-Étienne, Lyon, and PSG are the only French clubs to have won the French first division four straight times.

== Sponsors ==
On 7 August 2009, Lyon announced that it signed a ten-year deal with the German sportswear brand Adidas, effective at the start of the 2010–11 season with Lyon earning €5 million annually from the deal, plus possible royalty fees based on product sales. As of the 2024–25 season, Lyon still have a deal with Adidas which will last until the end of the 2028–29 season.

Following the 2008–09 season, Lyon's long-term sponsorship agreement with the French multinational corporation Accor and Lyon-based Renault Trucks ended. On 22 July 2009, the Paris-based online bookmaker BetClic reached an agreement with Lyon to advertise on the club's kits. However, due to French law prohibiting online gambling, Lyon could not wear its kits displaying the logo. On 12 August 2009, just before the opening league match against Le Mans, the club was relieved of its BetClic-sponsored shirts by the Ligue de Football Professionnel (LFP), which warned the club that it risked forfeiting points if the club wore them. Lyon complied and, since the Le Mans match, wore sponsorless shirts while playing on French soil. Lyon were free to wear its BetClic sponsored shirts outside France; on 25 August 2009, the club unveiled the shirts in Belgium while taking on Anderlecht in the Champions League. On 15 January 2010, Lyon secured a sponsorship agreement with Japanese video game company Sony Computer Entertainment to display the company's PlayStation logo on their shirts. The deal lasted until the end of the 2009–10 season. In 2010, the French ban on online gambling advertising was lifted and Lyon began wearing its BetClic-sponsored shirts on French soil. In August 2012, the club agreed a two-year sponsorship deal with Korean car manufacturers Hyundai that would start in 2012–13 season, replacing BetClic as the main sponsor in their shirts for Ligue 1 matches.

Lyon have been sponsored by Emirates since 2020.

== Media ==
On 27 July 2005, the club launched the 24/7 network OLTV, which is completely devoted to club programming and events, along with reserve and women's team matches. OLTV was renamed to OL Play in 2021.

== Kit manufacturers and shirt sponsors ==
Period	Kit manufacturer
1950–1964	In-House
1964–1978	Le Coq Sportif
1978–1980	Pony
1980–1985	Puma
1985–1991	Duarig
1991–1995	Nike
1995–2002	Adidas
2002–2010	Umbro
2010–Present	Adidas

Period	Shirt sponsor
1968–1969	Vittel
1972–1973	Chemise Club/ Perrier
1973–1973	Mister West/ Perrier
1974–1975	Carrefour
1975–1976	Jelmoli/ RTL/ Perrier
1976–1977	Banga
1977–1980	RTL
1980–1986	Carrefour
1986–1987	Carrefour/ Europe 1
1987–1988	Europe 1/ Giraudy Affichage
1988–1989	Noirclerc/ Le69
1989–1990	Faure/ Le69
1990–1991	Candia
1991–1992	Zenith Data Systems/ Canal+/ Candia
1992–1993	Zenith Data Systems/ Canal+
1993–1995	Justin Bridou/ Sodexho
1995–1996	Justin Bridou/ Aoste
1996–1997	Sodexho
1997–1999	Vediorbis
1999–2000	Pathé
2000–2001	Pathé/ Infogrames
2001–2002	Renault/ Continental/ Atari
2002–2004	Renault Trucks/ Continental
2004–2006	Renault Trucks/ LG
2006–2009	Novotel/ Ticket Restaurant
2009–2010	Playstation 3/ Kool Shen/ BetClic
2010–2011	BetClic/ Everest Poker
2011–2012	Everest Poker/ Veolia
2012–2020	Hyundai/ Veolia
2020–Present	Emirates

== UEFA club coefficient ranking ==
Lyon's highest UEFA club ranking was 8th place during the 2007–08 season.

As of 11 July 2026.

Rank	Team	Points
29	(France) Lille	68.750
30	(Italy) AC Milan	66.000
31	(France) Olympique Lyonnais	65.750
32	(Norway) Bodø/Glimt	64.000
33	(Portugal) Braga	63.750

== Players ==
=== Current squad ===
As of 8 September 2026

Note: Flags indicate national team as defined under FIFA eligibility rules; some limited exceptions apply. Players may hold more than one non-FIFA nationality.

No.	Pos.	Nation	Player
1	GK	SVK	Dominik Greif
2	MF	DEN	Mads Bidstrup
3	DF	ARG	Nicolás Tagliafico (4th captain)
6	MF	USA	Tanner Tessmann
7	FW	GHA	Ernest Nuamah
8	MF	FRA	Corentin Tolisso (captain)
10	MF	CZE	Pavel Šulc
11	FW	JPN	Keito Nakamura
13	DF	SUI	Zachary Athekame (on loan from AC Milan)
16	DF	BRA	Abner
17	FW	BEL	Loïs Openda (on loan from Juventus)
18	MF	FRA	Khalis Merah
19	DF	SEN	Moussa Niakhaté (vice-captain)

No.	Pos.	Nation	Player
20	DF	AUT	Felix Bacher
21	DF	NED	Ruben Kluivert
22	DF	ANG	Clinton Mata (3rd captain)
23	MF	ENG	Tyler Morton
24	FW	BEL	Julien Duranville
25	GK	FRA	Justin Bengui
26	FW	ALG	Kaïl Boudache
40	GK	FRA	Rémy Descamps
45	FW	FRA	Rémi Himbert
50	GK	MLI	Lassine Diarra
76	DF	BFA	Mohamed Ouédraogo
85	DF	FRA	Noham Kamara
99	MF	DEN	Noah Nartey

=== Lyon Reserves and Academy ===
The following players have been called-up to Lyon squad for any official competition match, and some have officially debuted. They are those who have been promoted from the reserves team squad and youth sector squads also, with whom they regularly play for. The listed numbers are those being officially assigned to players who are taking part during the current season.

Note: Flags indicate national team as defined under FIFA eligibility rules; some limited exceptions apply. Players may hold more than one non-FIFA nationality.

No.	Pos.	Nation	Player
4	MF	CIV	Paul Akouokou
30	GK	CIV	Yvann Konan
32	FW	ENG	Alejandro Gomes Rodríguez
33	MF	COD	Cluver Sambi Mbungu
35	GK	POR	Matthias Da Silva

No.	Pos.	Nation	Player
37	DF	FRA	Steeve Kango
38	DF	FRA	Angel García
41	DF	FRA	Melvyn Otobo
44	FW	FRA	Adil Hamdani
46	MF	POR	Tiago Gonçalves

=== Out on loan ===
Note: Flags indicate national team as defined under FIFA eligibility rules; some limited exceptions apply. Players may hold more than one non-FIFA nationality.

No.	Pos.	Nation	Player
—	GK	USA	Matt Turner (at (United States) New England Revolution until 31 December 2026)
—	MF	FRA	Mahamadou Diawara (at Red Star until 30 June 2027)
—	MF	BEL	Orel Mangala (at (Spain) Getafe until 30 June 2027)

No.	Pos.	Nation	Player
—	FW	ALG	Daryll Benlahlou (at Montpellier until 30 June 2027)
—	FW	FRA	Enzo Molebe (at (Switzerland) Lausanne-Sport until 30 June 2027)

=== Former players ===
For a complete list of former Olympique Lyonnais players with a Wikipedia article, see here.

=== Numbers of honour ===
16 – (France) retired in 1999 in recognition of goalkeeper Luc Borrelli. Borrelli was killed in a road accident in February of that year. In 2011, the number was brought out of retirement and given to back-up goalkeeper Anthony Lopes and as since been reissued again.

17 – retired in 2003 in recognition of midfielder Marc-Vivien Foé. Foé died while playing for Cameroon in the 2003 FIFA Confederations Cup at the Stade de Gerland, Lyon. The number was brought out of retirement in 2008 to allow Cameroonian player Jean Makoun to wear it. Following Makoun's departure, the number went without use for a year. In 2011, it was given to Alexandre Lacazette and as since been reissued again.

=== Award winners ===
UNFP Player of the Year

The following players have won the UNFP Player of the Year while playing for Lyon:

- (Ghana) Michael Essien – 2005
- (Brazil) Juninho – 2006
- (France) Florent Malouda – 2007
- (France) Karim Benzema – 2008
- (Argentina) Lisandro López – 2010
- (France) Alexandre Lacazette – 2015

UNFP Young Player of the Year

The following players have won the UNFP Young Player of the Year while playing for Lyon:

- (France) Florian Maurice – 1995
- (France) Sidney Govou – 2001
- (France) Hatem Ben Arfa – 2008
- (France) Nabil Fekir – 2015

UNFP Goalkeeper of the Year

The following player have won the UNFP Goalkeeper of the Year while playing for Lyon:

- (France) Grégory Coupet – 2003, 2004, 2005, 2006
- (France) Hugo Lloris – 2009, 2010, 2012

Bravo Award

The following players have won the Bravo Award while playing for Lyon:

- (France) Karim Benzema – 2008

== Coaches ==
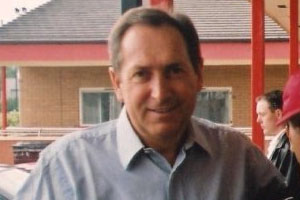
Gérard Houllier, former coach of Lyon.

Olympique Lyonnais has had 22 permanent coaches and two caretaker coaches since the club's first appointed Oscar Heisserer as a professional coach in 1950. Heisserer also served as the first player-coach of the club, coming out of retirement to play during his final season at the club. The longest-serving coach in terms of time was Aimé Mignot, who coached Lyon for eight years from 1968 to 1976. Alain Perrin, who coached the club from 2007 to 2008, was the first Lyon coach to achieve the double.

=== Current coaching staff ===
As of 9 November 2026

Position	Name
Head coach	(Spain) Carlos Vicens
Assistant coach	(Spain) Mario Enguidanos (Spain) Jordi Lie Fernández (Spain) Lander Iza García (France) Adrien Tarascon (Portugal) Jorge Maciel
Goalkeeping coach	(France) Sébastien Hamel
Fitness coach	(Spain) Ramiro Marín (France) Alexandre Farhi (France) Florian Testard
Video analyst	(France) Adrien Assoun (France) Florian Luong (France) Geoffrey Garcia (France) Yannick Pothier
Head of medical	(France) Yann Fournier
Doctor	(France) Emmanuel Dielemans
Physiotherapist	(France) Johann Howse (France) Jérémy Jacquemot (France) Guillaume Morel (France) Sylvain Rousseau (Tunisia) Abdeljellil Redissi
Nutritionist	(France) Pierre Mastain
Team manager	(France) Alexandre Dupuy (France) Julien Sokol
Steward	(France) Frédéric Babusci (France) Lotfi Eladjabi (France) Jérôme Renaud

== Honours ==
Lyon has won Ligue 1 seven times, which ranks sixth in French football history. Lyon has the distinction of starting a national record-breaking streak of seven successive titles beginning with the 2001–02 season. The club has also been crowned champions of Ligue 2 three times, won five Coupe de France titles, one Coupe de la Ligue title and eight Trophée des Champions. Though the club is a regular participant in the UEFA Champions League, they have only reached as far as the semi-finals, which was accomplished during the 2009–10 and 2019–20 seasons. Lyon has won the UEFA Intertoto Cup, achieving this honour in 1997.

=== Domestic ===
==== League ====
- Ligue 1
  - Winners (7): 2001–02, 2002–03, 2003–04, 2004–05, 2005–06, 2006–07, 2007–08
  - Runners-up (5): 1994–95, 2000–01, 2009–10, 2014–15, 2015–16
- Ligue 2
  - Winners (3): 1950–51, 1953–54, 1988–89

==== Cups ====
- Coupe de France
  - Winners (5): 1963–64, 1966–67, 1972–73, 2007–08, 2011–12
  - Runners-up (4): 1962–63, 1970–71, 1975–76, 2023–24
- Coupe de la Ligue
  - Winners (1): 2000–01
  - Runners-up (5): 1995–96, 2006–07, 2011–12, 2013–14, 2019–20
- Trophée des Champions
  - Winners (8): 1973, 2002, 2003, 2004, 2005, 2006, 2007, 2012
  - Runners-up (4): 1967, 2008, 2015, 2016

=== International competitions ===
- UEFA Intertoto Cup
  - Winners (1): 1997

== Olympique Lyonnais women ==
Olympique Lyonnais Féminin, renamed in 2025 as OL Lyonnes, currently play in France's top division, Division 1 Féminine. The ladies team was set up in the 1970s as part of FC Lyon, but was attached to OL in the summer of 2004. They mostly play their home games at Groupama OL Training Center, 200 metres from Parc Olympique Lyonnais, the main stadium. From 2025, they share the main stadium as their home ground.

=== Honours ===
Lyon women's team are described as the most successful club in women's football in the world, having won 18 French league (Première Ligue) titles, 10 French cups (Coupe de France Féminine) and 8 European (UEFA Women's Champions League) titles.
