= Michele Kang =

American businesswoman (born 1959)

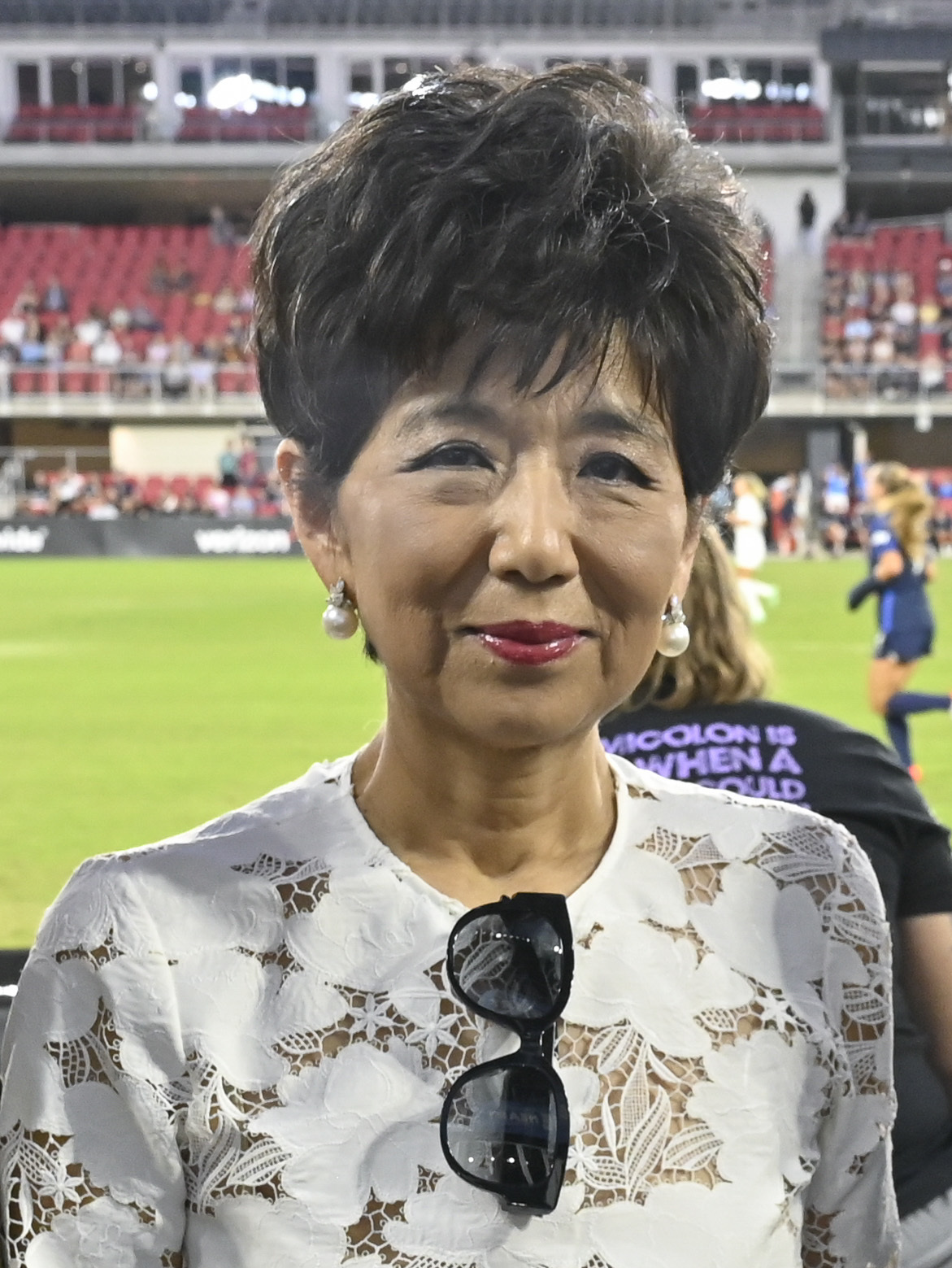
- Kang at a Washington Spirit game in 2022
- Born: 1 June 1959 (age 67); Seoul, South Korea
- Education: University of Chicago (BA); Yale School of Management (MPPM)
- Occupation: Investment
- Known for: President and majority owner of Olympique Lyonnais; Majority owner of Washington Spirit; Majority owner of OL Lyonnes; Majority owner of London City Lionesses; Creation of Kynisca
- Board member of: OL Groupe

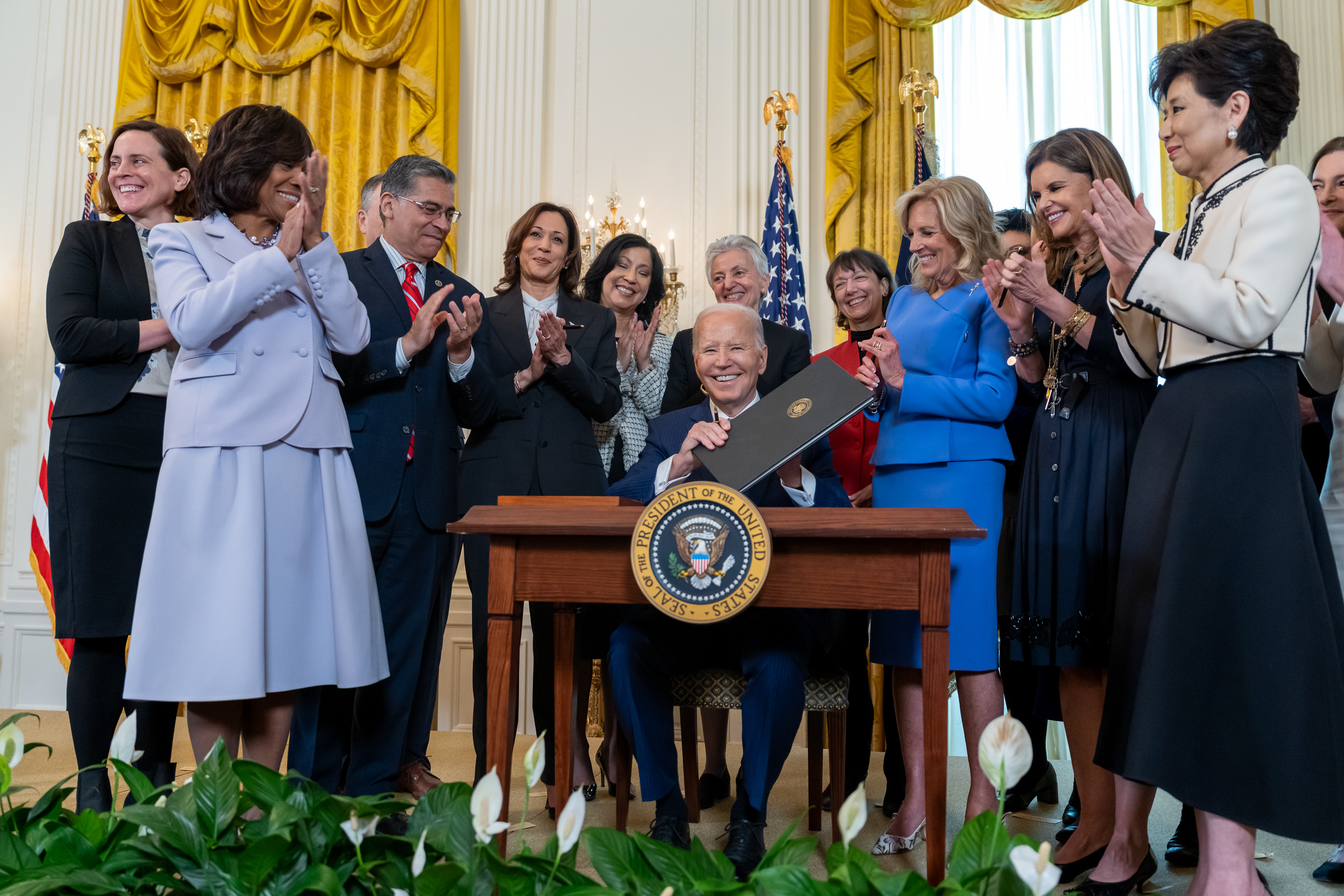
Kang (far right) at President Joe Biden's signing of an executive order on advancing women's health research and innovation, March 18, 2024, in the East Room of the White House

Yongmee Michele Kang (born 1 June 1959) is a South Korean-born American businesswoman, philanthropist, investor, and owner of multiple association football teams. She became vice president of the e-Business unit of Northrop Grumman in 2000. In 2008, she founded Cognosante, a medical technology company, and Cognosante Ventures, a venture capital firm.

Born and raised in Seoul, South Korea, Kang studied at Ewha Womans University and Sogang University before moving to the United States in 1980. She graduated in economics from the University of Chicago, and later earned a master's degree in public and private management from the Yale School of Management.

Since 2020, Kang has focused on investing in women's football. She became majority owner of the Washington Spirit, which competes in the NWSL; the London City Lionesses, which was promoted to the Women's Super League at the end of the 2024–25 season; and OL Lyonnes, which competes in the French Première Ligue and the record winner of UEFA Women's Champions League. In 2024, she established London-based Kynisca as an umbrella management group for her multi-club ownership structure.

In 2025, she became president of Olympique Lyonnais (the men's club), and the majority owner in 2026. Kang has been described as "the first tycoon of women's football."

== Early life and education ==
Kang was born and raised in Seoul, South Korea, the youngest of three sisters. She studied at the Ewha Womans University, a private institute in Seoul. Her ambitions had been to become either an opera singer, a professional basketball player, or a teacher. Encouraged by her father to study business administration, she entered Sogang University in Seoul in 1980. The only female student, she topped her class in the first year, but realized that she could have better opportunities in the U.S.

As she related about her growing up, Korean women were expected to get a proper education but not for a profession; even if one was highly educated, they were expected to ultimately get married and raise their families. In her own words:

Even if you graduate with the highest score, you would probably be an assistant to the chairman. Then, when you get married, you will be voluntarily or involuntarily asked to leave.

In 1981, Kang's parents allowed her to move abroad to pursue her academic pursuits. Using a loan originally intended for her future wedding, she moved to Chicago, enrolling as an economics major at the University of Chicago. After obtaining her bachelor's degree, she earned a master's degree in public and private management (MPPM) at the Yale University School of Organization and Management (which later became the Yale School of Management and the degree, Master of Business Administration, or MBA).

The problem was that I have never been very good at accepting what I "should" or "should not" do, especially when it came to what a woman can or cannot do. With my father's reinforcement, I believed I could do anything a boy could do. I wanted something different from the future than what was expected of me.

— Michele Kang

== Business career ==
=== Beginning ===
Kang initially worked as a management consultant for various companies related to information technology. She then became a partner with Ernst & Young, specializing in the high-tech and telecommunications industries.

=== Northrop Grumman ===
Kang joined Northrop Grumman, the American aerospace and defense technology company, in 2000 as a senior executive. In 2003, she became vice president of their Health & Science Solutions unit. During her four-year leadership, the company was estimated to have grown four-fold.

=== Rexahn Pharmaceuticals ===
Following the resignation of two directors in 2006, Kang, along with Charles Beever and Kwang Soo Cheong, were elected to the board of directors at Rexahn Pharmaceuticals, headquartered at Rockville, Maryland. Rexahn and Ochupirre Pharma, Inc., a privately held clinical-state ophthalmic biopharmaceutical company, merged in 2020.

=== Cognosante ===
In 2008, Kang resigned from Northrop Grumman to start her own company which she named in "the empty room above her garage". Her aim for the company was "to disrupt and challenge the status quo in the U.S. healthcare system". The corporation works with federal and state health agencies to "expand access to care, improve care delivery, address social determinants of health, and ensure safety and security through multi-faceted technology and customer experience (CX) solutions." Kang has said that she is focused on developing a pipeline of opportunities that "will directly improve the lives of veterans, military spouses, persons with disabilities, seniors and residents in underserved communities."

On 15 April 2024, Michele sold Cognosante to Accenture Federal Services for undisclosed financial terms. The transaction was completed in May 2024.

=== Eagle Football Holdings Limited ===
Eagle Football Holdings was founded in 2022 and is owned by John Textor for the management of his majority-owned football clubs, Botafogo FR in Brazil, Olympique Lyonnais in France and RWDM Brussels in Belgium. Kang joined the company's board of directors on 21 March 2023, becoming a minority owner. By then, the company faced a sharp financial decline of 19% from the previous year, amounting to $540 million in debts. Mainly due to Kang's contributions, the company saw 24% increase in revenue by 2024, stability of the expenditure and cutting the total deficit to £422 million.

==== OL Groupe/Eagle Football Group ====
The OL Groupe was established in 1999 to manage Olympique Lyonnais and the club's assets. Textor acquired the majority ownership in 2022 and the company became a subsidiary of Eagle Football Holdings. By 2023, the OL Groupe's management of the club was critically penurious that the Direction Nationale du Contrôle de Gestion (DNCG, the French authority for monitoring the finances of French football clubs) issued a warning, if the company could not provide an additional €60 ($70) million to the club, it could face sanction.

Textor became chairperson of the OL Groupe in May 2023, and his major task was resolving the club's financial problems. One solution was to sell LDLC arena, a multi-purpose indoor stadium, either as full or 40 percent purchase, and its women's football teams. The company had Olympique Lyonnais Féminin, affiliated with the Lyon men's team, and Seattle Reign FC (then called OL Reign) that competed in the US National Women's Soccer League (NWSL). It was an opportunity for Kang to acquire the teams, but could not go for OL Reign since she already had Washington Sprit, which also competes in NWSL. It is general rule, but sometimes controversial system, in football that different teams owned by a single entity should not play in the same competition. On 12 April 2023, Kang announced a plan to get a majority ownership for Olympique Lyonnais Féminin, she would get 52 percent of the total share and the remaining retained by OL Groupe. On 8 September 2023, OL Groupe announced the induction of Kang to its board of directors following the exit of Durcesio Mello. By 2025, Kang became the third largest investor in the Eagle Football Group.

=== Kynisca ===
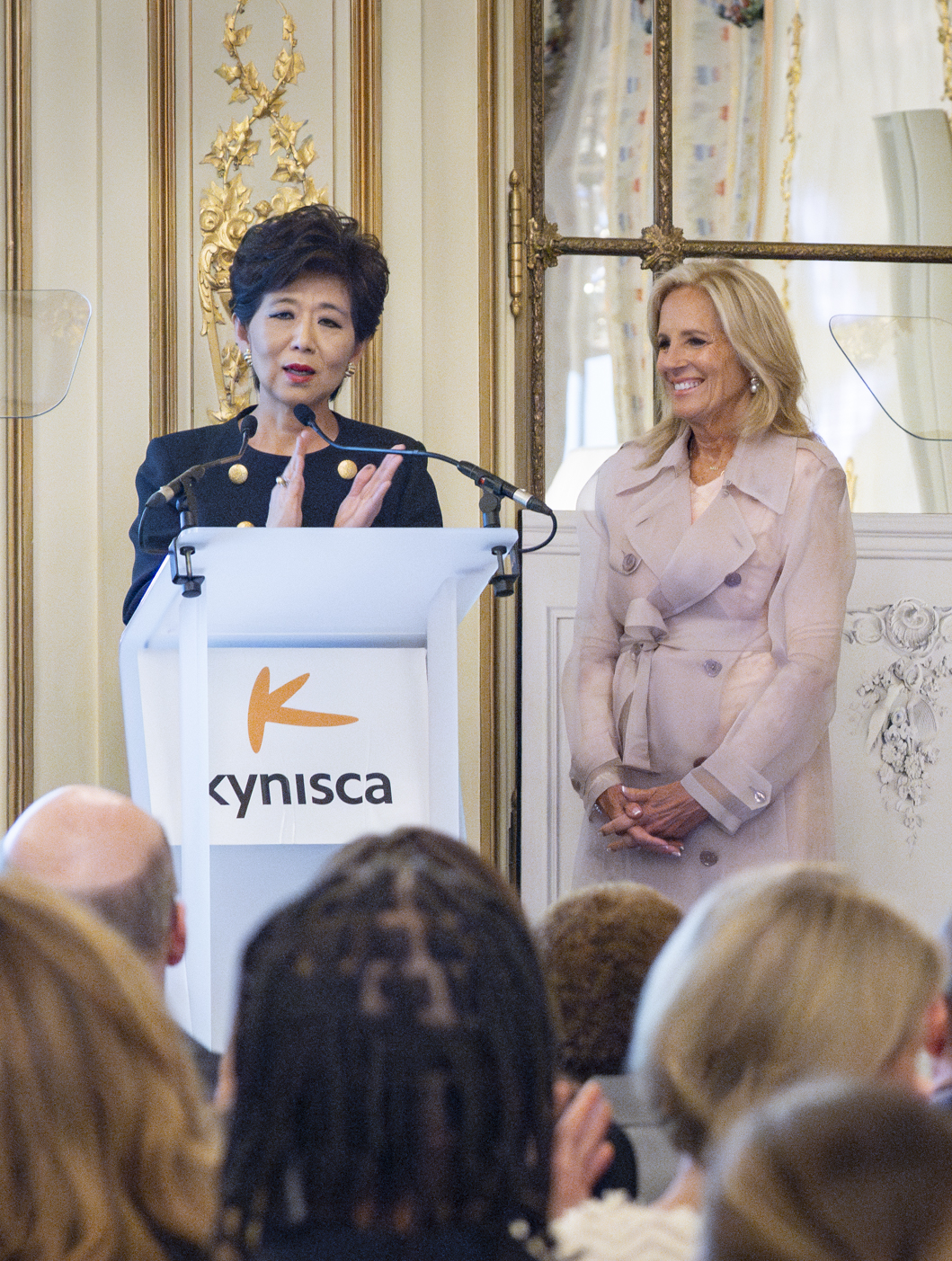
Kang launching Kynisca in Paris, during the 2024 Summer Olympics. With her is the then First Lady Jill Biden.

When Kang acquired Olympique Lyonnais Féminin in May 2023, her plan was to create a separate global women's football organization. On 27 July 2024, Kang announced the launch of Kynisca, a London-based company that would serve as the umbrella group for her multi-team sports ownership and sports science efforts. The company was named after Cynisca of Sparta, the first woman to win an event in the ancient Olympic Games. The announcement claimed that the organization was the first international group dedicated to women's association football. The launch was announced in Paris during the start of the 2024 Summer Olympics. Kang also announced the launch of $50 million in seed and matching funding for the Kynisca Innovation Hub, a non-profit research initiative specialized in female sports training.

In October 2024, Kang's Kynisca hired former FC Barcelona Femení sporting director and Royal Spanish Football Federation women's football head Markel Zubizarreta to be Kynisca's global sporting director, overseeing all of its component clubs. On 19 November 2024, Kang pledged to donate $30 million to U.S. Soccer over the next five years, the largest philanthropic investment in U.S. Soccer's women's and girls' program and the most generous donation ever made to U.S. Soccer by a woman. On 31 October 2024, Kynisca led a $2 million seed funding round for IDA Sports, a company producing cleats and turf shoes for female athletes.

On 4 April 2025, Kang announced at the SheBelieves Summit that the operations of the Kynisca Innovation Hub will integrate into U.S. Soccer's Soccer Forward Foundation, amounting a $25 million investment to support U.S. Soccer's efforts. This brings Kang's total investment to the Federation to $55 million.

=== Kang Women's Institute ===
On 2 December 2025, Kang launched the Kang Women's Institute in partnership with the Soccer Forward foundation of the United States Soccer Federation. The primary objective of the institute is for a systematic study on the needs of female athletes and working in collaboration with the NWSL and the United Soccer League. Research into women's welfare and health issues are started in collaboration with the University of North Carolina at Chapel Hill and Duke University. Kang committed $55 million for the project, $25 million will be for the management of the institute and $30 million will be distributed for youth sports, coaching development, and player pathways.

== Sports ownership ==
Kang has been called "the first tycoon of women's football" as she owns multiple football clubs in US, England and France. BBC described her as "leading a football revolution."

=== Washington Spirit ===
==== Background ====
Kang had little knowledge of football before she entered into club ownership. She had played football and volleyball in her college days, but tennis became her favorite sport. She did not know anything about football clubs, the business, or the players, as she remarked: "I didn't even know who [Lionel] Messi was." In 2019, the United States women's national soccer team won the FIFA Women's World Cup. Kang attended the formal celebration on Capitol Hill; it was only then and there that she came to learn the nature of women's football and the existence of the football club, the Washington Spirit. She was invited to the celebration by Tom Daschle, a board member at Cognosante and former Democratic senator. Daschle introduced her to Steve Baldwin, the managing owner of the Washington Spirit. Baldwin immediately won her over to join the club ownership group. Kang later said "When I met the team after the World Cup, I knew I wanted to help lead this club. I believe it is essential for successful women to take the lead in advancing other women, and I look forward to doing so for the women of the Washington Spirit."

==== Acquisition of the Spirit ====
On 29 December 2020, the Spirit announced that Kang had joined the club's ownership group. Later reports confirmed that she had a 35 percent stake in the team, equal to former majority owner Steve Baldwin's stake, though Baldwin retained control over the team. Following Spirit coach Richie Burke removing himself from coaching duties in August 2021 and subsequent media reports alleging abusive behavior by Burke toward players, Kang began pursuing majority and controlling ownership of the club.

After a protracted negotiation process, Baldwin and minority owner Bill Lynch agreed to sell the club to Kang. Following league approvals, Kang officially became the majority owner on 30 March 2022. She became the first woman of color to be the majority owner of an NWSL club.

During the negotiations, the Spirit won the 2021 NWSL championship on 20 November 2021, defeating the Chicago Red Stars 2–1.

On 24 May 2023, Kang's acquisition of the Spirit was named the Sports Business Journal 2023 'Deal of the Year'.

=== OL Lyonnes ===
By the time Kang joined the OL Groupe in 2023, Olympique Lyonnais Féminin had been known as the "most successful team in Europe," having won 15 domestic (Première Ligue) and 8 European (UEFA Women's Champions League) titles. When Kang disclosed on 12 April 2023 her plan to buy the team, the club publicly denied such move. The next day, the team won the Coupe de France féminine 2–1 over Paris Saint-Germain, its 10th victory in the competition, on a brace by Ada Hegerberg. Kang attended the match and raised the trophy with Lyon.

On 16 May 2023, Kang announced the formal agreement with OL Groupe for the acquisition of Olympique Lyonnais Féminin. She would form a separate entity (later named Kynisca) that would be composed of her stake in the Washington Spirit and Olympique Lyonnais Féminin. OL Groupe would retain a 48 percent stake in the new entity, and Kang would become the club's majority owner and CEO. The transaction was approved by regulators in February 2024.

On 19 May 2025, Kang announced that she had rebranded Olympique Lyonnais Féminin to OL Lyonnes, symbolizing a bold, independent identity. She explained that y was used in place of i to retain reference to the city, and the parent club, but entirely dropping Féminin to designate the club as a separate management from that of the men's. A new logo was also introduced which shows the head part of a roaring red lioness with blue and gold accents, and a crest above it. The club will also adopt a new slogan: Nouvelle Histoire, Même Légende ("New Story, Same Legend") and will play all home matches the 59,000-seat Groupama Stadium.

=== London City Lionesses ===
London City Lionesses were originally Millwall Lionesses but broke away from Millwall in 2019 to become an independent women's football club and competed in the Women's Championship, the second-highest division of women's football in England. It was owned by entrepreneurs Anthony and Diane Culligan, with Diane serving as chairwoman and running the club's operations. In June 2023, all the club's players sent a collective message to owner Diane Culligan asking her to sell the club or raise additional investment, citing financial instability, a lack of players signed for the upcoming season, and the lack of a permanent manager.

On 15 December 2023, the Lionesses announced that Kang had acquired the club for an undisclosed price. Following the purchase, the Lionesses hired Jocelyn Prêcheur (formerly of Paris St Germain) as its coach, moved the club to Hayes Lane in Bromley, and announced plans for a dedicated training center at Aylesford in Kent. They finished the 2023–24 season in eighth position. The club's opening match of the 2024–25 Women's Championship, a 1–1 draw against Newcastle United W.F.C., drew a club-record 1,781 attendees. Experienced players were recruited, including Kosovare Asllani, captain of Sweden's national team, Sofia Jakobsson, and Saki Kumagai, captain of Japan's national team.

On 4 May 2025, the Lionesses got a point in a 2–2 draw against Birmingham City which secured them at the top of the 2024–25 table, earning promotion to the Women's Super League, the top tier in English football. Kang carried the trophy and celebrated with the players on the pitch as the team became the first independent (not affiliated with men's teams) club to compete in WSL.

In June 2024, Kang acquired Cobdown Park in Ditton, Kent, and used it as a training ground for the Lionesses and its academy teams. In September 2025, the Tonbridge and Malling Borough Council approved the plan for constructing the club's training center of the highest standard. The project will transform the club's 28-acre site into a world-class Cobdown Performance Center, featuring a dedicated first-team base, upgraded academy infrastructure, a community-level 3G pitch, and new facilities such as modern changing rooms and medical space. Construction is expected to begin in 2026, with an opening planned for 2027. The development is also projected to create over 50 permanent jobs and inject more than £1 million annually into the local Kent economy.

=== Olympique Lyonnais ===
In October 2024, DNCG announced that Olympique Lyonnais were provisionally demoted from the top-tier competition, Ligue 1 to Ligue 2 for the next season due to financial mismanagement of having about £200 million in debt. The team ended at sixth place in the Ligue 1 2024–25 season, making them technically qualify for competing in the UEFA Europa League 2025–26 season. On 24 June 2025, DNCG confirmed the demotion, and the team was relegated to Ligue 2 and disqualified from UEFA competition. In an interview on TV Globo, Textor announced his new plan and relinquishing the leadership of Lyon, saying, "I've got very good partners in the Eagle Football Group shareholders who are going to take a lead on dealing with some of the issues that I have frankly not been very good at dealing with."

On 30 June 2025, the Eagle Football Holdings announced that Textor resigned from the top administrative responsibilities in the Eagle Football Group and leadership in Olympic Lyonnais, and that Kang had been appointed Chair of the Eagle Football Group and President of the football club. Under Kang's leadership, the club reduced its financial debts by selling Rayan Cherki and Maxence Caqueret, and reducing the salaries of Alexandre Lacazette and Anthony Lopes. On 7 July, Kang, the Eagle Football Group and Ares Capital Corporation (an investment company employed by the Eagle Football Holdings) signed an agreement that Kang will provide additional financial recovery including ~ $35 million. The agreement also stated that Kang's position in the Eagle Football Group could not be terminated until 30 June 2027, and also that Ares should not make any enforcement action in the shares of the Eagle Football Group until 30 June 2026. The DNCG appeal committee re-evaluated the club's holdings, and on 9 July, announced revocation of the relegation. The club became eligible to compete in both Ligue 1 and UEFA Europa League.

The Eagle Football Holdings had a huge debt to Ares company, over $547 million with high annual interests of 16 and 18 per cent, under different schemes since 2023. On 27 May 2026, Ares applied to the London High Court for putting the Eagle Football Holdings under administration. A day later, the football holding company was officially sanctioned. In June, Kang and Ares joined forces to acquire Olympic Lyonnais.

On 23 June 2026, the Eagle Football Group announced that it agreed to sell its entire share (87.78%) in Olympic Lyonnais for $30 million to Kang. The next day, Kang announced her agreement and became the sole majority owner of the club.

== Philanthropy ==
As a philanthropist, Kang created the Cognosante Foundation and is an active supporter of The Kennedy Center, which also was a front-of-jersey sponsor of the Washington Spirit in 2022. She has served on the boards of the American Red Cross, Washington National Opera, Northern Virginia Technology Council, and Palm Beach Symphony. Since 2023, she is member of the National Council of the White House Historical Association.

In June 2022, Kang was announced as an investor in Just Women's Sports, an American media company dedicated to women's sports.

She had been a long-time supporter of the National Museum of the Marine Corps and the Chosin Few, a member organization of veterans, spouses and lineal descendants of the Battle of Chosin Reservoir. In September 2022, Kang attended a military reunion of veterans who fought at Chosin Reservoir for which she donated $100,000 of her personal money to cover their travel costs.

Kang had never seen a rugby union match until the 2024 Summer Olympics. On 30 July 2024, she attended the women's rugby sevens match between the U.S. and Australia, with the U.S. winning to take the bronze medal. It was the first time the Americans won any medal in Olympic rugby. Impressed by what she witnessed, Kang on the spot announced a $4 million donation to the U.S. women's rugby sevens team over four years. She later said: "Yes, that was an expensive game for me."

On 19 November 2024, Kang announced a $30 million, five-year donation to the United States Soccer Federation to be used specifically on funding training and talent identification camps for the federation's junior national teams and developmental programs for female coaches and referees. The donation was the largest ever made to the federation's women's programs.

I am committed to raising the standard of excellence in women's soccer, both on and off the pitch, by delivering the resources female athletes need to reach their full potential.

Kang's total donations in 2024 was estimated at $84 million for which The Chronicle of Philanthropy 's listed her in its "Philanthropy 50" in 2025.

On 7 April 2025, Kang invested an additional $25 million to support U.S. Soccer. The investment followed her $30 million donation she made in 2024. In addition, U.S. Soccer CEO JT Batson and Kang announced that the U.S. Soccer will integrate the current operations of Kynisca Innovation Hub into the Soccer Forward Foundation.

== Honors and awards ==
- 2012, Kang was awarded among 100 Women Leaders in STEM.
- 2015, she received the EY Entrepreneur of The Year in the Greater Washington Region.
- 2016, she was among the Top 100 CEO Leaders in STEM.
- 2018–2021, she was elected to the board of governors of the American Red Cross.
- 2019, she received the American Free Enterprise Medal by Palm Beach Atlantic University.
- 2022, she was awarded the Washington Business's lifetime achievement award and inducted to the Washington Business Hall of Fame.
- 2022, she was named "Power Player in Women's Sports" by Sports Business Journal.
- 2023, she received the U.S. Award for Services.
- 2023, she received the Horatio Alger Award.
- 2023, her acquisition of the Washington Spirit was awarded was the Sports Business Journal's "Deal of the Year".
- 2023, she was included in "The Power List 2023: The 50 Most Influential Figures in Sports" by Sports Illustrated.
- 2023, she became elected board member of the European Football Clubs for the term 2023–2027.
- 2024, she was included in Sports Business Journal's "Most Influential" list.
- 2024, she was listed among the "Fifty most influential people in sport" by The Telegraph.
- 2024, she was named among Virginia Business's "Living Legends 2024".
- 2025, she was listed among "2025 Ten Influencers" in sports by SportsPro.
- 2025, The Washington Post named her as one of the "50 People Shaping our Society in 2025".
- 2025, she was named to the Time 100 "Philanthropy 2025" for her support of women's sports.
- 2025, she was listed at position 28 in the "America's Richest Self-Made Women" by Forbes.
- 2025, she was named at position 28 in the "Philanthropy 50" among America's biggest donors by The Chronicle of Philanthropy.
- 2025, she was named "Sports Philanthropist of the Year" by ESPN.
- 2025, she received the first "Eagle Honor Award" from the USA Rugby (the United States of America Rugby Football Union, Ltd.).
- 2025, she was listed among the "2025 Class of Great Immigrants, Great Americans" by the Carnegie Corporation of New York.
- 2025, Forbes launched its "Most Powerful Women in Sports" list in October and Kang was named at #5.
- 2025, she was included among 25 people in "The FT Influence List 2025" of the British daily Financial Times.
- 2026, she received the 2025 "Gender Equality, Diversity and Inclusion Champions Awards" for European region from the International Olympic Committee.
- 2026, she was included in "Time 100 Most Influential People in Sports 2026".

== Personal life ==
While working as vice president of Northrop Grumman, Kang developed breast cancer, which troubled her career. Medical care helped her to remain cancer-free, following which she started her own company, Cognosante.

Kang's $15 million sale in 2022 of her condominium in Palm Beach, Florida was the third-largest in Palm Beach history for an oceanfront apartment.
