= Eagle Football Holdings =

English holding company

Eagle Football Holdings Limited
- Formerly: Eagle Football Holdings Bidco Limited
- Type: Private
- Industry: Football
- Founded: 28 September 2022; 3 years ago in Delaware, U.S.
- Founder: John Textor
- Headquarters: London, England
- Area served: Brazil, Belgium, England, France
- Key people: Michele Kang (Chair); Matt Niehaus (President)
- Website: eaglefootball.com

Eagle Football Holdings Limited (originally Eagle Football Holdings Bidco Limited) is a global football holding company based in London and Delaware. Established in 2022, the company is chaired by American businessman John Textor. The group owns Botafogo, which competes in the Campeonato Brasileiro Série A and RWDM Brussels, which competes in the Challenger Pro League. Eagle Football previously held a minority stake in Crystal Palace F.C. of the Premier League, but sold its shares to Woody Johnson, co-owner of the New York Jets, in 2025.

== History ==
In 2021, Textor tried expanding his business venture by trying to have major investments in English football clubs including Brentford FC, Watford FC and Newcastle United. In August 2021, he succeeded with Crystal Palace F.C. with investment of £86million amounting to 40% ownership, joining Steve Parish, Josh Harris, and David Blitzer as co-owner. In January 2022, he signed a binding offer to purchase 90% ownership in Botafogo, a football club in Brazil. He then acquired 80% of RWDM Brussels in the same week.

On 20 June 2022, Textor became the owner of Olympique Lyonnais by acquiring 40% of the OL Group shares, held by IDG Capital and Pathé, and the majority of shares previously held by Jean-Michel Aulas. Around that time, he established a holding company for his football clubs as Eagle Football Holdings that initially operated at Delaware, US. The company was formally registered as Eagle Football Holdings Midco Limited in London on 28 September 2022, and eventually changed the name to Eagle Football Holdings Limited. By December 2022, Textor had acquired a 77.49% stake in Olympique Lyonnais through his company. The reported total value of the deal was $940 million (€884 million). On March 27, 2026, Textor loses control of his Eagle Football multi-club empire after its main creditor, U.S. investment firm Ares Capital Corporation, put the group’s UK-based holding company into administration.

== Crystal Palace divestment and UEFA ownership rules ==
In the 2024–25 competitions, Crystal Palace achieved their first ever major trophy win, the FA Cup. On 18 May 2025, they beat Manchester City in the 2025 FA Cup final, by a single goal from Eberechi Eze. Winning the FA Cup makes them directly qualify for the UEFA Europa League competition in the next season. However, the UEFA dictated that they were prohibited from the competition under the multi-club ownership rule. By then, Lyon had secured sixth position in the French Ligue 1 by which they qualified for the UEFA Europa League. According to UEFA, different clubs under the same ownership cannot compete in the same competition, and announced on 11 July that Lyon will play in the Europa League, because of their higher league standings. The decision also meant that Crystal Palace was demoted to the UEFA Conference League and that Nottingham Forest will take their place in Europa League. Crystal Palace was given a chance to reorganise their ownership structure and make an appeal.

Textor tried to make amends by selling his entire share in the club. In June, Textor made a deal with Woody Johnson, owner of the NFL's New York Jets and former U.S. ambassador to the U.K. He also resigned from leadership in Lyon and was replaced by Michele Kang as Chairwoman and CEO of Eagle Football Group that manages Lyon. Johnson signed the legal documents for Crystal Palace on 23 June with a deal of about £190 million ($256.37 million). On 24 July, the club announced that Johnson's purchase was complete.

On 22 July, Crystal Palace submitted an appeal to the Court of Arbitration for Sport claiming that Textor "didn't have decisive influence over the club." The court announced its decision on 11 August and stood by the UEFA's demotion to the Conference League.
