= John Textor =

American businessman (born 1965)

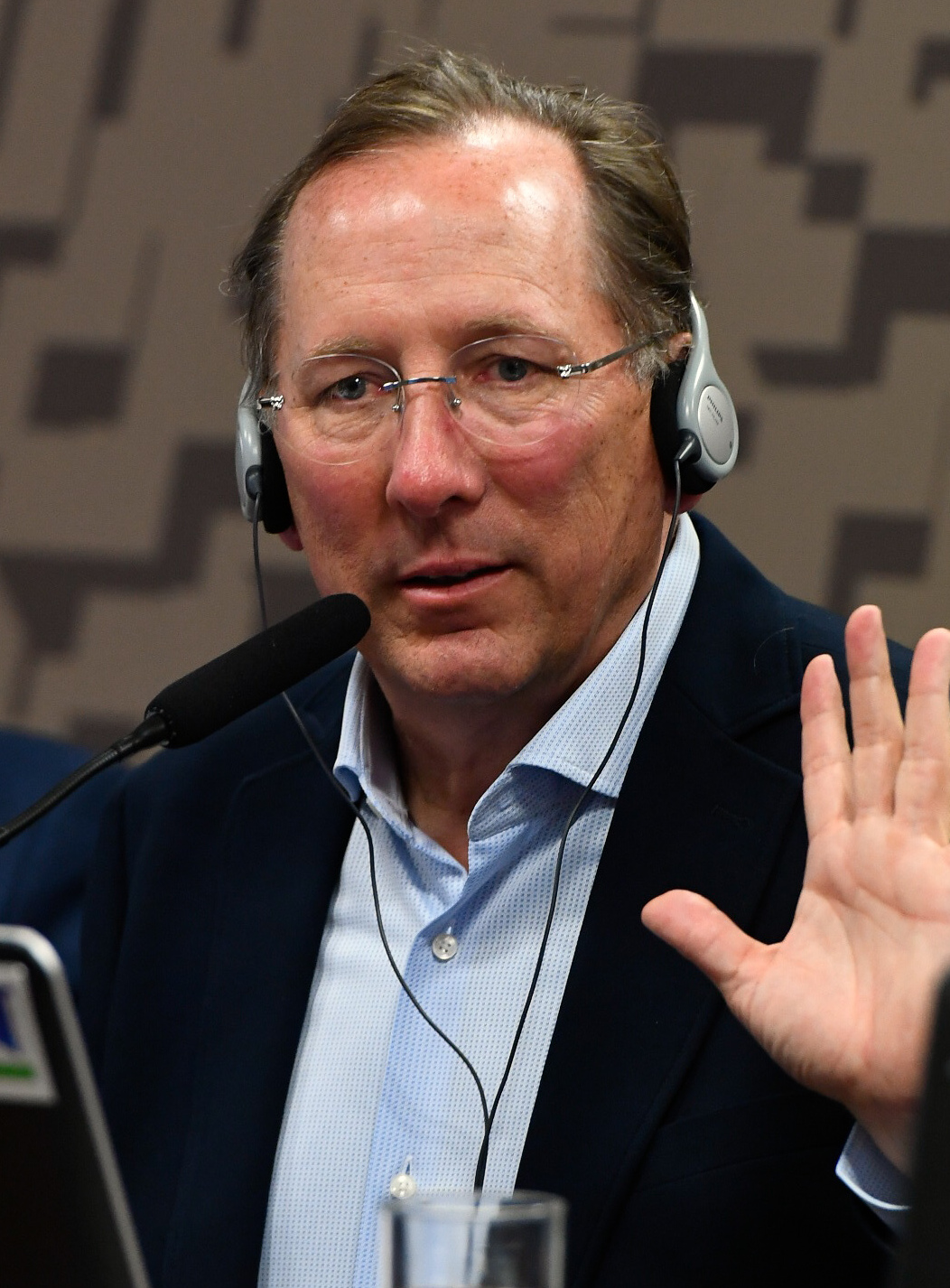
- Textor in 2025
- Born: John Charles Textor; September 30, 1965 (age 61); Kirksville, Missouri, U.S.
- Occupations: Businessman, Investor, Sports Executive
- Known for: Former owner of Eagle Football Holdings, Botafogo, RWDM Brussels, former co-owner of Crystal Palace

John Charles Textor (born September 30, 1965) is an American businessman, technology entrepreneur, and investor whose career has spanned digital media, visual effects, entertainment, and professional sports.

Textor founded Wyndcrest Holdings in the 1990s and later served as chairman of Digital Domain, the visual effects company involved in the Academy Award-winning film The Curious Case of Benjamin Button (2008) and the digital recreation of Tupac Shakur for the 2012 Coachella festival. He subsequently founded Pulse Evolution, which produced a virtual performance of Michael Jackson for the 2014 Billboard Music Awards. Textor also served as executive chairman of FaceBank Group, which merged with the streaming television service FuboTV in 2020.

Beginning in 2021, Textor expanded into professional football ownership, acquiring interests in Crystal Palace, Botafogo, RWDM Brussels, and Olympique Lyonnais through investments that became part of his Eagle Football ventures.

== Early life ==
Textor was born in 1965 and is a distant relative of the du Pont family.

He has stated that he grew up in a middle-class family in the Palm Beach area and spent summers working for freight delivery companies.

In his youth, Textor competed in freestyle skateboarding events in Florida with the Sims Skateboards team. He was listed as a competitor in 1978 issues of National Skateboard Review representing Sims, and archival results show he won the Boys Freestyle division and placed second in Junior Men's Freestyle at the 1978 Pepsi Skateboard Team Challenge in Tampa. According to Craig Snyder's A Secret History of the Ollie, Textor was "one of the few who surpassed multiple world champion Rodney Mullen in freestyle competition during" the late 1970s, and Snyder's companion contest index also records Florida events that summer featuring junior and boys divisions. A 2023 profile in Brazil's UOL Esporte likewise reported that Textor won the 1978 Pepsi Skateboard Team Challenge in Tampa, defeating Mullen in freestyle competition.

Textor has said he retired from competitive skateboarding in the early 1980s after sustaining a head injury, which led him to focus on education and technology interests.

== Business career ==
Textor's early business career was shaped through Wyndcrest Partners, the private investment firm he founded in the mid-1990s. In the years that followed, he used Wyndcrest as the vehicle for a series of investments in internet and entertainment companies, including Art Technology Group, BabyUniverse, and the visual effects studio Digital Domain.

=== Action Sports ===
==== Sims Snowboards ====
Having acquired Sims Snowboards in 1996, Textor was the chairman and principal owner. During his tenure, and utilizing the trademarks owned by his partner and snowboard pioneer Tom Sims, he created the World Snowboarding Championship at Whistler, British Columbia.

=== Internet Businesses ===
==== Art Technology Group ====
Textor's holding company, Wyndcrest Partners, funded the struggling company in 1996. ATG made eCommerce software and related on demand commerce optimization applications; the company was purchased in 2010 by Oracle for approximately $1 billion.

==== JesterDigital ====
According to The Palm Beach Post, Textor's Jester Digital created an internet-based 3-D multi-user virtual world, referred to as the "metaverse" in 1999. Jester Digital's new technology was the first digital distribution platform to be endorsed by Metallica and was also supported by joint-ventures with leading digital rights management companies, such as IBM, and strategic relationships with leading music artists and action sports companies. Jester Digital Corporation was among the earliest to create internet-based multi-user virtual reality and game-like environments which paved the way for the convergence of music and the internet, massive multi-player games, and the digital distribution of entertainment content.

==== Virtual Bank/Lydian Trust Company ====
Textor was a founding director of Virtual Bank in the year 2000, an Internet banking startup. Virtual Bank was a multi-billion dollar diversified financial services company and included a private wealth business known as Lydian Trust Company.

==== BabyUniverse ====
In the early 2000s, Textor took control of BabyUniverse, a struggling online retailer. He took the company public in 2005 selling 2 million shares of common stock, equivalent to approximately $16.5 million. Using proceeds from the IPO, Textor purchased other online retailers and a marketing company to help build the brand. BabyUniverse saw an increase in revenues from $1 million to $40 million, resulting in the October 2007 sale of BabyUniverse into a reverse merger and change of control transaction with eToys.com, a well-known e-commerce company, controlled by D.E. Shaw. Textor resigned as CEO at the time of the merger, with BabyUniverse stock trading at its all-time high of $12.00 per share, having nearly tripled from its low in February of that same year. He later became Chairman of eToys.

==== Digital Domain ====
In May 2006, Textor as one of the principals of Wyncrest Holdings, acquired Digital Domain. Other principals included film director Michael Bay and former NFL player Dan Marino. According to Variety, an inside source claimed that the buyers purchased the company for an estimated $35 million.

Digital Domain won an Academy Award in 2009 for Achievement in Visual Effects for creating a believable digital human actor in The Curious Case of Benjamin Button. This achievement, known as the 'Holy Grail of "Visual Effects" by The Hollywood Reporter.

In 2011, Digital Domain Media Group entered into the film production business with a major investment into the feature film Ender's Game. Textor is credited as Producer and Executive Producer on the film.

Textor's team of around 20 artists organized the 2012 appearance of Virtual Tupac Shakur at the Coachella Valley Music Festival. The performance earned Textor's studio the Titanium Award at the 59th annual Cannes Lions International Festival of Creativity.

Digital Domain went bankrupt in 2012 and a short time later, Textor was sued by the state of Florida for $80M.

The Supreme Court of New York and the Inspector General of the State of Florida cleared Textor of any financial wrongdoing, and The Athletic reported that he had received a settlement from the hedge fund that caused the collapse. The settlement awarded Textor $8.5 million in financial damages and assigned all technology assets of Digital Domain's Florida studio.

SEC filings demonstrate that Textor used the award of these technology assets to launch the business that would ultimately become fuboTV. Textor went on to launch Facebank in 2013. "a technology-driven intellectual property company engaged in the development and promotion of human likeness technologies" and, in 2020, he bought sports streaming platform fuboTV, merging the two businesses before floating them on the New York Stock Exchange as FuboTV Inc.

These early ventures through Wyndcrest established Textor's reputation as an investor in technology and media companies, leading to later roles in digital media, virtual production, and professional sports ownership.

==== Pulse Evolution ====
In late 2013, Textor organized a group of former Digital Domain employees to create Pulse Evolution Corporation. Pulse Evolution Corporation is a globally recognized pioneer in the development of hyper-realistic digital humans for live shows, virtual reality, augmented reality, holographic, 3D stereoscopic, web, mobile, interactive and artificial intelligence applications. Pulse Evolution showcased its technology with a holographic performance of Virtual Michael Jackson at the 2014 Billboard Music Awards.

=== Technology, Media and Entertainment ===
==== fuboTV (Facebank Group) ====
According to a 2019 SEC filing, Facebank Group previously operated as Pulse Evolution Group and Recall Studios. The organization's filing described them as a digital human technology company, focused on the development, collection, protection and preparation of the personal digital likeness assets, of celebrities and consumers, for use in artificial intelligence, entertainment, personal productivity and social networking. When it acquired Fubo TV. Allywatch described the acquisition as a reverse merger that effectively enabled Fubo TV to operate as a public company. Fubo claimed that the merger expanded the organization's presence in the over-the-top television industry.

Current logo of Fubo TV

In April 2020, Textor completed the acquisition of fuboTV Media via a Zoom call. The company subsequently went public, and within two years reached a market value of more than $6 billion on the New York Stock Exchange (NYSE).

In the spring of 2020, Textor resigned from his post as Executive Chairman of fuboTV. At the time of his resignation from fuboTV, and through completion of the company's IPO on the NYSE, Textor remained the largest shareholder of fuboTV.

FuboTV grew rapidly in value as a public company, moving from the over-the-counter market, to the NYSE, to the Russell 3000 index in only nine months.

=== Football ===
==== Crystal Palace F.C. ====
In August 2021, Textor acquired a roughly 40 percent stake in Crystal Palace F.C., later increasing his ownership to approximately 45 percent by mid-2024. He invested in upgrading the club's youth academy and was part of the ownership group when Palace won their inaugural FA Cup in the 2024–25 season. In July 2025, Textor sold his stake to New York Jets owner Woody Johnson in a deal reportedly worth £190 million.

==== RWDM Brussels ====
Textor acquired Belgian club RWD Molenbeek in December 2021. The team earned promotion to Belgium's top division by winning the Challenger Pro League in 2023. In mid-2025, he initiated a rebranding of the club to Daring Brussels, referencing its historical roots. However, strong backlash from supporters led to a compromise, resulting in the name RWDM Brussels, which preserved the club's existing identity while incorporating the Brussels designation.

Before the 2026–2027 season and whilst suffering financial difficulties, RWDM was denied a professional license and relegated out of the Challenger Pro League into Belgian Division 1. In March 2026, Eagle Football Holdings Bidco Limited was placed into administration, forcing the sale of Textor's shares in the club which were later acquired in August by former RWDM owner Thierry Dailly.

==== Botafogo de Futebol e Regatas ====
In early 2022, Textor acquired Botafogo, which was grappling with debt and poor infrastructure. His data-driven strategy led to a dramatic revival: Botafogo won consecutive Taça Rio (2023 and 2024), the 2024 Campeonato Brasileiro Série A, and its first-ever Copa Libertadores in 2024. As Libertadores champions, Botafogo qualified for the 2025 FIFA Club World Cup, where they famously beat Paris Saint-Germain 1–0 and advanced to the knockout rounds. The club was also among five finalists nominated for the 2025 Ballon d'Or Men's Club of the Year. In late 2025, Botafogo was banned by FIFA from registering new players for three transfer windows after failing to pay the remaining transfer fee for Thiago Almada to Atlanta United.

On July 1, 2026, Botafogo SAF announced that John Textor, Kevin Weston, and Jordan Eliott Fikesenbaum had been removed from the company's Board of Directors following an Extraordinary General Meeting. Textor disputed the decision, and litigation concerning control of Botafogo SAF remains ongoing.

==== Olympique Lyonnais ====
In December 2022, Textor gained a controlling stake in Olympique Lyonnais through OL Groupe for $846 million. The club faced provisional relegation by French financial regulators DNCG in late 2024, but retained its Ligue 1 status following a successful appeal in July 2025. Textor argued the DNCG misunderstood his multi-club financial model, which diversified assets and liabilities through Eagle Football Holdings—a structure not reflected in their evaluation. In June 2025, Textor resigned from his leadership position at Olympique Lyonnais and was succeeded by Michele Kang as club president.

=== Eagle Football Holdings Limited ===
Established in September 2022, Eagle Football Holdings was formed to consolidate John Textor's investments in professional football through a multi-club ownership structure. Its football interests included Crystal Palace in England, Botafogo in Brazil, RWDM Brussels in Belgium, and Olympique Lyonnais in France. The model was intended to facilitate collaboration among clubs in areas including scouting, player development, recruitment, and sporting operations.

During Textor's involvement, several clubs achieved notable sporting results. RWDM secured promotion to Belgium's top division in 2023, while Botafogo won both the Campeonato Brasileiro Série A and Copa Libertadores in 2024. Crystal Palace won the FA Cup in 2025, before Textor completed the sale of his ownership interest in the club on July 24, 2025.

The group also faced financial and regulatory difficulties, particularly concerning Olympique Lyonnais and its acquisition financing. In March 2026, creditor Ares Capital Corporation, acting as security agent for secured noteholders, initiated proceedings that resulted in Eagle Football Holdings Bidco Limited entering administration under English insolvency law. Cork Gully partners Stephen Cork and Anthony Cork were appointed joint administrators on March 27, 2026.

The administration applied specifically to Eagle Football Holdings Bidco Limited, an intermediate holding company within the investment structure. It did not place Eagle Football's subsidiaries or associated football clubs into administration. Under English insolvency law, the administrators assumed control of Bidco, while the powers of its directors were suspended.

During the proceedings, Bidco's shareholding in Eagle Football Group S.A., the parent company of Olympique Lyonnais, was sold on June 26, 2026. Its shareholding in RWDM Brussels was subsequently sold on July 31, 2026. The administrators continued efforts to realize the company's interest in SAF Botafogo, which remained subject to ownership and control disputes.
