= Roger Magnusson =

Swedish former footballer (born 1945)

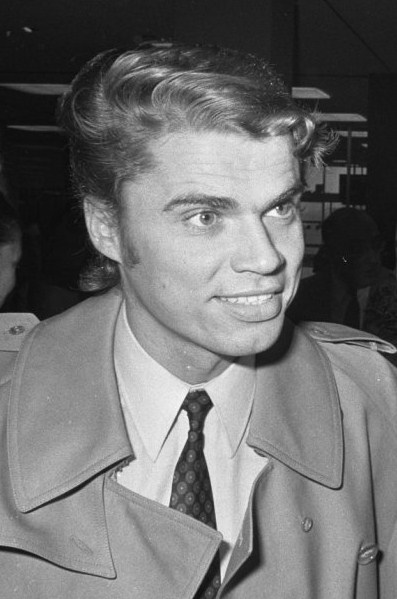
- Magnusson in 1971

Personal information
- Date of birth: 20 March 1945 (age 81)
- Place of birth: Mönsterås, Sweden
- Height: 1.81 m (5 ft 11 in)
- Position: Right winger

Senior career*
Years	Team	Apps	(Gls)
1961–1966	Åtvidaberg	97	(40)
1966–1967	1. FC Köln	20	(4)
1967–1968	Juventus	6	(2)
1968–1974	Marseille	157	(23)
1974–1976	Red Star	26	(2)
1976	Helsingborgs IF	6	(1)
1977	Vilans BoIF	16	(11)
1979–1980	Landskrona BoIS	12	(3)
Total		340	(86)

International career
1964–1969	Sweden	14	(3)
- * Club domestic league appearances and goals

Roger Magnusson (born 20 March 1945) is a Swedish former footballer who played as a right winger. He is a brother of fellow footballer Benno Magnusson.

He played for the Sweden national team and for various clubs in Europe, including a short spell at Juventus FC. His most successful years were at Olympique de Marseille, where he formed a duo with striker Josip Skoblar winning the Ligue 1 in 1971 and 1972 and the Coupe de France in 1972. In the 1972 Coupe de France Final, he delivered two assists.

He was known for his dribbling ability and nicknamed le Garrincha suédois (The Swedish Garrincha) in Marseille. But the arrival at the club of Salif Keita pushed him away from the pitch because French teams were compelled at the time to use only two foreign players, and Marseille's coaches used mainly Keita and Skoblar. However, he remains today one of the best players to have worn the l'OM jersey.

== Honours ==
Marseille

- Coupe de France: 1968–69, 1971–72
- Ligue 1: 1970–71, 1971–72
