= 1972 Coupe de France final =

Football Cup Final

- Event: 1971–72 Coupe de France
Marseille	Bastia
2	1
- Date: 4 June 1972
- Venue: Parc des Princes, Paris
- Referee: Robert Frauciel
- Attendance: 44,069

The 1972 Coupe de France final was a football match held at Parc des Princes, Paris on 4 June 1972, that saw Olympique de Marseille defeat SEC Bastia 2–1 thanks to goals by Didier Couécou and Josip Skoblar.

== Match details ==
4 June 1972

Marseille	2–1	Bastia
Couécou 15'; Skoblar 73'		Franceschetti 85'

Parc des Princes, Paris
Attendance: 44,069
Referee: Robert Frauciel

GK	(France) Georges Carnus
DF	(France) Jean-Pierre Lopez
DF	(France) Bernard Bosquier
DF	(France) Jules Zvunka (c)
DF	(France) Edouard Kula
MF	(France) Jacques Novi
MF	(France) Gilbert Gress
MF	(France) Joseph Bonnel	(substituted off) 77'
FW	(Sweden) Roger Magnusson
FW	(Socialist Federal Republic of Yugoslavia) Josip Skoblar
FW	(France) Didier Couécou
Substitutes:
DF	(France) Jean-Louis Hodoul	(substituted in) 77'
Manager:
(France) Mario Zatelli Assistant referees: Fourth official:

GK	(Socialist Federal Republic of Yugoslavia) Ilija Pantelić
DF	(France) Victor Mosa
DF	(France) Jean-Claude Tosi
DF	(France) Jean-Louis Luccini
DF	(Socialist Federal Republic of Yugoslavia) Cvajko Savkovic
MF	(France) Georges Calmettes
MF	(France) Marc-Kanyan Case
MF	(France) Jean-Pierre Dogliani
FW	(France) François Félix
FW	10	(France) Georges Franceschetti (c)
FW	(France) Jean-Pierre Giordani	(substituted off) 77'
Substitutes:
MF	(France) Claude Papi	(substituted in) 77'
Manager:
(France) Pierre Cahuzac

== See also ==
- 1971–72 Coupe de France
