= Derby Corse =

Rivalry in French football

- Other names: Corsica derby
- Location: Corsica
- Teams: Ajaccio; Bastia
- First meeting: Ajaccio 1–3 Bastia; Division 1 (28 November 1965)
- Latest meeting: Bastia 4–0 Ajaccio; Ligue 2 (11 January 2025)
- Next meeting: TBC
- Stadiums: Stade François Coty (AC Ajaccio); Stade Armand-Cesari (SC Bastia)

Statistics
- Total meetings: 42
- Most wins: SC Bastia (23)
- Largest victory: Bastia 6–0 Ajaccio (20 May 1966); 1965–66 French Division 1

The Derby Corse (English: Corsica derby) is a rivalry in French football between AC Ajaccio and SC Bastia, the two biggest clubs on the island of Corsica. The rivalry is intensified by the existing geographical rivalry of the island. Ajaccio is the capital of the island and largest city, as well as capital of the southern Corse-du-Sud department, while Bastia is the second city of the island and capital of the northern Haute-Corse department.

After a two-year absence the league fixtures returned to the calendar in the 2012–13 Ligue 1 season. After crowd trouble during 2012–13 season the fixtures of the following season were to be played behind closed doors at neutral venues. The first league fixture (Ajaccio at home) was played in Istres, Bastia played their punishment in Martigues in a Coupe de la Ligue fixture. It was agreed that the Bastia league fixture would be played at the usual Armand-Cesari but that Ajaccio fans would not be admitted. The game had extra significance as Ajaccio required a win to avoid relegation. Despite Ajaccio taking the lead in the 4th minute Bastia drew level on 32 minutes before scoring a last minute winner to relegate ACA.

On 26 October 2024, the fixture was suspended during the 42nd minute due to fan trouble in the stands. However, the game was eventually abandoned due to heavy rainfall. The fixture was replayed on 3 December 2024, with the result being a 0–0 draw.

== Head to head ==
=== Statistics ===
As of 11 January 2025

Competition	AC Ajaccio wins	Draws	SC Bastia wins	AC Ajaccio goals	SC Bastia goals
League	10	7	21	37	54
Coupe de France	1	1	1	1	2
Coupe de la Ligue	0	0	1	0	1
Total	11	8	23	38	57

=== All–time results ===
==== League ====
#	Season	Date	Competition	Stadium	Home Team	Result	Away Team	Attendance	H2H
1	1965–66	28 November 1965	Division 2	François Coty	AC Ajaccio	1–3	SC Bastia		+1
2	1965–66	21 May 1966	Division 2	Armand-Cesari	SC Bastia	6–0	AC Ajaccio		+2
3	1966–67	9 September 1966	Division 2	François Coty	AC Ajaccio	0–2	SC Bastia		+3
4	1966–67	5 February 1967	Division 2	Armand-Cesari	SC Bastia	0–0	AC Ajaccio		+3
5	1968–69	1 December 1968	Division 1	François Coty	AC Ajaccio	4–0	SC Bastia	14,421	+2
6	1968–69	18 March 1969	Division 1	Armand-Cesari	SC Bastia	1–0	AC Ajaccio	5,900	+3
7	1969–70	5 October 1969	Division 1	Armand-Cesari	SC Bastia	2–0	AC Ajaccio	5,269	+4
8	1969–70	15 March 1970	Division 1	François Coty	AC Ajaccio	2–0	SC Bastia	4,569	+3
9	1970–71	4 October 1970	Division 1	François Coty	AC Ajaccio	6–1	SC Bastia	6,917	+2
10	1970–71	4 April 1971	Division 1	Armand-Cesari	SC Bastia	1–4	AC Ajaccio		+1
11	1971–72	4 November 1971	Division 1	François Coty	AC Ajaccio	2–0	SC Bastia	5,000	0
12	1971–72	26 March 1972	Division 1	Armand-Cesari	SC Bastia	2–1	AC Ajaccio		+1
13	1972–73	4 October 1972	Division 1	Armand-Cesari	SC Bastia	1–0	AC Ajaccio		+2
14	1972–73	25 March 1973	Division 1	François Coty	AC Ajaccio	0–1	SC Bastia	4,124	+3
15	2002–03	15 September 2002	Ligue 1	Armand-Cesari	SC Bastia	1–2	AC Ajaccio	8,488	+2
16	2002–03	31 January 2003	Ligue 1	François Coty	AC Ajaccio	1–1	SC Bastia	7,910	+2
17	2003–04	31 October 2003	Ligue 1	Armand-Cesari	SC Bastia	1–1	AC Ajaccio	6,756	+2
18	2003–04	26 March 2003	Ligue 1	François Coty	AC Ajaccio	1–0	SC Bastia	5,442	+1
19	2004–05	20 August 2004	Ligue 1	Armand-Cesari	SC Bastia	1–0	AC Ajaccio	8,598	+2
20	2004–05	11 January 2005	Ligue 1	François Coty	AC Ajaccio	1–0	SC Bastia	7,095	+1
21	2006–07	9 November 2006	Ligue 1	François Coty	AC Ajaccio	0–1	SC Bastia	5,246	+2
22	2006–07	27 April 2007	Ligue 1	Armand-Cesari	SC Bastia	4–1	AC Ajaccio	5,352	+3
23	2007–08	26 October 2007	Ligue 2	François Coty	AC Ajaccio	1–3	SC Bastia	4,556	+4
24	2007–08	5 April 2008	Ligue 2	Armand-Cesari	SC Bastia	0–1	AC Ajaccio	4,465	+3
25	2008–09	5 December 2008	Ligue 2	Armand-Cesari	SC Bastia	6–2	AC Ajaccio	3,708	+4
26	2008–09	8 May 2009	Ligue 2	François Coty	AC Ajaccio	1–1	SC Bastia	4,556	+4
27	2009–10	30 October 2009	Ligue 2	Armand-Cesari	SC Bastia	1–0	AC Ajaccio	4,272	+5
28	2009–10	2 April 2010	Ligue 2	François Coty	AC Ajaccio	1–2	SC Bastia	4,654	+6
29	2012–13	30 October 2009	Ligue 1	François Coty	AC Ajaccio	0–0	SC Bastia	10,344	+6
30	2012–13	2 March 2013	Ligue 1	Armand-Cesari	SC Bastia	1–0	SC Bastia	15,205	+7
31	2013–14	4 December 2013	Ligue 1	Stade Parsemain	AC Ajaccio	1–1	SC Bastia	0	+7
32	2013–14	20 April 2014	Ligue 1	Armand-Cesari	SC Bastia	2–1	SC Bastia	14,153	+8
33	2021–22	25 September 2021	Ligue 2	Armand-Cesari	SC Bastia	2–0	AC Ajaccio	11,686	+9
34	2021–22	12 March 2022	Ligue 2	François Coty	AC Ajaccio	0–1	SC Bastia	5,000	+10
35	2023–24	2 October 2023	Ligue 2	François Coty	AC Ajaccio	2–0	SC Bastia	4,732	+9
36	2023–24	5 February 2024	Ligue 2	Armand-Cesari	SC Bastia	1–0	AC Ajaccio	14,479	+10
37	2024–25	3 December 2024	Ligue 2	François Coty	AC Ajaccio	0–0	SC Bastia	5,530	+10
38	2024–25	11 January 2025	Ligue 2	Armand-Cesari	SC Bastia	4–0	AC Ajaccio	TBC	+11

==== Cup ====
#	Season	Date	Competition	Round	Stadium	Home Team	Result	Away Team	Attendance
1	1965–66	13 February 1966	Coupe de France	Round of 32	François Coty	AC Ajaccio	1–0	SC Bastia	
2	1971–72	12 March 1972	Coupe de France	Round of 16 Leg 1	François Coty	AC Ajaccio	0–2	SC Bastia	6,986
3	1971–72	15 March 1972	Coupe de France	Round of 16 Leg 2	Armand-Cesari	SC Bastia	0–0	AC Ajaccio	
4	2013–14	29 October 2013	Coupe de la Ligue	Third	Francis Turcan	SC Bastia	1–0	AC Ajaccio	

== Statistics ==
=== All-time goalscorers ===
Pos.	Nation	Player	Club(s)	Goals	Years
1	(France)	Pierre-Yves André	SC Bastia	9	1997–2001; 2004–2010
2	(Republic of the Congo)	François M'Pelé	AC Ajaccio	7	1968–1973
3	(France)	Fabrice Jau	SC Bastia	4	2001–2006; 2007–2010
3	(France)	Réginald Dortomb	AC Ajaccio	4	1970–1972
5	(France)	Étienne Sansonetti	SC Bastia; AC Ajaccio; AC Ajaccio; AC Ajaccio	3	1965–1967; 1967–1969; 1970–1972; 1976–1977
5	(France)	Marc-Kanyan Case	SC Bastia	3	1969–1973

=== All-time appearances ===
Pos.	Nation	Player	Club(s)	Apps	Years
1	(Tunisia)	Chaouki Ben Saada	SC Bastia	11	2001–2008; 2019–2022
2	(France)	Jean-Claude Tosi	SC Bastia; AC Ajaccio	10	1965–1973; 1973–1974
2	(France)	Xavier Collin	AC Ajaccio	10	2002–2008
4	(France)	Georges Calmettes	AC Ajaccio; SC Bastia	9	1968–1969; 1969–1973
4	(France)	Pierre-Yves André	SC Bastia	9	1997–2001; 2004–2010
6	(France)	Georges Franceschetti	SC Bastia	8	1965–1967; 1968–1972; 1974–1978
6	(Algeria)	Féthi Harek	SC Bastia	8	2007–2014
6	(France)	Jean-Pierre Serra	SC Bastia; AC Ajaccio	8	1968–1971; 1971–1972
6	(France)	René Le Lamer	AC Ajaccio	8	1969–1973
6	(France)	Yannick Cahuzac	SC Bastia	8	2005–2017
