= History of Olympique Lyonnais =

Olympique Lyonnais is a French football club in the city of Lyon. The club's first team competes in France's first football division, Ligue 1. As one of the most successful clubs in French football they won seven Ligue 1 titles fourth most of all-time. The club played 51 seasons in the top division, playing over 1,800 Ligue 1 matches.

== History ==
=== Beginnings ===
Olympique Lyonnais was established in 1896 originally as Racing Club de Lyon, which is currently known as the multisport club Lyon Olympique Universitaire. In 1899, Olympique de Lyon formed a football team within the multisport club. The early years of the club, the football section was often overshadowed by local rivals FC Lyon, who won the French championship in both the 1908 and 1909 seasons. Both LOU and FC Lyon also shared rivalries with local clubs CS Terreaux and AS Lyonnaise. In 1910, Lyon Olympique won the French Championship eclipsing their rivals. By 1917, the city of Lyon was divided with its citizens supporting only one of the four clubs.

By 1945, Lyon Olympique was managed by Félix Louot, who provided leadership, determination, and faith in order to create a professional football in the city of Lyon. His principles helped the club win the southern pool of the final wartime championship by two points over Bordeaux. In the national final, which pitted them against Rouen, Lyon Olympique lost the match 4–0. These successes propelled the club to the first division, but also led to problems regarding the cohabitation of amateurs and professionals within Lyon Olympique Universitaire. Due to numerous disagreements, Louot and his entourage began to contemplate forming their own club.

On 3 August 1950, Louot's plan came to fruition when Olympique Lyonnais was officially founded by Dr. Albert Trillat and numerous others. Due to the split, Lyon moved into the Stade de Gerland, a stadium designed by local architect Tony Garnier. The club's first manager was Oscar Heisserer and on 26 August, played its first official match defeating CA Paris-Charenton 3–0 in front of 3,000 supporters. In 1951, the club was crowned champions of the second division, thus moving up to the first division. Lyon were relegated back to the second division after just one season, despite Heisserer coming out of retirement as a player. Lyon spent the next two seasons in Division 2 building for the future by signing players such as Åke Hjalmarsson and Erik Kuld Jensen. Eventually, during the 1953–54 season, the club achieved promotion back to the first division under the leadership of Heisserer, who departed the club after a four-year stint as manager. He was replaced by Julien Darui, who only managed the club in the first division for six months before leaving his post. Lucien Troupel replaced him.

Troupel joined the club midway through the season, where Lyon ultimately finished in 12th position. Despite the inconsistent start, Troupel developed a squad full of talent, which included savvy veterans like Swiss international Jacques Fatton and Antoine Dalla Cieca, and young emerging talent in Jean Djorkaeff, Marcel Le Borgne and Bernard Gardon. The team responded the following season finishing in the top half of the table and also reaching the semi-finals of the Coupe de France. Over the next three years (1956–1959), Lyon finished mid-table. In 1959, Troupel was replaced as manager by Gaby Robert. The arrival of a new manager included the arrival of an influx of new players with the Argentine Nestor Combin, Cameroonian striker Eugène N'Jo Léa, and Frenchman Jules Sbroglia being the biggest signings. Despite the signings, Lyon still struggled finishing in 16th position for the 1959–60 season.

=== Success in 1960s and '70s ===
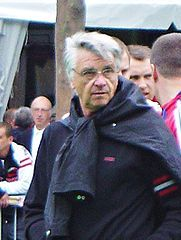
Aimé Jacquet, former France national football team and Olympique Lyonnais manager from 1976 to 1980.

Olympique Lyonnais enjoyed limited success in the 1960s, partly due to the play of strike force Fleury Di Nallo – known as "The Little Prince of Gerland" and arguably Lyon's greatest player ever – and the Argentine Néstor Combin. Under the guidance of manager Lucien Jasseron, the club achieved their highest first division finish, at the time, finishing in fifth place. The successful season culminated into the club reaching the 1963 Coupe de France final, where they faced Monaco. Lyon secured a 0–0 draw in the first match, but lost the replay 0–2. The following season, the club captured their first-ever Coupe de France title defeating Bordeaux 2–0. The club also finished in fourth position in the league.

The 1964–65 season saw the departure of Combin to Italian club Juventus. Due to this, the team suffered from his absence, finishing in a respectable sixth position in the league, but suffering elimination in the early rounds of both the Coupe de France and the UEFA Cup Winners' Cup. The 1965–66 season saw Lyon finish in 16th position, their worst finish since 1960–61. The disappointing finish ultimately led to the departure of Jasseron, but his stint at the club is remembered as being largely positive by supporters and he is known for being the first Lyon manager to win the Coupe de France.

Jasseron was replaced by Louis Hon, a former Real Madrid player and a known tactician in the Spanish league. Along with the departure of Jasseron, Lyon also lost several prominent players, including Marcel Aubour, Jean Djorkaeff, Stéphane Bruey and Michel Margottin. The loss of such talented players resulted in the team finishing in 15th position for the 1966–67 season. On a positive note, however, the club won their second Coupe de France title, defeating Sochaux 3–1. The following season, Hon and the team again struggled finishing for the second straight season, finishing in the bottom half of the league. The club did reach the quarterfinals of that year's UEFA Cup Winners' Cup, losing to German side Hamburger SV. The struggles domestically led to the firing of Hon, and he was replaced by former Lyon legend Aimé Mignot.

Mignot first season was mostly timid as the club finished a modest ninth in the league and were eliminated in the round of 16 in the Coupe de France. This inconsistent season was primarily due to Di Nallo breaking his leg in just the fourth match of the season. Despite a healthy Di Nallo returning for the 1969–70 season, Lyon still suffered, finishing 15th.

The 1970s saw the arrival of Yugoslavian defender Ljubomir Mihajlović, commonly called "Loubo" in France, and also a changing of the guard with youth product Bernard Lacombe taking over as primary goalscorer from Di Nallo, who was now an aging veteran that left the team following the 1974–75 season. The new decade also saw the emergence of the Moroccan-born French midfielder Serge Chiesa, who formed a stellar partnership with Lacombe. The 1972–73 season saw Lyon win their third Coupe de France title, defeating Nantes 2–1 with Lacombe ultimately scoring the game-winning goal. The following two seasons over, Lyon finished third with Lacombe and Chiesa leading the way. The next season, despite getting off to a strong start in the league, Lyon struggled fighting relegation for most of the season. Due to this, halfway through the season, Mignot resigned and made way for Aimé Jacquet, who served in a player-coach role for the rest of the season. The coaching change successfully changed the club's focus and Lyon eventually finished in 16th position. Jacquet also led the club to the Coupe de France final where they lost to Marseille 0–2.

Despite early positives in Jacquet's run as manager, his four-year run (1976–1980) was uneventful with the club fighting relegation in two seasons including barely surviving in Jacquet's final season. During Jacquet's tenure, Lyon changed presidents and also lost Bernard Lacombe to rivals Saint-Étienne. Midway through the 1979–80 season, Jacquet announced he was departing the club at the end of the season. He was replaced by Jean-Pierre Destrumelle, who hired former Lyon man Fleury Di Nallo as his assistant.

Destrumelle spent only one year at the club, but brought in several notable players such as Jean Tigana, Alain Moizan, Simo Nikolić and Jean-Marc Furlan. The club finished in the top half of the table and also played in front of a record crowd for the Stade Gerland with 48,852 spectators on hand for the visit of Saint-Étienne, a figure that would remain a French record for ten years. The next six years (1981–1987), the team played under three different managers, Vlatko Kovačević, Robert Herbin and Robert Nouzaret, and also were operated by numerous presidents and chairmen. By 1987, the club were playing in the second division.

=== Budding success ===
In June 1987, Rhône businessman Jean-Michel Aulas took control of the club and invested in the club with the objective of turning Lyon into an established Ligue 1 side. His ambitious plan, titled "OL – Europe", was designed to develop the club on the European level and back into the first division within a time-frame of no more than four years.

Aulas' first season (1987–88) in charge was a success as the club finished a respectable second in Groupe B of the second division only faltering in the promotion play-offs. Three different managers served under Aulas during the season. Nouzaret, who started the season, departed midway and he was replaced by Denis Papas who only lasted a few months. Former Lyon player Marcel Le Borgne took over and managed until the end of the season.

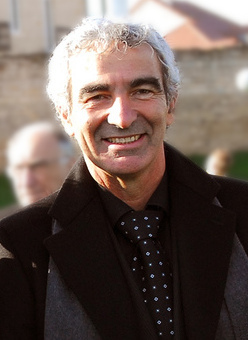
Raymond Domenech, former France national team manager and former Lyon manager.

The following season, Aulas brought in 36-year-old Raymond Domenech, who was born in Lyon and played for the club during the 1970s. Domenech had previously performed well in a player-coach role as manager of Alsatian club Mulhouse. Aulas also brought back Bernard Lacombe, who, now retired, took the position of sporting director. The aspiring chairman gave both Lacombe and Domenech carte blanche to recruit whichever player they saw fit to help the team reach the first division. Domenech, in an effort to increase competition in the squad, brought in several experienced players such as the Congolese striker Eugène Kabongo and François Lemasson, but also focused on the club's youth teaming the veterans with the likes of Bruno Ngotty and Pascal Fugier. Led by 21 goals from Kabongo, the strategy and results were immediate with the club achieving promotion to Ligue 1 after a scoreless draw against Olympique Alès. Lyon were crowned champions of Ligue 2 for the third time.

Lyon's first top-flight season under Domenech saw them finish eighth in the league, safe from relegation, despite struggling early on during the season. In Domenech's second season in the first division, he completed Aulas' plan of reaching Europe finishing in fifth following a victory over Bordeaux at a sold-out Gerland on the last day of the season. Initially, the finish did not insert Lyon into the UEFA Cup, but following Monaco's victory in the 1991 edition of the Coupe de France, a spot opened and allowed Lyon progression. The next season under Domenech was severely underachieving. The club lost in the first round of both the UEFA Cup and Coupe de France losing to Turkish club Trabzonspor (4–8 on aggregate) and Istres, respectively. The club also finished 16th in the league, which is, as of today, still the worst league finish of the Aulas era. Following the 1992–93 Ligue 1 season, where Lyon again finished in the bottom half of the table, Domenech resigned his position and agreed to manage the France under-21 national team.

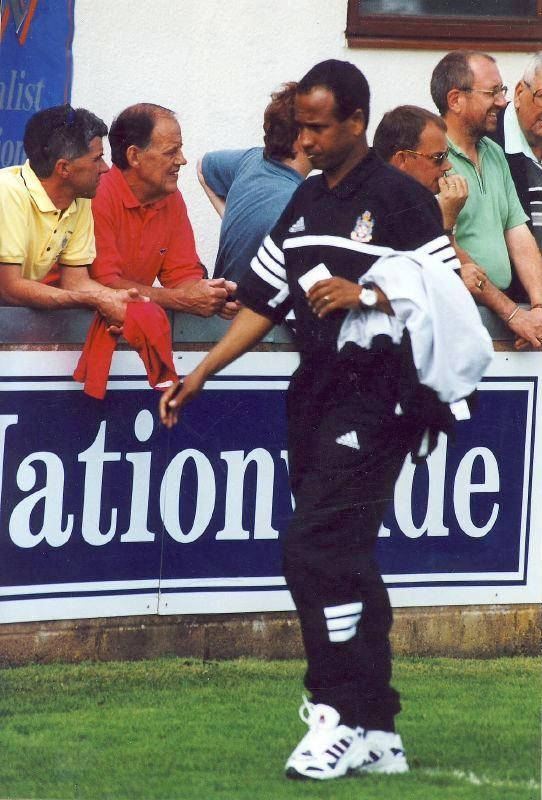
Jean Tigana, former manager of Olympique Lyonnais.

Aulas' first choice replacement was former France national football team and Lyon midfielder Jean Tigana. Tigana had been a part of the celebrated Magic Square, along with Michel Platini, Luis Fernández and Alain Giresse. Tigana's arrival saw the club sign world-class players which included three-time African Footballer of the Year Abédi Pelé, who ultimately disappointed, Manuel Amoros and Pascal Olmeta. All three players had been a part of the Marseille dynasty, which had included five-straight Ligue 1 titles from 1989 to 1993 and a UEFA Champions League victory. In the club's first season under Tigana, they finished eighth, just short of European qualification. The 1994–95 season saw the club become a legitimate title contender. Under the leadership of Ngotty and influential play of youngsters Florian Maurice and Franck Gava, Lyon finished in an impressive second place, ten points behind champions Nantes. The finish meant Lyon have qualified for their second UEFA Cup appearance. The new season also debut a new competition, the Coupe de la Ligue. In the inaugural edition of the competition, Lyon suffered elimination in the round of 16 losing to the eventual winners of the tournament, Paris Saint-Germain. Tigana departed the club after the successful season leaving for Monaco, however, not without leaving an indelible mark on the supporters of the club. His departure also saw others leave. Veteran defenders Ngotty left for Paris and Amoros returned to Marseille. Aulas did keep hold of his young striker tandem Maurice and Gava.

For the 1995–96 season, Guy Stéphan took charge of the club. Stéphan struggled early on losing Gava for the entire season due to an injury. Due to this, the new manager was forced to rely on Maurice and inexperienced youngsters like Ludovic Giuly and Cédric Bardon. Maurice responded scoring 18 goals; however, the next closest player in that category was Giuly with four. The inexperience showed on the field as Lyon finished in 11th position in the league, lost in the second round of the UEFA Cup to English club Nottingham Forest (1–0 on aggregate), and were eliminated in the early stages of the Coupe de France. Despite the unimpressive finishes, Lyon still had a chance to qualify directly to the UEFA Cup, due to reaching the 1996 final of the Coupe de la Ligue. The faced Metz and lost on penalties 4–5. The new season saw the arrival of striker Alain Caveglia, as well as veteran midfielder Christophe Cocard. However, Stéphan again suffered bad luck losing his star striker Maurice for six months after the player ruptured his Achilles tendon following his return from the 1996 Summer Olympics. The lost weakened the team completely and Stéphan was fired following the club's defeat by Auxerre, in which Lyon conceded seven goals. He was promptly replaced by sporting director Bernard Lacombe.

Lacombe quickly changed the environment and style of the team. Though the club endured elimination from both cup competitions early on, they rebounded in the league finishing mid-table in 8th, which meant a berth in the UEFA Intertoto Cup. The season also saw the emergence of Giuly who scored 16 goals, second on the team behind Caveglia (19). Lacombe's first full season in charge was subdued with the club struggling at home, but dominating on the road. The club eventually finished in sixth place, moving above Auxerre on the final day of the season for a guaranteed spot in the UEFA Cup. The club also reached the semi-finals of the Coupe de France. It was the club's best finish in the competition since 1976. In Europe, the club won the Intertoto Cup reaching the second round of the UEFA Cup where they faced the task of defeating Italian outfit Internazionale, who had the likes of Ronaldo and Giuseppe Bergomi in its arsenal. Despite upsetting Inter at the San Siro 2–1, Lyon's home form continue to sulk losing in the return leg 1–3 eliminating Lyon from the tournament. Inter later went on to win the tournament.

The 1998–99 season saw Lyon suffer many highs, but also heartbreaking lows. With the arrival of new players Vikash Dhorasoo and Marco Grassi, Lyon got off to a great start in the league thrashing Toulouse 6–1 and defeating title contenders Marseille and Bordeaux both by a score of 2–1. On 3 February 1999, however, the club received damaging news when it was discovered that Luc Borrelli, one of the team's goalkeepers, was killed in a car accident. Borelli had been a popular figure inside the club and the players were hit hard by the news. Borelli's number 16 shirt was later retired by the club. Despite the tragic news, the players pull together performing admirably in the league finishing in 3rd, which meant the club had qualified for the UEFA Champions League for the first time. The club suffered early elimination in the Coupe de France and Coupe de la Ligue, but reached the quarterfinals of the UEFA Cup losing to another Italian side in Bologna, 0–5 on aggregate.

The mid-to-late 1990s proved to be an enriching but ultimately frustrating learning period for Lyon. The club had become a regular qualifier for European competitions but was making little impact apart from entertaining watchers. Even more disappointingly, the second-place finish of 1994–95 in the French league had not provided the expected foundations for success, the club finishing out of the top-five for the following three campaigns. Third-place finishes followed in 1998–99 and 1999–2000.

=== Rise to prominence ===
At the start of the new millennium, Olympique Lyonnais began to achieve unlimited success in French football. Following the 1998–99 season, Aulas made a big gamble signing the Brazilian international Sonny Anderson from Spanish giants Barcelona for a then-French record fee of €17 million. Sonny Anderson, who was labeled a flop while playing for the Catalan club, had previously had success in Ligue 1 with Monaco and Aulas felt that justified the signing. Aulas later signed Pierre Laigle from Italian club Sampdoria and Tony Vairelles from Lens. The 1999–2000 season saw Lyon begin the season slowly, but eventually the club took control of the league topping the table following the fifth match day. In the club's first appearance in the Champions League, they endured defeat losing 0–3 on aggregate to Slovenian club Maribor. This result shifted the club's European ambitions back to the UEFA Cup, where they made it all the way to the third round defeating Finnish club HJK and Scottish giants Celtic, before losing to German club Werder Bremen.

At the midway point of the season, Lyon were effectively in first place, but on 15 February 2000, the club suffered a disastrous defeat by Nantes losing 1–6. Four days later, the club was eliminated from the Coupe de France losing to Bastia. The club eventually secured another berth in the UEFA Champions League finishing 3rd for the second consecutive season, despite suffering late seasons losses to Nancy and Lens. Sonny Anderson effectively lived up to his price tag bagging 23 league goals.

Following the season, Lacombe departed his position as manager and was replaced by technical director Jacques Santini. Lacombe was later installed as a special advisor to Aulas. Having already shored up the striker position with Sonny, Santini brought in Brazilians Edmílson and Caçapa and also captured Swiss international Patrick Müller in order to solidify the team's midfield and backline. Lyon began the season with three straight draws and midway through the season were in ninth position. In the UEFA Champions League, Santini led the club to their first group stage appearance, where they finished in second place, which meant a spot in the second group stage phase, where they were pitted against the likes of Bayern Munich and English club Arsenal. Despite having a better goal differential than Arsenal, Lyon were eliminated from the tournament due to the club's head-to-head matches. In league and cup play, Lyon managed to go on an 18-match unbeaten streak, which resulted in the club finishing runner-up in the league and also reaching the 2001 final of the Coupe de la Ligue, where they defeated Monaco by a score of 2–1 with new signings Caçapa and Müller getting both goals. The victory earned the club their first major silverware since the 1973 Coupe de France win. The 2001–02 season saw the arrival of Juninho, an unknown in European circles. Santini also brought in the 2001 Player of the Year Eric Carrière and made the decision to increase the playing time of emerging youth product Sidney Govou. The club began the season losing their opening match to title contenders Lens 0–2. The club proceeded to go on a six-match unbeaten streak, which included five wins, to move into first place. In the Champions League, the club finished in third position, which meant a return to the UEFA Cup. In the competition, they lost to Czech club Slovan Liberec in the fourth round. For the majority of the league season, Lyon maintained their second-place positioning and had some scares, which included being saved against Auxerre by Sidney Govou, who scored a 90th-minute goal to give Lyon a 1–0 victory and keep them on par with Lens. The league ultimately came down to the final match day of the season when first-place Lens faced off against second place Lyon at the Stade Gerland on 4 May 2002. The game opened with Govou scoring a goal in just the seventh minute of the play. In the 14th minute, Lyon doubled their lead through Philippe Violeau. Later, despite Lens getting a goal from former Lyonnais Jacek Bąk, they were finished off following a goal from Pierre Laigle.

The 3–1 victory assured Lyon their first-ever Ligue 1 title. It was their first French league title since the 1944–45 season. In an otherwise dormant season for the club, which had gone backwards in its European ambitions, the domestic title was considered as a bright spot. More importantly, it instilled a winning mentality among OL players, who had previously been known to buckle under pressure when it came to key moments of previous seasons. The 2001–02 winning campaign marked the beginning of what would become known among French followers as the "Lyon DNA" for the following few seasons: the ability to overcome deficits, deal blows to their opponents when it mattered the most and win tightly contested games, and a belief among the players that, on the domestic front, they could overcome any kind of adverse circumstances and rally precisely when everything appeared to play against them. This DNA was to play a crucial part in subsequent league successes of 2002–03 and 2003–04, when Lyon came from behind to win the title on each occasion.

A fortnight after the win over Lens, Santini announced that he would be departing the club to take over as manager of the France national football team. On 1 August 2002, Aulas announced the replacement for Santini would be former Rennes manager Paul Le Guen. Le Guen, who had taken a year off after resigning from his hometown club, was highly noted for grooming players such as El Hadji Diouf during his tenure at the club. Le Guen applied those policies to Lyon improving the club's training center, the Centre Tola Vologe, and signing youth players like Hatem Ben Arfa and Demba Touré. Le Guen also gave younger players such as Juninho, Péguy Luyindula and Jérémie Bréchet more prominent roles in the squad. One of Le Guen's more notable signings included signing holding midfielder Mahamadou Diarra from Dutch club Vitesse.

Le Guen began the season capturing the club's second Trophée des champions title after a 5–1 hammering of Lorient. In the league, Lyon recorded big wins over Sedan and Bastia, but fell to as low as 10th position, due to focusing more on the UEFA Champions League, where they again finished in third and were shifted over to the UEFA Cup. Following the Lyon's elimination from the UEFA Cup (0–1 on aggregate to Turkish side Denizlispor) and the domestic cup competitions, the club focused on the league and reached the top of the table with six matches remaining. Facing mounting pressure from rivals Monaco and Marseille, Lyon went on a five-match unbeaten streak, effectively giving the club their second straight Ligue 1 title. Lyon lost the final match of the season to Guingamp 1–4, but the title had already been secured. The club's celebrations were ecstatic having repeated, but later turned to tears as on 26 June 2003, Lyon midfielder Marc-Vivien Foé suffered cardiac arrest while playing for the Cameroon national team at the 2003 FIFA Confederations Cup. The death was even more shocking to some as it occurred at the Stade Gerland. Out of respect, Foé's number 17 was retired.

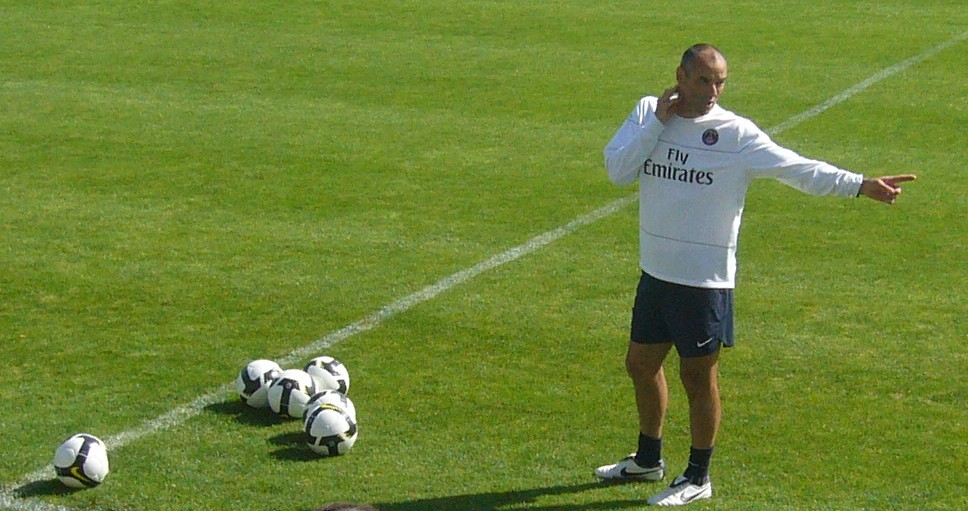
Paul Le Guen, led Lyon to three straight Ligue 1 titles.

Le Guen's second season saw Lyon win their third consecutive league title for the 2003–04 season. Le Guen continued his policy bringing in young good talent signing Florent Malouda, Michael Essien and Anthony Réveillère from Guingamp, Bastia and Valencia respectively. The club also signed veteran Brazilian Giovane Élber and promoted the young left-back Jérémy Berthod to the senior team. In the league, Lyon was mostly dormant during the fall season only reaching the top of the table in the spring on 20 March 2004, following a 1–0 victory over Nantes. The club also were shockingly defeated in Coupe de la Ligue losing to Lens in their opening match on penalties. Lyon, eventually, held on to their hold giving the club their third consecutive Ligue 1 title. The club performed especially well in the newly revamped format of the UEFA Champions League reaching the knockout stages after winning their group, upending the German powerhouse Bayern Munich. In the round of 16, Lyon were pitted against Real Sociedad and defeated the club 2–0 on aggregate advancing to the quarterfinals where they lost to Portuguese club Porto, who ultimately won the competition.

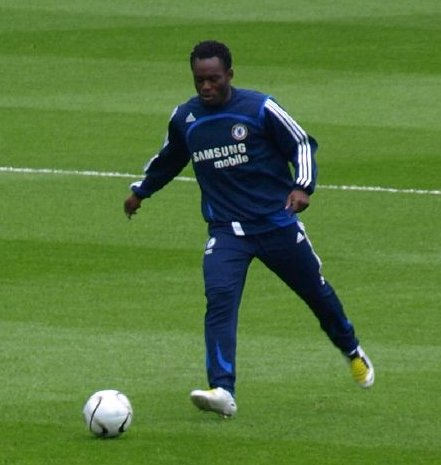
Michael Essien, first Lyon player to be awarded the UNFP Player of the Year award.

=== Domestic domination strengthens, progress in Europe ===
The 2004–05 season saw Lyon win their fourth consecutive Ligue 1 title by a majority margin. With many of his players being linked to clubs abroad, Le Guen openly denounced the rumors keeping his core players at the club and also signing Ligue 1 starlet Eric Abidal from Lille and Sylvain Wiltord and the Brazilian defender Cris and striker Nilmar from abroad. Lyon began the season capturing their third straight Trophée des champions defeating Paris Saint-Germain on penalties and got off to a fast start in the league. By October 2004, the club had easily achieved a sizable lead that they would never give up winning the title by an amazing 12 points. By comparison, in their previous title-winning campaigns of 2002, 2003 and 2004, the club's lead over the second placed team had never exceeded three points.

In the Champions League, the club's dominance on the domestic level was finally shifting to the European level. Lyon cruised through to the knockout rounds losing only to Manchester United, and topping their group ahead of the English giants. In the knockout stages, Lyon dominated Werder Bremen 3–0 in Germany and destroyed them 7–2 at the Gerland. Going into the quarter-finals, Lyon were heavy favorites against Dutch club PSV, but were shockingly held to 1–1 draws in both legs and eventually bowed out on penalties, also penalized by a number of dubious decisions from match officials. On 9 May 2005, with Lyon favorably ahead in the league, Le Guen announced that it would be his final season at the club. He resigned, despite being offered a three-year contract extension by management. Following the season, midfielder Michael Essien was awarded the UNFP Player of the Year award becoming the first Lyon player to achieve this honor.

Just two weeks after Le Guen's announcement, on 29 May 2005, club president Jean-Michel Aulas announced that the club had reached an agreement with former national team and Liverpool manager Gérard Houllier with the latter agreeing to a two-year deal that brought him back to France club football management 17 years after he had left Paris Saint-Germain. Houllier, already equipped with a championship side, brought in strikers Fred and Norwegian John Carew and midfielders Benoît Pedretti from Marseille and Portuguese international Tiago from Chelsea to fill the void of the departed Essien, who moved to Chelsea. The Essien transfer concluded a summer-long transfer battle between the Ghanaian and the club. Houllier, a known youth developer, also increased the playing time of youth products Karim Benzema, Hatem Ben Arfa, and Jérémy Clément. He also inserted Juninho as lead captain.

Lyon began the 2005–06 season going on a 15 match unbeaten streak. This included another Trophée des champions title and victories in the league and Champions League. One of those victories included Lyon humbling Spanish giants Real Madrid 3–0 at the Gerland in front of a sold-out crowd in the club's opening group stage match of the 2005–06 UEFA Champions League. Lyon continued their domination of the group going undefeated. In the league, the club went on unbeaten streaks of seven matches on three occasions. The club reached the top of the table on 28 August 2005 and never gave up the spot winning their final league match 8–1 over Le Mans, in which Fred scored a hat-trick. The victory was, without question, the best of the season, but wasn't required as the club had already secured their league title following the 35th match day. In the end, Lyon captured their fifth consecutive title winning the title by a stunning 15 points. Lyon, however, suffered heartbreak in the cup competitions, losing in the semi-finals of the Coupe de France to rivals Marseille and also suffering elimination from the Champions League in the quarterfinals to Milan, despite being minutes away from advancing to the semi-finals due to an away goal from Mahamadou Diarra. Milan secured the berth with an 88th-minute goal from Filippo Inzaghi. After the season, a Lyon player was awarded the UNFP Player of the Year, for the second straight year with Juninho earning the honor.

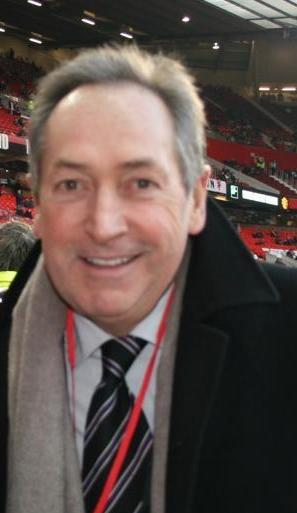
Under Gérard Houllier, Lyon won back-to-back titles in 2006 and 2007

The 2006–07 season saw Lyon increase other clubs' notion that they were a selling club as they lost Diarra to Madrid for approximately €25 million, sold John Carew the previous winter to Aston Villa in a swap deal for Milan Baroš, and let Jérémy Clément leave for Scotland for €2.5 million. Houllier and Aulas, however, replaced these players with Ligue 1 stars. These included the Swede Kim Källström from Rennes, Jérémy Toulalan from Nantes and Alou Diarra from Lens. The season, for the first time in years, saw Lyon perform well in all competitions. In the league, Lyon achieved historic success topping the table at the winter break with a record 50 points. The club reached the quarterfinals of the Coupe de France and made it all the way to the 2007 final of the Coupe de la Ligue, where they lost to Bordeaux 0–1 due to a late goal from Carlos Henrique. In the Champions League, Lyon in the group stage went undefeated for the second straight season. For the first time in three years, Lyon suffered elimination, not in the quarterfinals, but in the round of 16, losing to Roma after being beaten 0–2 at the Gerland by the Giallorossi. Despite struggling during the second half of the league, Lyon maintained their first-place positioning again winning the league, their sixth straight, by double digits. Malouda later completed the hat-trick that season: winning the Player of the Year award becoming the third Lyon player to be bestowed with the honour.

After the season, manager Gérard Houllier's contract expired and he departed. His track record was largely positive: he had not only maintained OL's stronghold on French football, but reinforced it, leading them to record points totals (84 in 2005–06, 81 in 2006–07) and record leads over the second place team (15 and 17 points respectively). Till date, those points tallies remain the highest ever achieved by Lyon under any manager in their league history, something few fans had anticipated at the time of his departure. Houllier's main failure had been the Champions League. In spite of going within seconds of leading OL to their first ever semi-final of the competition in the 2005–06 edition, Houllier's side had ultimately succumbed to late Milan goals. 2006–07 had been even worse, with Roma humbling the France team in the round of 16, signalling Lyon's earliest European exit since the 2002–03 season.

=== League and Cup double amid struggles ===
In need of a replacement, Aulas decided to bring in former Portsmouth manager Alain Perrin, who was coming off a monumental Coupe de France win the previous season with Sochaux. Before the start of the season, Lyon lost several key players. Most notably Malouda, who left for Chelsea, Abidal, who joined Barcelona, Tiago, who departed for Juventus, and Caçapa, who left for Newcastle United on a free transfer. In an effort to replace the players, Aulas continued his strategy of signing the league's top players. Arriving at the club were Lille teammates Mathieu Bodmer and Kader Keïta, who joined for a combined fee of €24.5 million with Keïta being Lyon's highest paid transfer at the time. Other arrivals included 2006 FIFA World Cup winner Fabio Grosso, who joined from Internazionale, César Delgado and Jean-Alain Boumsong with the latter two joining the club during the winter transfer period.

Perrin began the 2007–08 season with the more modern 4–3–3 formation vacating the tactics of the club's previous managers who opted for the more simple 4-3-1-2 formation. Perrin also promoted the youngster Karim Benzema to the lead striker role and converted Hatem Ben Arfa into a left winger in order to relieve Malouda's departure. Due to this, the club struggled to adapt losing two of their opening three matches. Perrin also lost important players Grégory Coupet and Cris to long-term injuries. Following these setbacks, the team, most notably Benzema, rejuvenated itself and went unbeaten in their next ten matches, which put them top of the table, with Benzema scoring nine goals. In the Champions League, the club, just like in the league, struggled early losing 0–3 to both Barcelona and Scottish club Rangers. The club did manage to reach the knockout rounds thanks to back-to-back wins against German club VfB Stuttgart (0–2 and 4–2), a 2–2 home draw with Barcelona, and a massive 3–0 win over Rangers on the final match day at Ibrox Park. In the knockout rounds of the Champions League, Lyon faced Manchester United, and earned a 1–1 draw in the opening leg at home. In the second leg, played at Old Trafford, Lyon held the home side to only one goal, but could not get on the score sheet, thus suffering elimination in the Round of 16 for the second straight season. Manchester United eventually went on to win the competition.

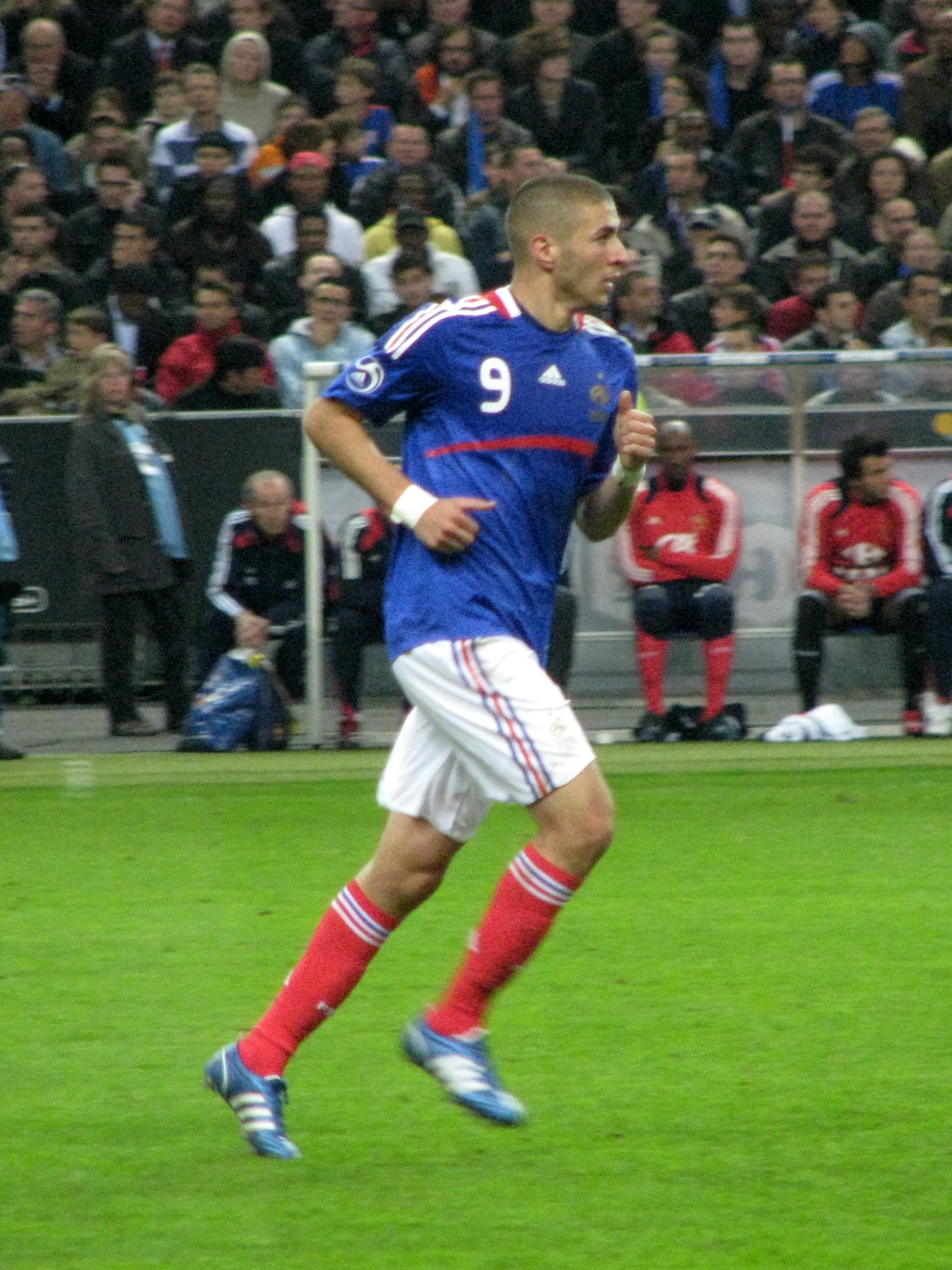
Karim Benzema, the club's primary output during the 2007–08 and 2008–09 seasons

The league season was marked by some erratic performances, disciplinary problems, and by a much less marked domination; Bordeaux emerged as serious contenders for the title and Lyon, despite maintaining first place for the entire season, struggled losing to minnows Caen, Lens, and Le Mans. Lyon were also swept by rivals Marseille, who defeated Lyon 1–2 at the Gerland and hammered them 1–3 at the Velodrome with Lyon's lone goal coming from an own goal by Lorik Cana. The club endured disciplinary issues with Ben Arfa and defender Sébastien Squillaci coming to blows in a training session, as well as the Brazilian Fred's constant undermining of the club's management, which ultimately led to his departure.

Eventually, the league was decided on the final day. In Lyon's match against Auxerre, Benzema scored a goal (his 20th that season in Ligue 1), a mere 24 seconds after kick-off, followed by goals from Fred and Kim Källstrom, securing the league for Lyon. OL finished the season with only 4 points separating them from second placed team, Laurent Blanc's Bordeaux. In fact, they owed their league success largely to the direct results between the two clubs, which had seen Lyon dominate their rivals 3–1 and 4–2. Apart from those two games, Bordeaux had managed to match the Lyonnais' level of performances in the season, something no team had been able to achieve since the 2003–04 season when Paris Saint-Germain and Monaco had finished close to Lyon.

Benzema was later awarded the UNFP Player of the Year becoming the fourth straight Lyon player to accept the honor. In the cup competitions, Lyon performed well, reaching the final eight in the Coupe de la Ligue and also winning the Coupe de France for the first time in more than 30 years. In the final, Lyon faced Paris-Saint Germain and, despite, going through some difficult moments during the match against a side reputed to be cup competition specialists, escaped with a 1–0 (goal scored by Sidney Govou) win in extra-time. The victory over Paris Saint-Germain assured Lyon their first ever double.

In spite of the league and cup double being achieved for the first time in the club's history, 2007–08 was not considered by club supremo Jean-Michel Aulas as a highly satisfactory one. His hopes of seeing the club becoming a European powerhouse had again been dashed, and for the first time in years, the season had been marked by unrest in the dressing room.

Coach Alain Perrin, who had been under pressure from the very beginning of the season with the club struggling unusually in its first league games, was widely expected to lose his job. In fact, it was only his positive results that had managed to keep him in charge till the end of the season. As early as September 2007, he had been rather cruelly nicknamed "PPH: Passera Pas L'Hiver" (French for "Can't Last Beyond Winter") by sections of the French media. Though the trophies won spoke in Perrin's favour, his lack of grip on his players and coaching staff (there were news of clashes involving Hatem Ben Arfa, Joël Bats and Robert Duverne) cast doubt on his ability as a manager. Furthermore, Perrin's chequered record as the manager of another big France club, Marseille, did not help his cause. Taking all those factors into account, Aulas fired him from his job at the end of the season.

With hindsight, Alain Perrin's record no longer seems as negative as it appeared at the time when the events happened. To his credit, he managed to create what was arguably the most entertaining Lyon side to have performed in the French League, in which they scored 74 times, a club record. Conversely, they also conceded more often than in previous seasons (37 goals), a logical consequence of Perrin's highly offensive 4–3–3. Perrin's credentials are further boosted by the several injuries to key players (Cris and Grégory Coupet) throughout the season and the fact that he was the first manager to place such a degree of trust in the talents of Karim Benzema, playing him as his central striker when previous coaches had often been using the attacker in wide positions. In addition, Hatem Ben Arfa, who had complained of being frozen out by Perrin, later clashed with all his subsequent coaches in France (Eric Gerets and Didier Deschamps), thereby clearing the blame which had been placed on Perrin's shoulders at the time when the conflicts were brought to the public's knowledge.

=== The Claude Puel years: dethroned and current state ===
Following the season, it was announced by Aulas that Perrin would not be returning as manager of the team, despite being the first Lyon manager to win the double. Lyon management attributed the firing to "Perrin's several malfunctions that affected the squad daily throughout the season" and their constant failure in Europe. Following an extensive search, which linked the Lyon managerial position to several managers, including former Manchester United assistant and then current Iran national team coach Carlos Queiroz, Brazilian manager Vanderlei Luxemburgo, and former France players and managers Didier Deschamps and Laurent Blanc to name a few, it was announced on 18 June 2008 that Lille manager Claude Puel would succeed Perrin.

Before Puel's arrival as manager, Aulas made several transfers, which included bringing in Nice teammates Ederson and Hugo Lloris, Metz prodigy Miralem Pjanić, and Lille midfielder Jean Makoun. Following Puel's arrival, the club brought in the Ghanaian defender John Mensah and Monaco striker Frédéric Piquionne. The additions were later offset by the departure of veterans Sébastien Squillaci, Grégory Coupet, and Patrick Müller, as well as youngster Hatem Ben Arfa, who joined rivals Marseille.

Lyon began Puel's reign in negative fashion losing their first Trophée des Champions, after having won six straight, to Bordeaux. In the league, Lyon opened the season going on a seven match unbeaten streak before being embarrassed by Rennes in what the media described as a "thrashing". Lyon responded positively to the loss going on another unbeaten run, this time of six matches, but, following a surprise loss to Paris Saint-Germain went on a three-match win-less streak, which included a loss to relegation strugglers Nantes. With rivals Bordeaux and Marseille on their tracks, Lyon again responded going on a nine match unbeaten streak allowing the club to maintain their first-place position. In the Champions League, Lyon, unlike last year, went unbeaten in their first five matches drawing the first two against Bayern Munich and Fiorentina and winning the next three scoring seven goals in two matches against Romanian club Steaua București and defeating Fiorentina 2–1. In the knockout rounds, Lyon, for the second straight season, were provided a tough test going against Barcelona. Despite controlling the first leg at the Gerland, which ended 1–1, Lyon were hammered 2–5 in the second leg by the Catalans, who later won the competition.

In the cup competitions, Lyon were embarrassed by second division club Metz losing their opening match in the Coupe de la Ligue 1–3. In the Coupe de France, Lyon defeated Marseille in the round of 32. In the ensuing round, they suffered defeat by Lille 2–3, despite coming back from a goal down on two occasions. Lyon later lost to Lille in the league a mere three days later and, on 11 April 2009, following a draw with Monaco, lost their grip on first-place position. Lyon followed the draw by going on a three-match winless streak, which included a loss to title contenders Bordeaux and a disastrous defeat by Valenciennes, which effectively eliminated the club from title contention. Despite going undefeated in their final four matches, Lyon finished in 3rd position behind Marseille and champions Bordeaux. The finish ended an impressive streak of seven successive titles. For the first time since the 1999–2000 season, the club finished out of the top two. However, by winning 3–1 at the Vélodrome against Marseille on 17 May, they helped Bordeaux take the lead and eventually win the league, thus gaining the satisfaction of having hurt bitter rivals Marseille's chances in both the Coupe de France and Ligue 1.

The following season would bring no such domestic satisfaction as this time, Marseille did manage to win the league for the first time since 1992, with Didier Deschamps at the helm. On their way to the title, the Mediterranean club beat Lyon 2–1 in March to begin an impressive run of successes that proved to be decisive. For Lyon, the fact that the title was won by their rivals made the fall from grace experienced since 2008 under Claude Puel even more bitter. Their second-place finish with 72 points offered little consolation.

Performances in the Champions League proved to be the season's biggest satisfaction, though the Lyonnais' run ended abruptly with a 3–0 semi-final loss at the Stade de Gerland against Bayern Munich (0–4 loss on aggregate). Lyon's run in the competition included a memorable win at Liverpool in October 2009, making them the second France club to win a game at Anfield after Marseille in October 2007. The club finished second of its group behind Fiorentina and was drawn against Real Madrid for the round of 16. Despite odds being heavily stacked against them for the tie, France took a surprise lead when Jean Makoun scored a long-range effort. They held on to their lead, but were still expected to be eliminated in the second leg with the Spanish giants playing at their home ground. At the Santiago Bernabéu Stadium, Real Madrid took an early lead through Cristiano Ronaldo and looked like they would easily get past their opponents. However, Lyon produced a resilient performance and managed to keep their deficit to one goal. In the final 15 minutes, Miralem Pjanić scored from close range to give his side a crucial away goal. The match finished 1–1 and Lyon advanced to the quarter-finals. With the win at Liverpool, the qualification over two legs against Real Madrid turned out to be the highest point of Claude Puel's stint as club manager. In the quarter-finals, Lyon eliminated fellow French side Bordeaux, winning the first leg 3–1 at home and losing the second leg in Bordeaux 0–1. This was followed by Lyon's elimination by Bayern Munich.

In the summer of 2010, Jean-Michel Aulas' marquee signing was playmaker Yoann Gourcuff from Bordeaux, following a lengthy negotiation process. Jimmy Briand also arrived on a free transfer from Rennes. Having endured a poor 2009–10 season which had culminated in a shambolic 2010 FIFA World Cup campaign in South Africa, Gourcuff was expected to revive his career in Lyon. However, he failed to perform to the expected level, seemingly unable to shake off his disappointing World Cup campaign. Another player struggling to deal with the aftermath of that World Cup was Jérémy Toulalan, who used to be one of the club's most reliable performers.

2010–11 ended up as the club's worst season since they became genuine title contenders in the early 2000s. For the first time since the French league had reverted to 20 clubs (that is, 2002–03), Lyon ended the season with less than 65 points, with 64. The previous worst had been 68 in 2002–03, a tally that had been enough for the club to win the league at the time. Only the erratic form of direct competitors Paris Saint-Germain allowed the Lyonnais to hang on to third place, qualifying them for the preliminary round of the 2011–12 Champions League. In the Champions League, Lyon again met Real Madrid in the round of 16, but failed to reproduce the upset of 2009–10. After a 1–1 draw at the Gerland, the Gônes were soundly beaten 3–0 in the Spanish capital. Progress in the Coupe de la Ligue and Coupe de France was also unsatisfactory.

For the first time since Jean-Michel Aulas purchased the club in 1987, fans revolted against the manager in charge. Claude Puel was repeatedly attacked through banners deployed in home games that lambasted his record. During a game at Gerland against Caen in the spring of 2011, towards the end of the season, OL supporter groups produced several banners directed at Puel, including one that read, "Puel, la seule chose que t'aies gagné à Lyon c'est l'argent" ("Puel, the only thing you managed to win in Lyon was money"). The banner was deployed 20 minutes before the match ended, and this was followed by thousands of fans leaving the stands. In the same match, the fans had chanted the name of Gérard Houllier, who for them was a symbol of the club in the days when it used to win games with dazzling performances. Earlier in the season, following a derby loss at home against Saint-Étienne, Aulas had to calm down fans who were asking for the manager's head.

In June 2008, Aulas had appointed Puel as an English-style manager with broader prerogatives than usually allowed for France managers. In spite of disappointing results, especially during the 2010–11 season, he kept repeating that Puel would see out his contract that ran until the summer of 2012. However, in the spring of 2011, a separation between the two parties was already looking inevitable. Puel could not see eye to eye with the fans, who perceived him as a man from the south who had ruined their club and ended its dominance on the French football scene. He suffered the ignominy of becoming the first OL manager since Bernard Lacombe to have a trophyless career on the Gerland bench. However, unlike Lacombe, Puel had arrived at the club at a time when it was the top side in France and with millions spent on transfers such as Hugo Lloris, Ederson, John Mensah, Miralem Pjanić, Lisandro López, Bafétimbi Gomis, Michel Bastos, Aly Cissokho, Dejan Lovren and Yoann Gourcuff, he had a moral duty to bring home trophies, which he failed to do.

In addition, the former Monaco manager was handicapped by his poor communication skills and his apparent lack of enthusiasm during media events. His tactics were perceived as negative and for the first time in decades, Lyon were being associated with boring football. His relationship with players was equally poor, to the point that during the 2010–11 season, no one would speak out in defence of him when he was criticized by fans or the media. Several players, including Yoann Gourcuff, hinted that their poor form could partly be explained by disagreements with the coach's tactics. Finally, Puel also took a lot of stick for his excessively physical training regimes that led to a lot of muscular injuries in the course of the 2010–11 season.

Taking into account that poor record on all counts, Jean-Michel Aulas was forced to reconsider his initial plans. On 15 June 2011, Lyon began procedures to end Puel's contract. On 20 June 2011, Puel vacated his post, but both parties are still negotiating over his severance allowance. Former Lyon and Arsenal player Rémi Garde has taken over as club manager, with the primary aim of repairing the damage done by Puel's reign.
