= Dobrivoje Trivić =

Yugoslav and Serbian footballer (1943–2013)

Personal information
- Full name: Dobrivoje Trivić
- Date of birth: 26 October 1943
- Place of birth: Ševarice, German-occupied Serbia
- Date of death: 26 February 2013 (aged 69)
- Place of death: Novi Sad, Serbia
- Height: 1.70 m (5 ft 7 in)
- Position: Midfielder

Youth career
- Mačvanska Mitrovica

Senior career*
Years	Team	Apps	(Gls)
1962–1965	Srem	84	(22)
1965–1971	Vojvodina	156	(31)
1971–1973	Lyon	55	(2)
1973–1974	Toulouse	18	(10)
1974–1975	Vojvodina	1	(0)
Total		314	(65)

International career
1966–1969	Yugoslavia	13	(0)

Managerial career
- 1978–1979: Bačka 1901
Medal record
Silver medal – second place	UEFA European Championship	1968
- * Club domestic league appearances and goals

Dobrivoje Trivić (Serbian Cyrillic: Добривоје Тривић; 26 October 1943 – 26 February 2013) was a Yugoslav and Serbian professional footballer who played as a midfielder.

== Club career ==
After spending three seasons with Srem in the Yugoslav Second League, Trivić joined Yugoslav First League side Vojvodina in 1965, helping the club win its first championship title in his first season. He played for Vojvodina until 1971, before moving abroad to France. Over the next two seasons at Lyon, Trivić collected 55 appearances and netted two goals in the French Division 1. He also helped the club win the Coupe de France in 1972–73, scoring the opening goal in the final. Following his stint at Toulouse in the French Division 2, Trivić returned to Vojvodina and retired soon after, aged 31.

== International career ==
At international level, Trivić was capped 13 times for Yugoslavia between 1966 and 1969. He was a member of the team at UEFA Euro 1968, as the nation finished as runners-up.

== Personal life ==
After retiring as a player, Trivić worked as an assistant to Todor Veselinović and later as a salesman in a chocolate factory. He died in 2013.

== Career statistics ==
=== Club ===
Appearances and goals by club, season and competition
Club	Season	League			Cup		Continental		Total	
Club	Season	Division	Apps	Goals	Apps	Goals	Apps	Goals	Apps	Goals
Srem	1962–63	Yugoslav Second League	25	7			—		25	7
Srem	1963–64	Yugoslav Second League	29	8	—		—		29	8
Srem	1964–65	Yugoslav Second League	30	7	—		—		30	7
Srem	Total		84	22			—		84	22
Vojvodina	1965–66	Yugoslav First League	28	7			—		28	7
Vojvodina	1966–67	Yugoslav First League	27	5			6	0	33	5
Vojvodina	1967–68	Yugoslav First League	26	4			7	3	33	7
Vojvodina	1968–69	Yugoslav First League	31	7			2	0	33	7
Vojvodina	1969–70	Yugoslav First League	30	8			2	0	32	8
Vojvodina	1970–71	Yugoslav First League	14	0			—		14	0
Vojvodina	Total		156	31			17	3	173	34
Lyon	1971–72	French Division 1	26	2			—		26	2
Lyon	1972–73	French Division 1	29	0	8	3	—		37	3
Lyon	Total		55	2	8	3	—		63	5
Toulouse	1973–74	French Division 2	18	10			—		18	10
Vojvodina	1974–75	Yugoslav First League	1	0			—		1	0
Career total			314	65	8	3	17	3	339	71

=== International ===
Appearances and goals by national team and year
National team	Year	Apps	Goals
Yugoslavia	1966	2	0
Yugoslavia	1967	0	0
Yugoslavia	1968	8	0
Yugoslavia	1969	3	0
Total		13	0

== Honours ==
Vojvodina

- Yugoslav First League: 1965–66

Lyon

- Coupe de France: 1972–73

Yugoslavia

- UEFA European Championship runner-up: 1968
