= 1973 Coupe de France final =

- Event: 1972–73 Coupe de France
| Lyon | Nantes |
| 2 | 1 |
- Date: 17 June 1973
- Venue: Parc des Princes, Paris
- Referee: Robert Wurtz
- Attendance: 45,734

The 1973 Coupe de France final was a football match held at Parc des Princes, Paris on 17 June 1973. It saw Lyon defeat FC Nantes 2–1, thanks to goals by Dobrivoje Trivić and Bernard Lacombe.

== Match details ==
17 June 1973

| Lyon | 2–1 | Nantes |
|---|---|---|
| Trivić 29'; Lacombe 63' | | Couécou 86' |

Parc des Princes, Paris
Attendance: 45,734
Referee: Robert Wurtz

| GK | (France) Yves Chauveau |
| DF | (France) Raymond Domenech |
| DF | (Socialist Federal Republic of Yugoslavia) Ljubomir Mihajlović |
| DF | (Italy) Roberto Cacchioni |
| DF | (France) Bernard Lhomme |
| MF | (France) Georges Prost |
| MF | (Socialist Federal Republic of Yugoslavia) Dobrivoje Trivić |
| MF | (France) Serge Chiesa |
| MF | (France) Bernard Lacombe |
| FW | (France) Fleury Di Nallo | (c) |
| FW | (France) Daniel Ravier |
Substitutes:
Manager:
(France) Aimé Mignot Assistant Referees: Fourth Official:

| GK | (France) Jean-Paul Bertrand-Demanes |
| DF | (France) Jean-Claude Osman |
| DF | (France) Gabriel De Michele |
| DF | (Argentina) Ángel Bargas |
| DF | (France) Bernard Gardon |
| MF | (France) Michel Pech |
| MF | (France) Bernard Blanchet |
| MF | (France) Henri Michel | (c) |
| FW | (France) Didier Couécou |
| FW | (France) Gilles Rampillon |
| FW | (West Germany) Erich Maas |
Substitutes:
Manager:
(France) José Arribas

== See also ==
- 1972–73 Coupe de France
