= Georges Carnus =

French footballer (born 1940)

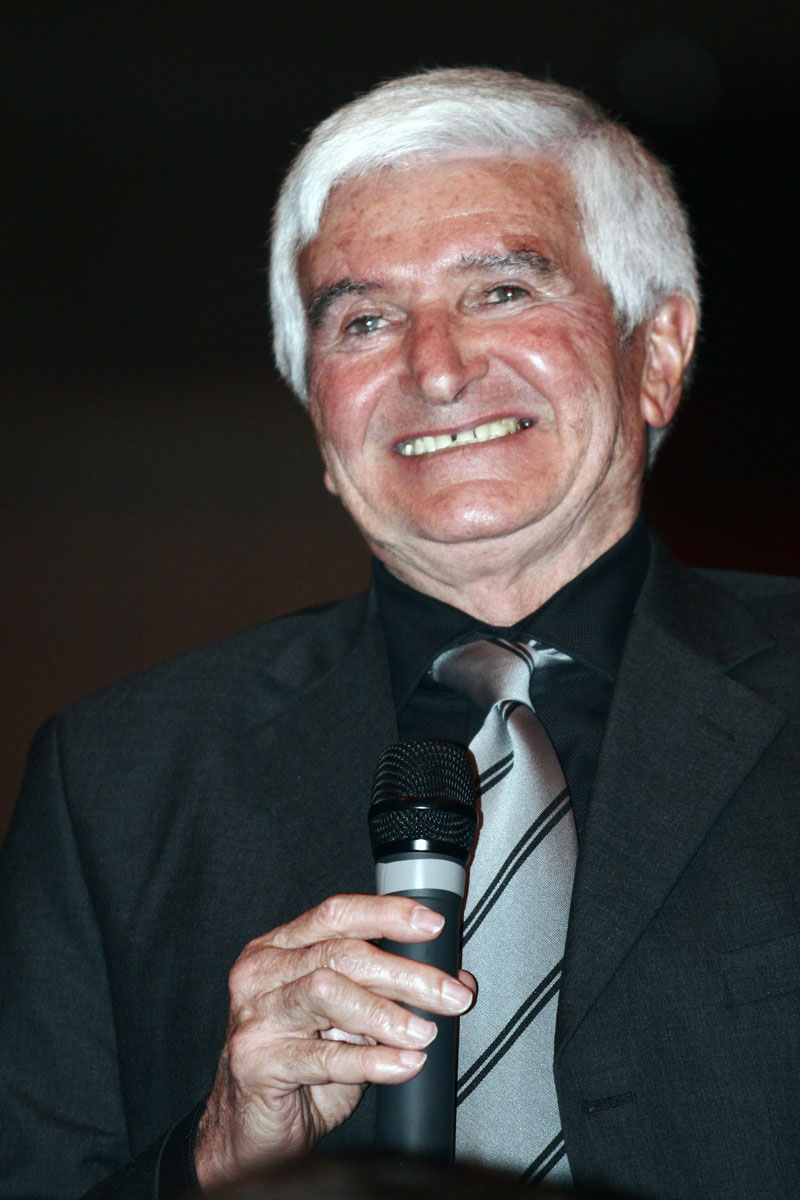

Personal information
- Date of birth: 13 August 1940 (age 86)
- Place of birth: Gignac-la-Nerthe, Bouches-du-Rhône, France
- Height: 1.78 m (5 ft 10 in)
- Position: Goalkeeper

Senior career*
Years	Team	Apps	(Gls)
1958–1962	Aix	77	(0)
1962–1967	Stade Français	171	(0)
1967–1971	Saint-Étienne	130	(0)
1971–1974	Marseille	109	(0)

International career
1963–1973	France	36	(0)
- * Club domestic league appearances and goals

Georges Carnus (born 13 August 1940) is a French former professional footballer who played as goalkeeper. At international level, he made 36 appearances for the France national team.

== Career ==
Carnus was part of the France national team's squad for the 1966 FIFA World Cup in England where he remained Marcel Aubour's substitute. He later signed with AS Saint-Étienne, winning his first titles. His successes with les Verts and his talent as a goalkeeper allowed him to take Aubour's titular spot in France's goal after the 1966 World Cup.In 1971, he surprisingly left Saint-Étienne, along with teammate Bernard Bosquier for Olympique de Marseille. Their combination in l'OM's defense was full of success, and Marseille won French Division 1 and Coupe de France in 1972.

== Honours ==
Saint-Étienne

- Division 1: 1967–68, 1968–69, 1969–70
- Coupe de France: 1967–68, 1969–70

Marseille

- Division 1: 1971–72
- Coupe de France: 1971–72
