= Privlaka =

Privlaka may refer to:

- Privlaka, Vukovar-Syrmia County, Croatia
- Privlaka, Zadar County, Croatia

== See also ==
- Prevlaka
