= Château de Langoiran =

13th century castle in France

Coordinates: 44°41′57″N 0°22′54″W

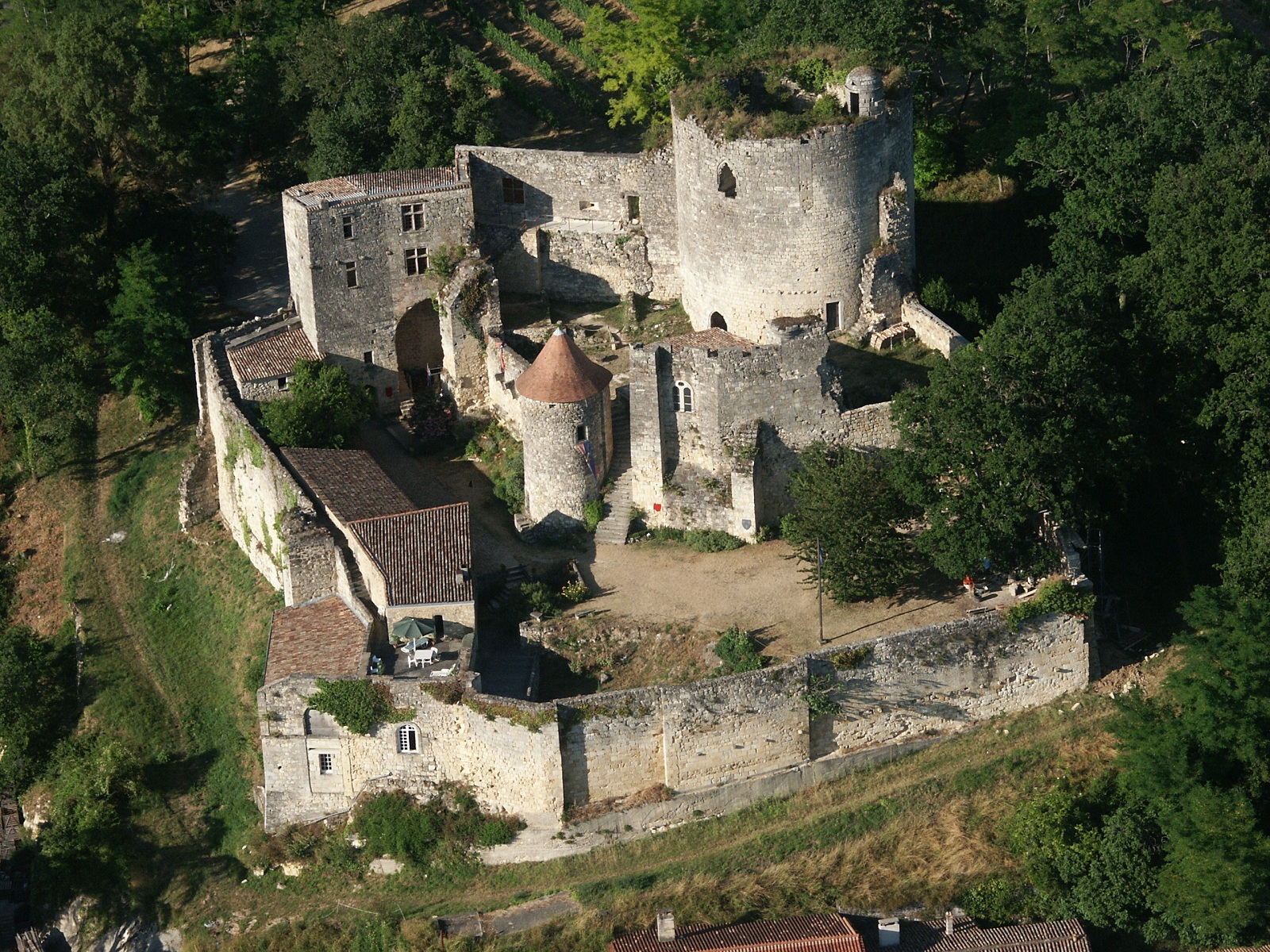
Château de Langoiran

The Château de Langoiran is located in the district of Bordeaux in Gironde, in Langoiran, Aquitaine, France. The "donjon" of the castle (fortified central tower) is one of the largest in France. It overlooks the Garonne Valley and offers a good view for visitors. It has been listed as a French Monument Historique since May 1892.

== History ==
This castle was built in the 13th century by the Escoussans family, one of the most famous families of Gascony. The castle of Langoiran was owned successively by the families of Escoussans, Albret (from 1345 to 1378), and Montferrand (from 1378 to 1590). Bertrand III de Montferrand was Soudan de la Trau. He married Isabelle de Preissac, daughter of Arnaud de Preissac, Soudan de La Trau, (member of the Order of the Garter) and Marguerite of Stratton (daughter of John of Stratton).

After being ruined by multiple unsuccessful wars, the owners were forced to sell their land and the castle to a gentry family from Bordeaux: the Arnoulds. The castle of Langoiran and its seignory were mentioned as early as the 11th century. The older parts of the remaining castle date from the 13th century and the Renaissance.

The seignory of Langoiran was one of the most famous and powerful of the Duchy of Aquitaine. For centuries, it had been involved in quarrels between the kings of France and England, both hoping to obtain its accession. When the Duchy of Aquitaine belonged to the English kings and not to the Kingdom, the successors of Henry II Plantagenet were called "Kings of England and Aquitaine".

The Lords of Langoiran always supported the King-Duke, other than Bérard d'Albret, who had to fight at the end of his life on behalf of the King of France.
