= Josip Skoblar =

Croatian football player and manager (born 1941)

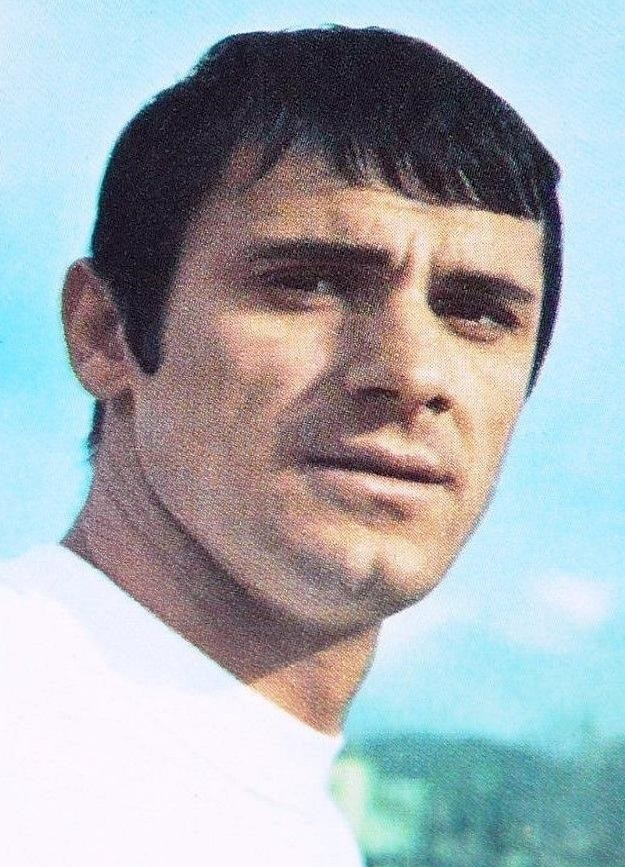
- Skoblar in 1970

Personal information
- Full name: Josip Skoblar
- Date of birth: 12 March 1941 (age 85)
- Place of birth: Privlaka, Yugoslavia (now Croatia)
- Height: 1.77 m (5 ft 10 in)
- Position: Forward

Team information
- Current team: Marseille (scout)

Youth career
- 1956–1958: Zadar

Senior career*
Years	Team	Apps	(Gls)
1958–1959	Zadar		
1959–1966	OFK Belgrade	162	(63)
1966–1970	Hannover 96	57	(30)
1966–1967	→ Marseille (loan)	15	(13)
1969–1974	Marseille	159	(138)
1974–1977	Rijeka	36	(11)
Total		429	(254)

International career
1961–1967	Yugoslavia	32	(11)

Managerial career
- 1977–1978: Marseille (technical manager)
- 1979–1981: Orijent
- 1983–1986: Rijeka
- 1986–1987: Hajduk Split
- 1987: Hamburger SV
- 1988: Čelik Zenica
- 1988–1989: Dinamo Zagreb
- 1989: Real Valladolid
- 1990–1991: Hajduk Split
- 1991–1992: Famalicão
- 1994: NK Zagreb
- 1994: Nîmes
- 1995–1996: Rijeka
- 1998: Zadarkomerc
- 2000: Lebanon
- 2001: Marseille
- * Club domestic league appearances and goals

Josip Skoblar (born 12 March 1941) is a Croatian former professional football player and manager. He was primarily a forward, and also capable of playing on both wings. In 1971, he won the European Golden Shoe with 44 goals.

He played for Zadar, OFK Belgrade, Hannover 96, Marseille and NK Rijeka. While playing at Marseille, Skoblar won the French First Division twice (1970–71, 1971–72), 1971 Challenge des Champions and 1972 Coupe de France. He was also the league top goalscorer three consecutive seasons (1970–71, 1971–72, 1972–73). In 2009, he was inaugurated into the Olympique de Marseille Hall of Fame and in 2010 he was put into "The Dream Team 110 years of Olympique de Marseille". Skoblar is also part of the all time XI of OFK Belgrade and NK Rijeka.

At the international level, Skoblar played for Yugoslavia appearing in 32 matches and scoring 11 goals. He was in the national team at the 1962 FIFA World Cup where they finished in fourth place losing to Czechoslovakia in the semi-final.

As a manager, he managed NK Orijent, HNK Rijeka, Hamburger SV, Čelik Zenica, Dinamo Zagreb, Real Valladolid, Famalicão, NK Zagreb, Nîmes, Zadarkomerc, Marseille, Lebanon national team and Hajduk Split, with whom he won two Yugoslav Cups (1987, 1991).

== Playing career ==
=== Club ===
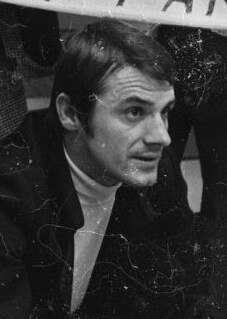
Skoblar in 1971

Skoblar was born in Privlaka near Zadar (at the time in Banovina of Croatia). He started his career with NK Zadar (1957–58). He got spotted there by OFK Beograd goalie Perica Radenković who was serving his mandatory army stint in Zadar. Radenković recommended Skoblar to club management and the 19-year-old was soon on his way to Belgrade. With OFK Beograd Skoblar won the Yugoslav Cup in 1962 and 1966. In Germany he played for Hannover 96 (1967–70). In 57 games in Bundesliga, he scored 30 goals.

He wanted to play in Marseille, but the chairman of Hannover refused. Marcel Leclerc, chairman of Marseille, went to Hannover on a journey and came back with the player, it was the beginning of an adventure with Marseille. The player was applauded at the airport by many fans.

In France, Skoblar played for Marseille and was three time top goalscorer in Ligue 1 (1971–73). Skoblar won the European Golden Boot in 1971 for 44 goals in Ligue 1, he still remains as the best scorer in a season in Ligue 1. With Marseille, he won the French league title in 1971, and French league and cup title in 1972. OM fans refer to him as "l'Aigle Dalmate", "l'Aigle Dalmate"/"l'aigle des Dalmates" (The Dalmatian Eagle), or "Monsieur Goal" (Mister Goal).

He left OM after the arrival of the two Brazilians Jairzinho and Paulo César, winners of the FIFA World Cup in 1970.

Skoblar joined NK Rijeka in the summer of 1974. He played for the club until 1977 accumulating 37 appearances and scoring 11 goals in league and Cup.

=== International ===
For Yugoslavia Skoblar played between 1961 and 1967. In 32 games for Yugoslavia, he scored 11 goals. Skoblar participated in World Cup 1962. Skoblar scored one goal, and Yugoslavia finished in the fourth place. He first played for the national team on 7 May 1961, in a friendly match against Hungary. He ended his international career on 7 October 1967 against West Germany, before the end of the Euro 68 qualification competition. The Yugoslavia national football team ended 2nd of the Euro 1968 without him.

== Style of play ==
When he came to OFK Belgrade he was assigned left winger (outside left) position, because of his versatility, technique and speed. While being a winger he continued to score goals although as winger he couldn't completely fulfill his goalscoring potential. While at Marseille he was moved to centre forward while being able to play all forward positions. Skoblar was very well known scoring with headers. He was also a solid dribbler with tremendous speed.

== Reputation ==
Just Fontaine speaking about Josip: "When I watched him front of the goal, each time, I was thinking, kick from the inside of the left foot, ... from the outside of the right foot ... a header, now! ... he had already done it ... scoring each time, exactly by the only possible way, and in just a split second. In the last 30 years, he has been the only striker that I've seen like that in France."

== Managerial career ==
With his playing career over, he came back to Marseille, and became technical manager in 1977 under manager Ivan "Ðalma" Marković. Due to an internal conflict he left the club after one season to pursue a career as a manager. He began his career as a manager in third tier club NK Orijent in Rijeka. He took the club to the quarter-final of the 1981 Yugoslav Cup beating NK Zagreb and OFK Beograd. In the quarter-final Orijent lost to Budućnost Titograd of penalties.

Skoblar joined NK Rijeka in May 1983 replacing Marijan Brnčić. He concluded the last six matches of 1982–83 season and saved the club from relegation and finished at 15 place. In his second season at the club Skoblar nearly won the League short three point from first placed Red Star Belgrade, Rijeka finished in fourth place behind Željezničar and Partizan. This result was the club best league result since 1965–66, they also reached the quarter-final of Yugoslav Cup and qualified for UEFA Cup.

On 24 October Rijeka beat Real Madrid 3:1 in the second round of the UEFA Cup. This match made Skoblar reputation with the supporters and club rise to a status of legend. In their away match against the Spanish side they lost 3:1 with Real Madrid advancing and eventually winning the Cup. Many of the players and Skoblar himself have stated that they were cheated from victory by the referee. The season ended with the club at a mid-table eight place, four points shy of a European qualification.

1985–86 season started out poorly with losses in the league and elimination in the second round of the Cup. During the second part of the season Skoblar managed to secure fifth place with the club and secured a place in the UEFA Cup. Rijeka was eliminated during the first round of the 1986–87 UEFA Cup by Standard Liège. Mid-season Rijeka was in tenth place in the league and had reached the semi-final in the Cup. Skoblar left the club in December 1986.

He later became head coach for Hajduk Split with whom he won 2 Yugoslavia Cups. With Hamburger SV he lost DFB Supercup in 1987. In 1988 he managed Čelik Zenica and saved them from relegation.

He also had short stints in Spain with Real Valladolid and Portugal with F.C. Famalicão. He also coached Croatian clubs Dinamo Zagreb, NK Zagreb, Zadarkomerc and HNK Rijeka. At his second stint at Rijeka Skoblar's results were unfavorable so he was sacked after two months in 1995. Later during the year in October he was again set as manager of Rijeka but was again sacked due to results in February 1996. Years later Skoblar stated that he wasn't given enough freedom by the (then) president of the club Hrvoje Šarinić to work properly with the team.

He is employed at the Marseille since 2001 as scout, and he is now close to retirement. During the summer 2001, he was with Marc Levy the co-manager of the team for 3 days, few days before the nomination of Tomislav Ivić. He managed the Lebanon national football team. He joined them in March 2000 and got sacked later in the year (October) after failing to qualify to the second round of the 2000 AFC Asian Cup.

== Personal life ==
Skoblar owns a family restaurant with his brother in Zadar.

== Career statistics ==
=== Club ===
Appearances and goals by club, season and competition
Club	Season	League			Cup (Note: Includes Yugoslav Cup, Coupe de France, DFB-Pokal.)		Continental		Total	
Club	Season	Division	Apps	Goals	Apps	Goals	Apps	Goals	Apps	Goals
OFK Beograd	1959–60	Yugoslav First League	18	5	2	0	–		20	5
OFK Beograd	1960–61	Yugoslav First League	22	5	2	1	–		24	6
OFK Beograd	1961–62	Yugoslav First League	21	8	5	2	–		26	10
OFK Beograd	1962–63	Yugoslav First League	22	11	2	0	9	5	33	16
OFK Beograd	1963–64	Yugoslav First League	26	16	1	0	3	0	30	16
OFK Beograd	1964–65	Yugoslav First League	26	10	3	2	2	1	31	13
OFK Beograd	1965–66	Yugoslav First League	27	8	5	5	–		32	13
OFK Beograd	1966–67	Yugoslav First League	1	0	0	0	–		1	0
OFK Beograd	Total		163	63	20	10	14	6	197	79
Marseille	1966–67	Division 1	16	13	3	4	–		19	17
Hannover 96	1967–68	Bundesliga	21	9	1	0	–		22	9
Hannover 96	1968–69	Bundesliga	26	17	3	3	4	3	33	23
Hannover 96	1969–70	Bundesliga	10	4	0	0	2	1	11	5
Hannover 96	Total		57	30	4	3	5	4	66	37
Marseille	1969–70	Division 1	15	13	3	4	–		18	17
Marseille	1970–71	Division 1	36	44	8	5	2	0	46	49
Marseille	1971–72	Division 1	31	30	9	8	4	2	44	40
Marseille	1972–73	Division 1	31	26	4	2	1	0	36	28
Marseille	1973–74	Division 1	33	20	0	0	4	3	37	23
Marseille	1974–75	Division 1	12	5	0	0	0	0	12	5
Marseille	Total		158	138	24	19	11	5	193	162
Rijeka	1974–75	Yugoslav First League	14	6	0	0	–		14	6
Rijeka	1975–76	Yugoslav First League	21	5	1	0	–		22	5
Rijeka	1976–77	Yugoslav First League	1	0	0	0	–		1	0
Rijeka	Total		36	11	1	0	0	0	37	11
Total			430	254	52	36	29	15	511	305

=== International ===
Appearances and goals by national team and year
National team	Year	Apps	Goals
Yugoslavia	1961	1	0
Yugoslavia	1962	9	3
Yugoslavia	1963	5	2
Yugoslavia	1964	6	3
Yugoslavia	1965	4	0
Yugoslavia	1966	4	1
Yugoslavia	1967	3	2
[Total		32	11

Scores and results list Yugoslavia's goal tally first, score column indicates score after each Skoblar goal.

List of international goals scored by Josip Skoblar
No.	Date	Venue	Opponent	Score	Result	Competition
1	16 May 1962	Stadion JNA, Belgrade, Yugoslavia	East Germany	2 – 0	3–1	Friendly
2	2 June 1962	Estadio Carlos Dittborn, Arica, Chile	Uruguay	1–1	3–1	1962 FIFA World Cup
3	4 November 1962	JNA Stadium, Belgrade, Yugoslavia	Belgium	1–0	3–2	1964 European Nations' Cup qualifying
4	4 November 1962	JNA Stadium, Belgrade, Yugoslavia	Belgium	2–1	3–2	1964 European Nations' Cup qualifying
5	6 October 1963	Stadion JNA, Belgrade, Yugoslavia	Hungary	1–0	2–0	Friendly
6	3 November 1963	Stadion Maksimir, Zagreb, Yugoslavia	Czechoslovakia	2–0	2–0	Friendly
7	17 May 1964	Stadion Československé Armády, Prague, Czechoslovakia	Czechoslovakia	1–0	3–2	Friendly
8	25 October 1964	Praterstadion, Vienna, Austria	Australia	2–2	2–3	Friendly
9	27 September 1964	Népstadion, Budapest, Hungary	Hungary	1–2	1–2	Friendly
10	8 May 1966	Stadion Maksimir, Zagreb, Yugoslavia	Hungary	2–0	2–0	Friendly
11	3 May 1967	Red Star Stadium, Belgrade, Yugoslavia	West Germany	1–0	1–0	UEFA Euro 1968 qualifying

== Managerial statistics ==
As of 4 September 2017

Club	From	To	Competition	Record				
Club	From	To	Competition	P	W	D	L	Win %
NK Orijent	1979	1981	Croatian Republic League	60	25	15	20	41.67
NK Orijent	1979	1981	Yugoslav Cup	3	2	1	0	66.67
NK Orijent Total				63	27	16	20	42.86
NK Rijeka	22 May 1983	14 December 1986	First League	125	50	39	36	40.00
NK Rijeka	22 May 1983	14 December 1986	Yugoslav Cup	11	5	5	1	45.45
NK Rijeka	22 May 1983	14 December 1986	UEFA Cup	6	2	1	3	33.33
NK Rijeka Total				142	57	45	40	40.14
Hajduk Split	22 February 1987	14 June 1987	First League	17	9	2	6	52.94
Hajduk Split	22 February 1987	14 June 1987	Yugoslav Cup	3	1	1	1	33.33
Hajduk Split Total				20	10	3	7	50.00
Hamburger SV	28 July 1987	9 November 1987	Bundesliga	15	5	4	6	33.33
Hamburger SV	28 July 1987	9 November 1987	DFB-Pokal	2	2	0	0	100.00
Hamburger SV	28 July 1987	9 November 1987	DFB-Supercup	1	0	0	1	0.00
Hamburger SV Total				18	7	4	7	38.89
Čelik Zenica	6 March 1988	12 June 1988	First League	17	8	2	7	47.06
Čelik Zenica Total				17	8	2	7	47.06
Dinamo Zagreb	2 August 1988	6 May 1989	First League	27	13	6	8	48.15
Dinamo Zagreb	2 August 1988	6 May 1989	Yugoslav Cup	5	2	2	1	40.00
Dinamo Zagreb	2 August 1988	6 May 1989	UEFA Cup	4	1	1	2	25.00
Dinamo Zagreb Total				36	16	9	11	44.44
Real Valladolid	2 September 1989	28 October 1989	La Liga	9	3	1	5	33.33
Real Valladolid	2 September 1989	28 October 1989	European Cup Winners' Cup	6	3	3	0	50.00
Real Valladolid Total				15	6	4	5	40.00
F.C. Famalicão	18 August 1991	8 March 1992	Primeira Divisão	25	6	7	12	24.00
F.C. Famalicão	18 August 1991	8 March 1992	Taça de Portugal	3	2	0	1	66.67
F.C. Famalicão Total				28	8	7	13	28.57
NK Zagreb	27 February 1994	12 June 1994	Prva HNL	17	9	3	5	52.94
NK Zagreb Total				17	9	3	5	52.94
Nîmes	August 1994	October 1994	French Division 2	12	3	5	4	25.00
Nîmes Total				12	3	5	4	25.00
HNK Rijeka	12 April 1995	4 June 1995	Prva HNL	9	1	4	4	11.11
HNK Rijeka	25 October 1995	17 February 1996	Prva HNL	8	0	3	5	0.00
HNK Rijeka	25 October 1995	17 February 1996	Croatian Cup	1	1	0	0	100.00
HNK Rijeka Total				18	2	7	9	11.11
NK Zadarkomerc	22 November 1998	13 December 1998	Prva HNL	4	1	1	2	25.00
NK Zadarkomerc Total				4	1	1	2	25.00
Lebanon	12 October 2000	18 October 2000	2000 AFC Asian Cup	3	0	1	2	0.00
Lebanon Total				3	0	1	2	0.00
Marseille	25 August 2001	25 August 2001	Ligue 1	1	0	1	0	0.00
Marseille Total				1	0	0	1	0.00
Totals				394	154	107	133	39.09

*Dates of first and last games under Skoblar; not dates of official appointments

== Honours ==
=== Player ===
OFK Beograd

- Yugoslav Cup: 1961–62, 1965–66

Marseille

- Division 1: 1970–71, 1971–72
- Coupe de France: 1971–72
- Challenge des Champions: 1971

Individual

- European Golden Shoe: 1970–71
- French championship top goalscorer: 1970–71, 1971–72, 1972–73
- French Division 1 Foreign Player of the Year: 1970, 1971
- Coupe de France top scorer: 1972
- Ligue 1 Record holder for most goals in single season (44)
- The Dream Team 110 years of OM: 2010
- "Romantičari" (The romantics): Golden era of OFK Beograd
- Olympique de Marseille Hall of Fame
- NK Rijeka all time XI
- Most goals scored in a single French First Division season: 44
- Marseille 3rd all time goalscorer

=== Manager ===
Hajduk Split

- Yugoslav Cup: 1986–87, 1990–91

=== Orders ===
- Knight of the National Order of Merit: 2015
