= Victor Mosa =

Italian-French footballer (1945–2009)

Personal information
- Full name: Vittorio Mosa
- Date of birth: 31 March 1945
- Place of birth: Ravanusa, Italy
- Date of death: 9 January 2009 (aged 63)
- Place of death: Tiuccia, Corsica, France
- Height: 1.73 m (5 ft 8 in)
- Position: Right-back

Youth career
- –1963: US Marignane

Senior career*
Years	Team	Apps	(Gls)
1963–1967	Aix-en-Provence		
1967–1970	Stade Rennais	79	(14)
1971–1973	Bastia	78	(1)
1973–1975	Ajaccio		
- * Club domestic league appearances and goals

Vittorio Mosa (31 March 1945 – 9 January 2009) was an Italian-born French footballer who played as a right-back.

== Early life and career ==
Born in Ravanusa, Sicily, Mosa and his family moved to Marignane shortly before his second birthday. He began his youth career with US Marignane, before being signed by Division 2 side Aix-en-Provence in 1963. In 1967, he signed for Stade Rennais, where he scored 16 goals in 83 matches across three and a half seasons, including 14 goals in 79 Division 1 matches.

In January 1971, he signed for Bastia, and helped them reach the 1972 Coupe de France final, where they lost 2–1 to Marseille, and later played in the 1972–73 European Cup Winners' Cup against Atlético Madrid. In 1973, he signed for Division 2 side Ajaccio, where he retired in 1975.

== Personal life and death ==
Following his retirement, Mosa settled in Marignane, although regularly travel to Tiuccia on the island of Corsica. He died in Tiuccia on 9 January 2009, after suffering a pulmonary embolism at the age of 63.

=== Legacy ===
Following his death, a football tennis tournament in France was named after him.
