= Erich Maas =

German footballer

Personal information
- Date of birth: 24 December 1940 (age 85)
- Place of birth: Prüm, Germany
- Height: 1.68 m (5 ft 6 in)
- Position: Striker

Youth career
- –1962: SV Prüm

Senior career*
Years	Team	Apps	(Gls)
1962–1964	1. FC Saarbrücken	44	(10)
1964–1970	Eintracht Braunschweig	181	(42)
1970	Bayern Munich	6	(0)
1970–1975	Nantes	150	(43)
1975–1976	Rouen	49	(9)
1976–1977	Paris FC	22	(10)
1977	CS Stiring-Wendel		

International career
1968–1970	West Germany	3	(0)
- * Club domestic league appearances and goals

Erich Maas (born 24 December 1940) is a German former footballer who played as a striker. He spent eight seasons in the Bundesliga, as well as five seasons in the French Division 1, and was capped three times for the West Germany national team.

== Honours ==
Eintracht Braunschweig

- Bundesliga: 1966–67

Nantes

- French Division 1: 1972–73
- Coupe de France runner-up: 1972–73
