= 1970–71 French Division 1 =

33rd season of French Division 1

Division Nationale
- Season: 1970–71
- Champions: Marseille (3rd title)
- Relegated: Strasbourg; Valenciennes; Sedan
- European Cup: Marseille
- Cup Winners' Cup: Rennes
- UEFA Cup: Saint-Étienne; Nantes; Nîmes
- Matches: 380
- Goals: 1,108 (2.92 per match)
- Average goals/game: 2.92
- Top goalscorer: Josip Skoblar (44)

Olympique de Marseille won Division 1 season 1970/1971 of the French Association Football League with 55 points.

== Participating teams ==
- AC Ajaccio
- Angers SCO
- AS Angoulême
- SEC Bastia
- Bordeaux
- Olympique Lyonnais
- Olympique de Marseille
- FC Metz
- AS Nancy
- FC Nantes
- OGC Nice
- Nîmes Olympique
- Red Star Paris
- Stade de Reims
- Stade Rennais UC
- AS Saint-Etienne
- CS Sedan
- FC Sochaux-Montbéliard
- RC Strasbourg
- US Valenciennes-Anzin
Location of teams in 1970–71 Division 1

== League table ==
Pos	Team	Pld	W	D	L	GF	GA	GD	Pts	Qualification or relegation
1	Marseille (C)	38	23	9	6	94	48	+46	55	Qualification to European Cup first round
2	Saint-Étienne	38	20	11	7	83	45	+38	51	Qualification to UEFA Cup first round
3	Nantes	38	17	12	9	61	41	+20	46	Qualification to UEFA Cup first round
4	Nîmes	38	17	11	10	68	54	+14	45	Qualification to UEFA Cup first round
5	Bordeaux	38	16	8	14	58	51	+7	40	
6	Ajaccio	38	16	8	14	54	52	+2	40	
7	Lyon	38	14	12	12	51	51	0	40	
8	Metz	38	13	14	11	46	56	−10	40	
9	Reims	38	14	11	13	54	44	+10	39	
10	Sochaux	38	14	10	14	58	55	+3	38	
11	Rennes	38	14	9	15	56	53	+3	37	Qualification to Cup Winners' Cup first round (Note: Rennes qualified for 1971–72 European Cup Winners' Cup as winners of the 1970–71 Coupe de France.)
12	Angers	38	15	5	18	61	66	−5	35	
13	Nancy	38	12	11	15	45	56	−11	35	
14	Nice	38	12	10	16	48	55	−7	34	
15	Red Star	38	11	11	16	46	65	−19	33	
16	Angoulême	38	10	12	16	30	47	−17	32	
17	Bastia	38	12	8	18	52	83	−31	32	
18	Strasbourg (R)	38	13	5	20	54	63	−9	31	Relegation to French Division 2
19	Valenciennes (R)	38	10	9	19	47	59	−12	29	Relegation to French Division 2
20	Sedan (R)	38	10	8	20	42	64	−22	28	Relegation to French Division 2

Rules for classification: 1) points; 2) goal difference; 3) number of goals scored.
Victory: 2 points, Draw: 1 point, Defeat: 0 points
(C) Champions; (R) Relegated
Notes:

Promoted from Division 2, who will play in Division 1 season 1971/1972

- Lille OSC
- AS Monaco
- Paris Saint-Germain Football Club

== Results ==
Home \ Away	ACA	ANG	ASA	BAS	BOR	OL	OM	MET	NAL	NAN	NIC	NMS	RSFC	REI	REN	STE	SED	SOC	RCS	VAL
Ajaccio		0–0	0–0	6–1	2–0	0–0	1–2	2–0	5–0	2–1	3–1	2–2	0–1	1–0	3–0	1–1	1–0	1–0	4–0	1–0
Angers	1–1		1–4	3–0	0–3	3–2	2–1	5–0	2–1	0–1	6–0	1–2	3–1	0–3	2–1	2–2	3–1	1–0	1–3	5–3
Angoulême	2–0	1–1		2–2	1–1	2–2	0–0	1–0	1–0	1–0	1–1	0–2	1–0	1–3	1–0	1–1	1–0	1–0	0–1	1–0
Bastia	1–4	2–0	3–1		2–0	2–1	0–3	2–0	0–2	1–0	3–1	2–2	2–1	0–6	2–2	4–2	4–0	2–2	3–1	1–0
Bordeaux	2–2	3–0	1–0	2–0		3–0	3–1	1–1	2–3	2–3	3–1	3–0	4–1	3–1	0–1	1–2	1–2	1–2	1–4	1–0
Lyon	3–0	1–0	3–0	1–1	2–2		1–4	1–2	2–1	2–0	2–1	0–1	2–1	0–0	3–2	1–2	0–0	2–0	2–2	3–1
Marseille	1–0	5–1	5–0	5–2	3–0	2–2		2–1	3–0	2–2	4–0	2–2	1–1	1–0	5–0	2–2	5–0	2–2	6–3	5–2
Metz	1–3	2–1	1–0	1–0	1–0	6–1	2–1		1–1	0–0	0–0	4–2	2–2	2–0	2–1	2–2	1–0	3–3	2–1	2–2
Nancy	3–1	0–1	2–1	3–0	0–0	0–0	2–0	1–1		1–2	0–0	2–0	0–0	2–2	5–0	1–1	1–0	2–1	3–2	0–2
Nantes	3–0	1–0	0–0	3–1	2–2	1–1	1–3	0–0	7–0		3–1	5–1	1–1	3–0	1–0	2–1	2–0	1–1	1–2	2–0
Nice	2–3	2–1	3–1	2–0	0–1	2–0	1–2	0–1	0–0	3–1		3–0	1–1	2–0	0–1	0–0	2–0	4–5	1–0	4–2
Nîmes	4–0	0–1	3–1	2–0	1–1	1–1	3–0	4–0	1–0	2–2	1–1		1–2	1–1	3–2	5–3	4–0	4–3	3–0	4–1
Red Star	3–0	0–5	0–0	1–1	3–1	1–3	3–4	0–0	3–1	0–3	0–0	1–2		2–1	1–5	1–1	4–2	0–0	2–1	3–2
Reims	1–0	3–1	2–0	5–2	3–0	1–0	1–2	1–1	2–1	0–0	1–1	1–1	0–1		1–1	2–2	2–1	4–1	1–0	2–0
Rennes	0–1	1–0	0–0	3–2	3–0	2–3	2–2	0–0	5–1	4–0	1–3	2–0	3–0	0–0		0–3	0–0	4–0	2–0	1–1
Saint-Étienne	5–2	3–1	1–0	6–0	2–3	1–0	2–1	6–0	4–1	2–3	2–1	0–0	2–1	3–1	1–0		8–0	1–0	2–1	4–0
Sedan	3–1	6–2	1–1	5–1	0–2	3–1	1–2	1–0	2–2	0–0	0–1	1–1	5–0	1–1	0–1	3–1		2–1	1–0	0–1
Sochaux	5–1	0–0	3–0	1–1	1–3	0–0	1–1	5–1	1–0	2–0	1–0	3–0	2–1	2–1	4–2	1–1	3–1		1–0	0–1
Strasbourg	3–0	6–2	2–1	2–2	0–1	0–1	1–2	2–1	0–2	2–2	2–2	0–2	2–1	2–0	3–4	1–0	3–0	2–1		0–0
Valenciennes	0–0	1–3	2–1	2–0	1–1	1–2	1–2	2–2	1–1	1–2	3–1	3–1	1–2	3–1	0–0	0–1	0–0	4–0	3–0	

Legend: Blue = home team win; Yellow = draw; Red = away team win.

== Top goalscorers ==
Rank	Player	Club	Goals
1	(Socialist Federal Republic of Yugoslavia) Josip Skoblar	Marseille	44
2	(Mali) Salif Keïta	Saint-Étienne	42
3	(France) Jacques Vergnes	Nîmes	27
4	(Cameroon) Joseph Yegba Maya	Valenciennes	22
5	(France) Fleury Di Nallo	Lyon	21
5	(France) Philippe Piat	Sochaux	21
7	(Socialist Federal Republic of Yugoslavia) Vladica Kovačević	Angers	20
8	(France) Marc Molitor	Strasbourg	17
9	(France) Réginald Dortomb	Ajaccio	16
9	(France) Serge Lenoir	Rennes	16

== Attendances ==
#	Club	Average attendance
1	Marseille	26,559
2	Saint-Étienne	12,985
3	Nantes	12,251
4	Reims	11,108
5	Stade rennais	11,087
6	Strasbourg	10,907
7	Metz	9,854
8	Nancy	8,780
9	Nîmes	8,282
10	Red Star	7,450
11	Sochaux	7,341
12	Olympique lyonnais	7,947
13	Girondins	7,433
14	Nice	6,214
15	Valenciennes	5,543
16	Sedan	5,030
17	Angers	4,887
18	Angoulême	4,059
19	Bastia	3,636
20	Ajaccio	3,487
