= Michel Le Milinaire =

French footballer and coach (1931–2023)

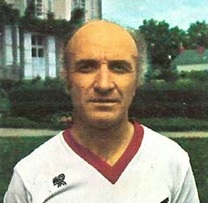
- Le Milinaire in 1977

Personal information
- Date of birth: 7 June 1931
- Place of birth: Kergrist-Moëlou, France
- Date of death: 1 December 2023 (aged 92)
- Position: Midfielder

Senior career*
Years	Team	Apps	(Gls)
1949-1950	CS Rostrenois		
1950-1952	Stade Briochin		
1953-1959	Laval		
1959-1964	CA Mayennais		
1964-1966	Laval II		

Managerial career
- 1960–1964: CA Mayennais
- 1964–1968: Laval II
- 1968–1992: Laval
- 1993–1996: Rennes
- * Club domestic league appearances and goals

Michel Le Milinaire (7 June 1931 – 1 December 2023) was a French football player and coach.

== Career ==
A midfielder, he played for Laval and CA Mayennais. After his playing career, he became a coach with Laval and Rennes.

== Personal life ==
Michel Le Milinaire was born in Kergrist-Moëlou, France on 7 June 1931, and died on 2 December 2023, at the age of 92.

Le Milinaire was the grandfather of the footballer Martin Mimoun.

== Managerial statistics ==
Managerial record by team and tenure
Team	From	To	Record				
Team	From	To	M	W	D	L	Win %
Laval	23 July 1968	30 October 1992	961	369	274	318	38.4
Rennes	5 July 1993	21 June 1996	128	49	42	37	38.3
Total			1,089	418	316	355	38.4

== See also ==
- List of longest managerial reigns in association football
- List of football managers with the most matches
