= 1972–73 Coupe de France =

Tournament details
- Country: France

The 1972–73 Coupe de France was its 56th edition. It was won by Olympique Lyonnais which defeated FC Nantes in the Final.

== Round of 16 ==
Team 1	Agg.	Team 2	1st leg	2nd leg
FC Sochaux-Montbéliard (D1)	4–4 (4–5 p)	Red Star (D1)	3–1	1–3
Olympique Lyonnais (D1)	4–3	Girondins de Bordeaux (D1)	3–0	1–3
Nîmes Olympique (D1)	4–1	Stade de Reims (D1)	2–1	2–0
Paris FC (D1)	3–4	FC Nantes (D1)	2–4	1–0
Olympique de Marseille (D1)	2–1	Lille OSC (D2)	0–1	2–0
AS Saint-Étienne (D1)	7–0	AC Arles (D2)	3–0	4–0
EDS Montluçon (D2)	1–6	Olympique Avignonnais (D2)	0–4	1–2
En Avant Guingamp (PH)	0–8	FC Rouen (D2)	0–5	0–3

== Quarter-finals ==
Team 1	Agg.	Team 2	1st leg	2nd leg
Olympique de Marseille (D1)	1–4	Olympique Lyonnais (D1)	1–0	0–4
AS Saint-Étienne (D1)	3–5	FC Nantes (D1)	2–0	1–5
Nîmes Olympique (D1)	5–4	Red Star (D1)	4–2	1–2
FC Rouen (D2)	2–6	Olympique Avignonnais (D2)	2–0	0–6

== Semi-finals ==
First round

6 June 1973

Olympique Avignonnais (2)	1–0	Olympique Lyonnais (1)
Edom 26'	(Report)

6 June 1973

Nîmes Olympique (1)	0–0	FC Nantes (1)
	(Report)

Second round

8 June 1973

Olympique Lyonnais (1)	4–1	Olympique Avignonnais (2)
Lhomme 10'; Baeza 49'; Trivić 73' (pen.); Lacombe 80'	(Report)	Copé 21'

8 June 1973

FC Nantes (1)	3–0	Nîmes Olympique (1)
Couécou 40' (pen.); Michel 55'; Maas 67'	(Report)

== Final ==
17 June 1973

Lyon	2–1	Nantes
Trivić 29'; Lacombe 63'		Couécou 86'

Parc des Princes, Paris
Attendance: 45,734
Referee: Robert Wurtz
