= Langoiran =

- Commune
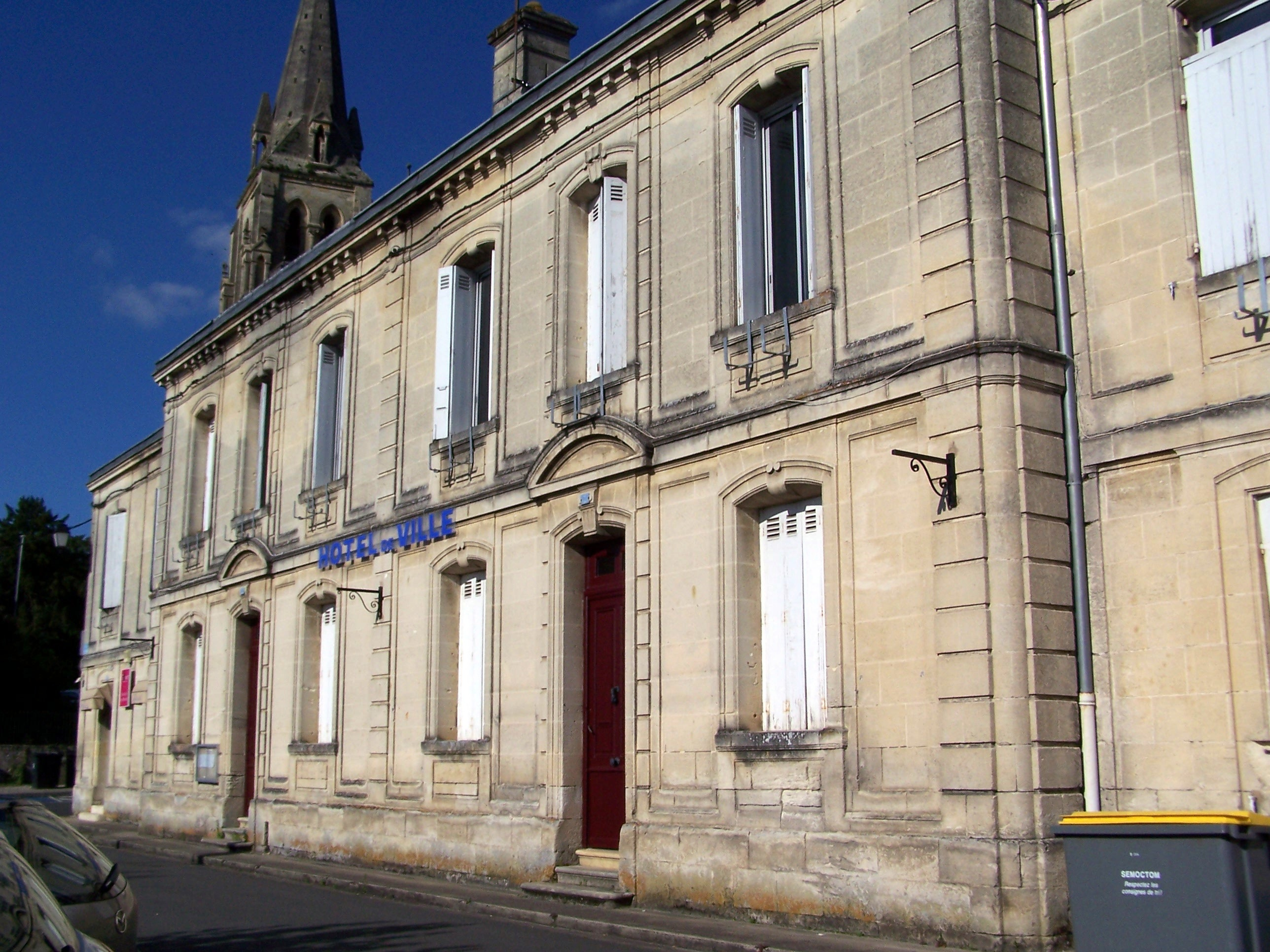
- Town hall

- Coat of arms
- Location of Langoiran
- Location within France Location within Nouvelle-Aquitaine
- Coordinates: 44°42′30″N 0°24′00″W
- Country: France
- Region: Nouvelle-Aquitaine
- Department: Gironde
- Arrondissement: Langon
- Canton: L'Entre-Deux-Mers

Government
  - Mayor (2020–2026): Jean-François Boras
- Area^{1}: 10.14 km^{2} (3.92 sq mi)
- Elevation: 64 m (210 ft)
- Highest elevation: 101 m (331 ft)
- Lowest elevation: 2 m (6.6 ft)
- Population (2023): 2,215
  - Density: 218.4/km^{2} (565.8/sq mi)
- Time zone: UTC+01:00 (CET)
  - Summer (DST): UTC+02:00 (CEST)
- INSEE/Postal code: 33226 /33550
- ^{1} French Land Register data, which excludes lakes, ponds, glaciers > 1 km^{2} (0.386 sq mi or 247 acres) and river estuaries.

Langoiran (French pronunciation: [lɑ̃ɡwaʁɑ̃]) is a commune in the Gironde department in Nouvelle-Aquitaine in southwestern France.

== Population ==
Historical population
Year	Pop.	±% p.a.
1968	1,695	—
1975	1,660	−0.30%
1982	2,007	+2.75%
1990	2,024	+0.11%
1999	1,997	−0.15%
2007	2,094	+0.59%
2012	2,299	+1.89%
2017	2,152	−1.31%
2023	2,215	+0.48%
Source: INSEE

== Personalities ==
It is the birthplace of French footballer Alain Giresse who played in the 1986 World Cup.

== See also ==
- Communes of the Gironde department
