= Privlaka, Zadar County =

Municipality of Croatia

Privlaka
- Interactive map of Privlaka
- Location within Croatia
- Coordinates: 44.259°N 15.129°E
- Country: Croatia
- Region: Dalmatia
- County: Zadar County

Area
  - Total: 11.1 km^{2} (4.3 sq mi)

Population (2021)
  - Total: 2,128
  - Density: 192/km^{2} (497/sq mi)
- Time zone: UTC+1 (CET)
  - Summer (DST): UTC+2 (CEST)
- Website: privlaka.hr

Privlaka is a municipality and its only settlement, in Zadar County in Croatia. According to the 2011 census, it had 2,253 inhabitants, 98% of whom were Croats.

== Demographics ==
Privlaka: Population trends 1857–2021
v

population	548	669	725	831	941	1109	1400	1530	2179	2318	2364	2594	2281	2988	2199	2253	2128
	1857	1869	1880	1890	1900	1910	1921	1931	1948	1953	1961	1971	1981	1991	2001	2011	2021

Sources: Croatian Bureau of Statistics publications
