= 1971–72 Coupe de France =

Tournament details
- Country: France

The 1971–72 Coupe de France was its 55th edition. It was won by Olympique de Marseille which defeated SC Bastia in the Final.

== Round of 16 ==
Team 1	Agg.	Team 2	1st leg	2nd leg
FC Sochaux-Montbéliard (D1)	1–3	Stade de Reims (D1)	1–0	0–3
FC Nantes (D1)	0–1	OGC Nice (D1)	0–1	0–0
AC Ajaccio (D1)	0–2	SC Bastia (D1)	0–2	0–0
Olympique de Marseille (D1)	4–3	EDS Montluçon (D2)	4–1	0–2
SC Toulon (D2)	1–3	Red Star (D1)	1–3	0–0
AS Nancy (D1)	10–1	AS Poissy (D3)	2–0	8–1
RC Lens (D2)	2–1	FC Mantes (D2)	1–0	1–1
Olympique Avignonnais (D2)	5–2	FC Rouen (D2)	4–0	1–2

== Quarter-finals ==
Team 1	Agg.	Team 2	1st leg	2nd leg
OGC Nice (D1)	1–2	Olympique de Marseille (D1)	1–1	0–1
Stade de Reims (D1)	2–0	AS Nancy (D1)	2–0	0–0
RC Lens (D2)	1–0	Red Star (D1)	1–0	0–0
Olympique Avignonnais (D2)	0–2	SC Bastia (D1)	0–1	0–1

== Semi-finals ==
First round

10 May 1972

Stade de Reims (1)	0–0	Olympique de Marseille (1)
	(Report)

10 May 1972

SC Bastia (1)	3–0	RC Lens (2)
Dogliani 5'; Félix 14'; Giordani 67'	(Report)

Second round

13 May 1972

Olympique de Marseille (1)	2–2 (a.e.t.)	Stade de Reims (1)
Couécou 27' (pen.), 39'	(Report)	Richard 63'; Brucato 82'
Penalties
Couécou (penalty scored); Magnusson (penalty scored); Bosquier (penalty scored)	3–1	(penalty scored) Delio Onnis; (penalty missed) Richard; (penalty missed) Teisseire; (penalty missed) Zywica

14 May 1972

RC Lens (2)	2–0	SC Bastia (1)
Faber 33'; Zuraszek 40'	(Report)

== Final ==
4 June 1972

Marseille	2–1	Bastia
Couécou 15'; Skoblar 73'		Franceschetti 85'

Parc des Princes, Paris
Attendance: 44,069
Referee: Robert Frauciel
