= 1971–72 French Division 1 =

34th season of French Division 1

Division Nationale
- Season: 1971–72
- Champions: Marseille (4th title)
- Relegated: Lille; Monaco; Angoulême
- European Cup: Marseille
- Cup Winners' Cup: Bastia
- UEFA Cup: Nîmes; Sochaux; Angers
- Matches: 380
- Goals: 1,087 (2.86 per match)
- Top goalscorer: Josip Skoblar (30)

Olympique de Marseille won Division 1 season 1971/1972 of the French Association Football League with 56 points.

== Teams ==
- AC Ajaccio
- Angers SCO
- AS Angoulême
- SEC Bastia
- Bordeaux
- Lille OSC
- Olympique Lyonnais
- Olympique de Marseille
- FC Metz
- AS Monaco
- AS Nancy
- FC Nantes
- OGC Nice
- Nîmes Olympique
- Paris Saint-Germain Football Club
- Red Star Paris
- Stade de Reims
- Stade Rennais FC
- AS Saint-Etienne
- FC Sochaux-Montbéliard
Location of teams in 1971–72 Division 1

== League table ==
Pos	Team	Pld	W	D	L	GF	GA	GD	Pts	Qualification or relegation
1	Marseille (C)	38	24	8	6	78	37	+41	56	Qualification to European Cup first round
2	Nîmes	38	21	9	8	76	37	+39	51	Qualification to UEFA Cup first round
3	Sochaux	38	21	5	12	57	42	+15	47	Qualification to UEFA Cup first round
4	Angers	38	19	7	12	56	40	+16	45	Qualification to UEFA Cup first round
5	Lyon	38	18	9	11	58	45	+13	45	
6	Saint-Étienne	38	20	4	14	81	59	+22	44	
7	Nantes	38	17	9	12	70	48	+22	43	
8	Nice	38	15	12	11	58	44	+14	42	
9	Bastia	38	20	2	16	58	57	+1	42	Qualification to Cup Winners' Cup first round (Note: Bastia qualified for 1972–73 European Cup Winners' Cup as runners-up of the 1971–72 Coupe de France as cup winners Marseille also won the league and qualified for the European Cup.)
10	Nancy	38	14	12	12	56	49	+7	40	
11	Rennes	38	13	12	13	53	54	−1	38	
12	Bordeaux	38	12	11	15	39	52	−13	35	
13	Ajaccio	38	12	9	17	49	53	−4	33	
14	Metz	38	13	7	18	44	49	−5	33	
15	Reims	38	9	13	16	46	69	−23	31	
16	Paris Saint-Germain (R)	38	10	10	18	51	67	−16	30	Administratively relegated to Division 3 [fr] (Note: Paris Saint-Germain were administratively relegated to Division 3 following their split from Paris FC at the end of the season.)
17	Red Star	38	10	10	18	34	64	−30	30	
18	Lille (R)	38	8	10	20	43	68	−25	26	Relegation to French Division 2
19	Monaco (R)	38	8	10	20	41	68	−27	26	Relegation to French Division 2
20	Angoulême (R)	38	8	7	23	39	85	−46	23	Relegation to French Division 2

Source: Histoire du PSG
Rules for classification: 1) points; 2) goal difference; 3) number of goals scored.
Victory: 2 points, Draw: 1 point, Defeat: 0 points
(C) Champions; (R) Relegated
Notes:

Promoted from Division 2, who will play in Division 1 season 1972/1973

- US Valenciennes-Anzin: Champion of Division 2, winner of Division 2 group B
- CS Sedan: Runner-up, winner of Division 2 group A
- RC Strasbourg: Runner-up, winner of Division 2 group C

== Results ==
Home \ Away	ACA	ANG	ASA	BAS	BOR	LIL	OL	OM	MET	ASM	NAL	NAN	NIC	NMS	PSG	RS	REI	REN	STE	SOC
Ajaccio		1–3	3–0	2–0	3–1	0–1	2–0	1–1	1–0	3–0	3–1	4–2	0–0	0–0	3–0	1–0	2–2	1–2	2–1	1–2
Angers	2–1		8–1	2–0	3–1	3–1	2–1	1–0	1–1	4–1	1–1	2–1	2–0	0–0	2–0	1–0	3–2	1–1	1–1	2–0
Angoulême	1–3	1–0		2–1	3–0	3–3	2–0	2–3	1–0	2–0	1–1	2–5	1–1	0–3	3–1	0–2	2–1	0–0	3–4	0–0
Bastia	2–1	3–1	2–0		1–0	1–0	1–1	2–1	1–0	1–2	2–0	2–1	3–3	1–0	1–0	2–0	3–1	4–1	3–0	6–1
Bordeaux	1–0	1–1	2–0	2–1		3–1	0–3	0–2	0–0	3–1	1–0	2–2	2–1	1–4	2–0	2–0	1–1	2–1	0–2	0–1
Lille	3–1	0–1	4–2	1–0	0–0		0–1	0–2	3–0	1–1	1–1	3–0	3–3	1–1	1–3	3–1	0–0	0–0	2–0	2–3
Lyon	2–1	1–2	2–0	3–0	2–2	1–0		3–3	2–1	2–2	3–2	1–3	2–0	3–2	3–1	5–1	5–0	0–2	2–0	1–0
Marseille	1–1	2–1	3–0	0–2	3–0	3–0	1–1		3–0	4–2	1–1	2–0	1–0	3–1	4–2	6–0	0–0	1–1	2–3	3–0
Metz	3–0	0–0	1–0	2–1	1–3	4–0	1–0	1–3		4–0	0–1	3–0	1–0	3–1	2–0	3–0	3–0	1–2	0–4	0–1
Monaco	2–2	3–0	1–0	0–1	1–2	1–1	0–1	0–1	3–2		4–2	2–1	0–2	1–1	2–1	0–0	1–1	0–1	1–2	1–3
Nancy	2–0	1–0	3–2	2–0	2–1	2–1	2–2	1–2	1–1	3–0		1–0	3–2	0–1	2–3	1–1	0–0	3–1	3–1	0–0
Nantes	2–0	1–0	5–0	4–0	0–0	2–1	2–0	1–1	5–1	1–1	2–2		4–0	2–0	6–0	1–1	0–2	4–0	4–3	2–0
Nice	2–0	3–1	3–0	0–1	5–1	3–1	2–1	2–0	1–1	2–0	1–0	1–1		4–0	1–1	1–0	3–0	0–0	1–2	1–2
Nîmes	2–0	1–0	3–0	6–2	1–1	5–2	2–0	1–3	1–1	5–1	0–0	4–0	2–0		4–1	2–0	2–1	3–0	4–0	2–1
Paris SG	1–1	0–1	3–0	4–1	0–0	4–1	1–2	1–2	3–1	0–0	1–4	2–3	1–1	1–1		4–1	2–4	1–1	1–3	1–0
Red Star	3–1	2–1	1–1	2–1	1–0	0–0	1–1	2–4	1–1	1–0	1–1	0–1	1–2	1–5	0–0		2–2	1–0	1–2	2–1
Reims	3–1	2–1	3–1	0–2	2–1	2–0	0–0	1–3	0–1	1–1	3–2	0–0	1–2	1–1	3–3	0–1		0–2	2–1	2–3
Rennes	1–1	3–1	2–2	1–0	2–0	5–2	0–0	1–2	3–0	1–3	3–1	1–1	2–2	0–2	1–1	2–0	4–1		2–4	0–2
Saint-Étienne	1–1	0–1	4–0	5–3	1–1	4–0	0–1	2–1	2–0	3–2	1–3	2–1	2–2	1–3	0–1	5–1	9–1	4–2		0–1
Sochaux	3–1	2–0	4–1	6–1	0–0	2–0	4–0	0–1	1–0	3–1	2–1	2–0	1–1	1–0	0–2	1–2	1–1	3–2	0–2	

Legend: Blue = home team win; Yellow = draw; Red = away team win.

== Top goalscorers ==
Rank	Player	Club	Goals
1	(Socialist Federal Republic of Yugoslavia) Josip Skoblar	Marseille	30
2	(Mali) Salif Keita	Saint-Étienne	29
3	(France) Jacques Vergnes	Nîmes	26
4	(Argentina) Delio Onnis	Reims	22
5	(Argentina) Angel Marcos	Nantes	20
6	(France) Bernard Lacombe	Lyon	19
6	(France) Hervé Revelli	Nice	19
8	(Republic of the Congo) François M'Pelé	Ajaccio	17
8	(France) Fleury Di Nallo	Lyon	17
8	(France) Jacques Bonnet	Nîmes	17
8	(France) Philippe Piat	Sochaux	17

== Attendances ==
#	Club	Average
1	Marseille	22,864
2	Saint-Étienne	13,440
3	Nantes	11,678
4	Olympique lyonnais	11,625
5	Stade rennais	10,652
6	Nice	10,188
7	LOSC	10,059
8	Paris FC	10,030
9	Reims	10,027
10	Nancy	9,888
11	Nîmes	9,887
12	Metz	9,424
13	Red Star	8,273
14	Sochaux	7,280
15	Girondins	7,167
16	Angers	6,020
17	Bastia	4,030
18	Angoulême	3,539
19	Ajaccio	3,076
20	Monaco	2,534
