= Didier Couécou =

French footballer (born 1944)

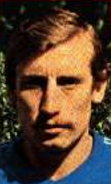
- Couécou with Bordeaux in the 1975–76 season

Personal information
- Full name: Didier Couécou
- Date of birth: 25 July 1944 (age 82)
- Place of birth: Caudéran, France
- Height: 1.75 m (5 ft 9 in)
- Position: Striker

Senior career*
Years	Team	Apps	(Gls)
1963–1969	Bordeaux	133	(59)
1969–1970	Nice	11	(1)
1970–1972	Marseille	63	(22)
1972–1974	Nantes	41	(14)
1974	Marseille	16	(6)
1974–1976	Bordeaux	46	(16)
Total		310	(118)

International career
1967	France	1	(0)

Managerial career
- 1989: Bordeaux
- * Club domestic league appearances and goals

Didier Couécou (born 25 July 1944) is a former French footballer who played striker. He was part of France national football team at the FIFA World Cup 1966.
