= 1972–73 French Division 1 =

35th season of French Division 1

Division 1
- Season: 1972–73
- Champions: Nantes (3rd title)
- Relegated: Valenciennes; Red Star; Ajaccio
- European Cup: Nantes
- Cup Winners' Cup: Lyon
- UEFA Cup: Nice; Marseille
- Matches: 380
- Goals: 1,050 (2.76 per match)
- Top goalscorer: Josip Skoblar (26)

FC Nantes won Division 1 season 1972/1973 of the French Association Football League with 55 points.

== Participating teams ==
- AC Ajaccio
- Angers SCO
- SEC Bastia
- Bordeaux
- Olympique Lyonnais
- Olympique de Marseille
- FC Metz
- AS Nancy
- FC Nantes
- OGC Nice
- Nîmes Olympique
- Paris FC
- Red Star Paris
- Stade de Reims
- Stade Rennais FC
- AS Saint-Etienne
- CS Sedan
- FC Sochaux-Montbéliard
- RC Strasbourg
- US Valenciennes-Anzin
Location of teams in 1972–73 Division 1

== League table ==
Pos	Team	Pld	W	D	L	GF	GA	GD	Pts	Qualification or relegation
1	Nantes (C)	38	23	9	6	67	31	+36	55	Qualification to European Cup first round
2	Nice	38	20	10	8	70	44	+26	50	Qualification to UEFA Cup first round
3	Marseille	38	19	10	9	64	37	+27	48	Qualification to UEFA Cup first round
4	Saint-Étienne	38	18	10	10	64	47	+17	46	
5	Angers	38	16	11	11	52	47	+5	43	
6	Nancy	38	16	10	12	59	47	+12	42	
7	Nîmes	38	16	10	12	48	39	+9	42	
8	Reims	38	15	11	12	50	47	+3	41	
9	Bastia	38	15	8	15	59	41	+18	38	
10	Rennes	38	14	10	14	46	53	−7	38	
11	Sochaux	38	12	13	13	56	54	+2	37	
12	Paris FC	38	13	10	15	54	58	−4	36	
13	Lyon	38	14	7	17	62	67	−5	35	Qualification to Cup Winners' Cup first round (Note: Lyon qualified for 1973–74 European Cup Winners' Cup as winners of the 1972–73 Coupe de France.)
14	Bordeaux	38	12	11	15	49	55	−6	35	
15	Metz	38	13	9	16	44	52	−8	35	
16	Strasbourg	38	9	12	17	42	62	−20	30	
17	Sedan	38	11	8	19	49	71	−22	30	
18	Valenciennes (R)	38	9	10	19	37	51	−14	28	Relegation to French Division 2
19	Red Star (R)	38	7	14	17	38	58	−20	28	Relegation to French Division 2
20	Ajaccio (R)	38	7	9	22	40	89	−49	23	Relegation to French Division 2

Rules for classification: 1) points; 2) goal difference; 3) number of goals scored.
Victory: 2 points, Draw: 1 point, Defeat: 0 points
(C) Champions; (R) Relegated
Notes:

Promoted from Division 2, who will play in Division 1 season 1973/1974

- RC Lens: Champion of Division 2, winner of Division 2 group A
- Troyes AF: Runner-up, winner of Division 2 group B
- AS Monaco: Third place, winner of barrages

== Results ==
Home \ Away	ACA	ANG	BAS	BOR	OL	OM	MET	NAL	NAN	NIC	NMS	PFC	RS	REI	REN	STE	SED	SOC	RCS	VAL
Ajaccio		1–1	0–1	2–2	4–3	1–0	0–0	2–2	1–1	0–3	1–1	2–1	2–2	2–3	2–3	2–0	2–1	2–0	0–2	3–1
Angers	4–0		3–0	3–1	1–0	0–2	3–2	0–0	1–0	0–0	0–1	1–1	1–0	1–1	0–2	2–0	2–2	1–0	1–0	5–1
Bastia	1–0	2–0		1–1	1–1	0–0	4–0	3–1	0–0	3–0	3–0	1–0	3–0	1–1	4–0	3–3	3–0	3–1	3–0	2–0
Bordeaux	3–0	1–2	1–1		1–0	2–1	2–0	3–1	2–1	0–1	0–1	0–1	1–1	2–0	1–1	1–1	6–1	1–1	2–1	2–0
Lyon	1–0	2–1	2–0	0–1		4–4	3–0	2–2	2–4	1–2	1–0	5–2	1–2	1–1	3–1	2–0	1–2	2–0	4–0	1–0
Marseille	3–0	3–2	1–0	1–1	5–2		5–0	0–0	1–0	1–1	1–2	0–0	3–0	3–1	3–0	3–1	0–1	1–1	3–1	1–0
Metz	7–0	2–0	3–2	1–1	2–2	2–0		1–0	0–2	1–0	0–1	0–1	3–0	1–2	2–1	1–2	4–2	2–1	1–1	1–1
Nancy	2–1	0–0	3–2	2–1	4–1	1–0	0–2		1–1	3–0	2–1	1–2	2–1	3–0	4–0	4–0	1–1	4–2	2–1	1–1
Nantes	6–1	2–0	1–0	3–0	3–0	1–2	0–0	2–1		2–2	2–1	2–0	3–1	0–0	1–0	1–0	1–0	4–3	6–2	1–0
Nice	5–3	2–4	1–0	0–1	2–2	1–1	6–0	1–0	3–0		2–0	3–2	1–1	2–2	2–0	1–1	4–2	4–1	3–0	4–1
Nîmes	2–1	2–2	2–1	2–0	3–1	1–1	0–0	2–1	1–1	0–1		2–0	1–1	2–1	1–1	4–0	2–1	3–0	3–0	1–1
Paris FC	3–1	1–2	2–0	4–3	5–1	1–3	1–3	3–2	1–2	2–0	3–1		3–0	0–0	2–2	1–1	2–1	0–2	1–1	1–1
Red Star	3–0	1–2	2–2	3–1	0–1	1–2	1–0	0–1	1–3	1–1	1–1	2–3		1–2	2–0	0–3	1–1	3–3	0–0	1–0
Reims	0–0	3–2	2–0	3–1	2–1	2–1	0–0	2–3	2–1	2–3	0–1	1–1	3–0		1–1	0–0	5–1	1–0	1–0	1–0
Rennes	1–1	1–2	2–1	3–0	3–2	2–3	1–0	4–1	0–0	1–0	1–0	2–1	1–1	1–0		2–2	1–1	0–0	1–0	2–0
Saint-Étienne	3–1	5–0	2–1	6–2	1–1	2–1	1–0	1–0	1–2	0–1	3–1	3–0	1–1	2–1	2–0		2–0	2–2	5–1	3–2
Sedan	5–0	2–2	2–1	1–0	4–1	0–2	1–1	1–0	0–3	0–5	2–1	3–1	0–1	2–0	2–3	1–3		1–1	0–0	3–1
Sochaux	4–0	1–1	3–2	0–0	3–1	1–2	4–1	2–2	0–1	5–1	0–0	1–1	1–0	2–1	2–1	2–1	1–0		1–1	3–0
Strasbourg	6–0	0–0	0–4	2–2	0–2	1–1	0–1	1–1	0–3	0–1	2–1	2–0	2–2	4–1	2–1	0–0	2–1	4–2		1–1
Valenciennes	3–2	3–0	1–0	3–0	1–2	1–0	1–0	0–1	1–1	1–1	1–0	1–1	0–0	1–2	2–0	0–1	5–1	0–0	1–2	

Legend: Blue = home team win; Yellow = draw; Red = away team win.

== Top goalscorers ==
Rank	Player	Club	Goals
1	(Socialist Federal Republic of Yugoslavia) Josip Skoblar	Marseille	26
2	(France) Bernard Lacombe	Lyon	23
3	(France) Hervé Revelli	Nice	22
4	(Netherlands) Dick van Dijk	Nice	20
5	(France) Nestor Combin	Metz	18
6	(Republic of the Congo) François M'Pelé	Ajaccio	17
6	(France) François Félix	Bastia	17
6	(France) Fleury Di Nallo	Lyon	17
6	(Argentina) Delio Onnis	Reims	17
10	(France) Louis Floch	Paris FC	16
10	(France) Antoine Kuszowski	Nancy	16
10	(France) Patrick Revelli	Saint-Étienne	16

== Attendances ==
#	Club	Average
1	Marseille	20,681
2	Nantes	16,467
3	Nice	14,367
4	Paris FC	13,202
5	Saint-Étienne	11,887
6	Strasbourg	11,347
7	Reims	10,697
8	Stade rennais	10,222
9	Nancy	10,188
10	Red Star	8,815
11	Metz	8,108
12	Nîmes	8,072
13	Olympique lyonnais	7,980
14	Girondins	7,241
15	Angers	6,276
16	Valenciennes	5,720
17	Sedan	5,548
18	Sochaux	4,642
19	Bastia	3,578
20	Ajaccio	2,241
