= List of Olympique de Marseille players =

This is a list of notable footballers who have played for Olympique de Marseille. This list contains players that have appeared in 100 matches or more in competitive competitions (Ligue 1, French Cup, League Cup and European competitions) for the club. However, certain players who have appeared in less matches are also included; players who fell short of the total of 100 appearances but made significant contributions to the history of the club or are involved in 1990–91 European Cup, 1992–93 UEFA Champions League, 1998–99 UEFA Cup, 2003–04 UEFA Cup and 2017–18 UEFA Europa League campaigns. For a full list of all Marseille players with Wikipedia articles—major or otherwise—see Category:Olympique de Marseille players.

== Position ==
Playing positions are listed according to the tactical formations that were employed at the time.

Positions key
GK	Goalkeeper
DF	Defender
MF	Midfielder
FW	Forward

Players are listed according to the date of their first professional contract signed with the club. Appearances and goals are for competitive first-team matches only. Substitute appearances included.

== List of players ==
As of 23 October 2025

Players who represented their country while at the club.

Players highlighted in bold are still actively playing at Marseille.

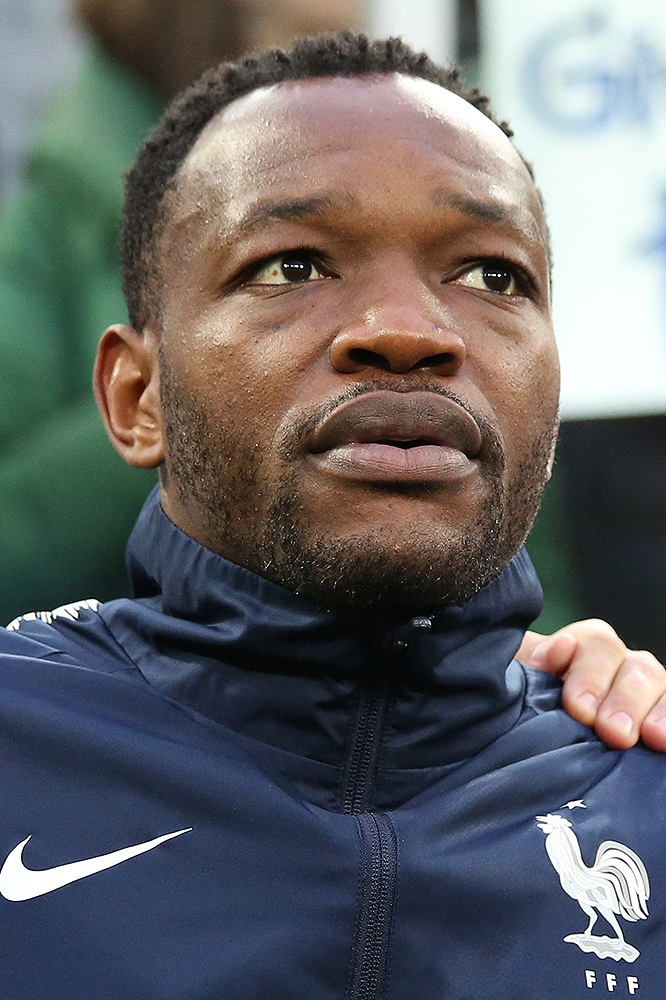
Steve Mandanda

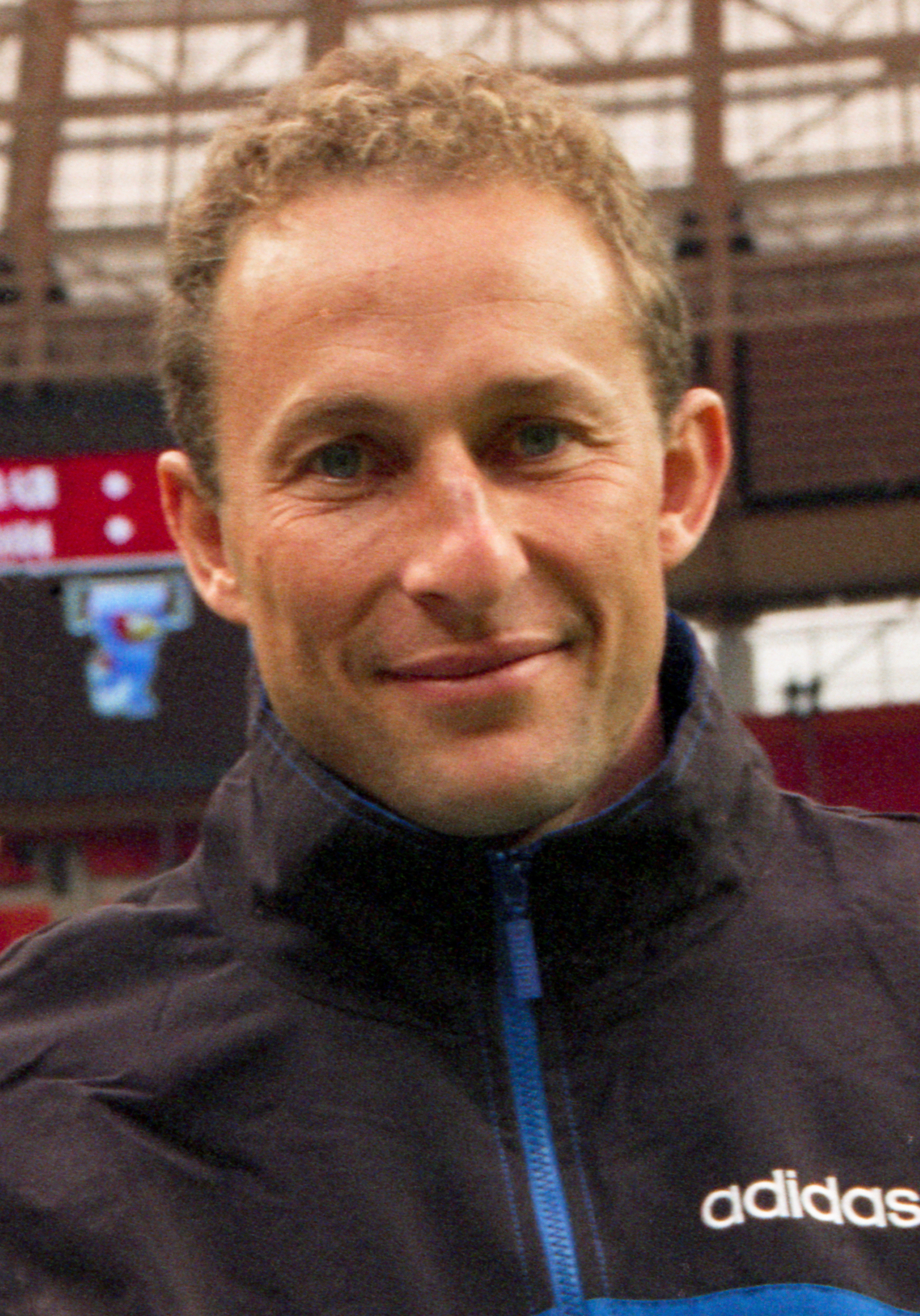
Jean-Pierre Papin

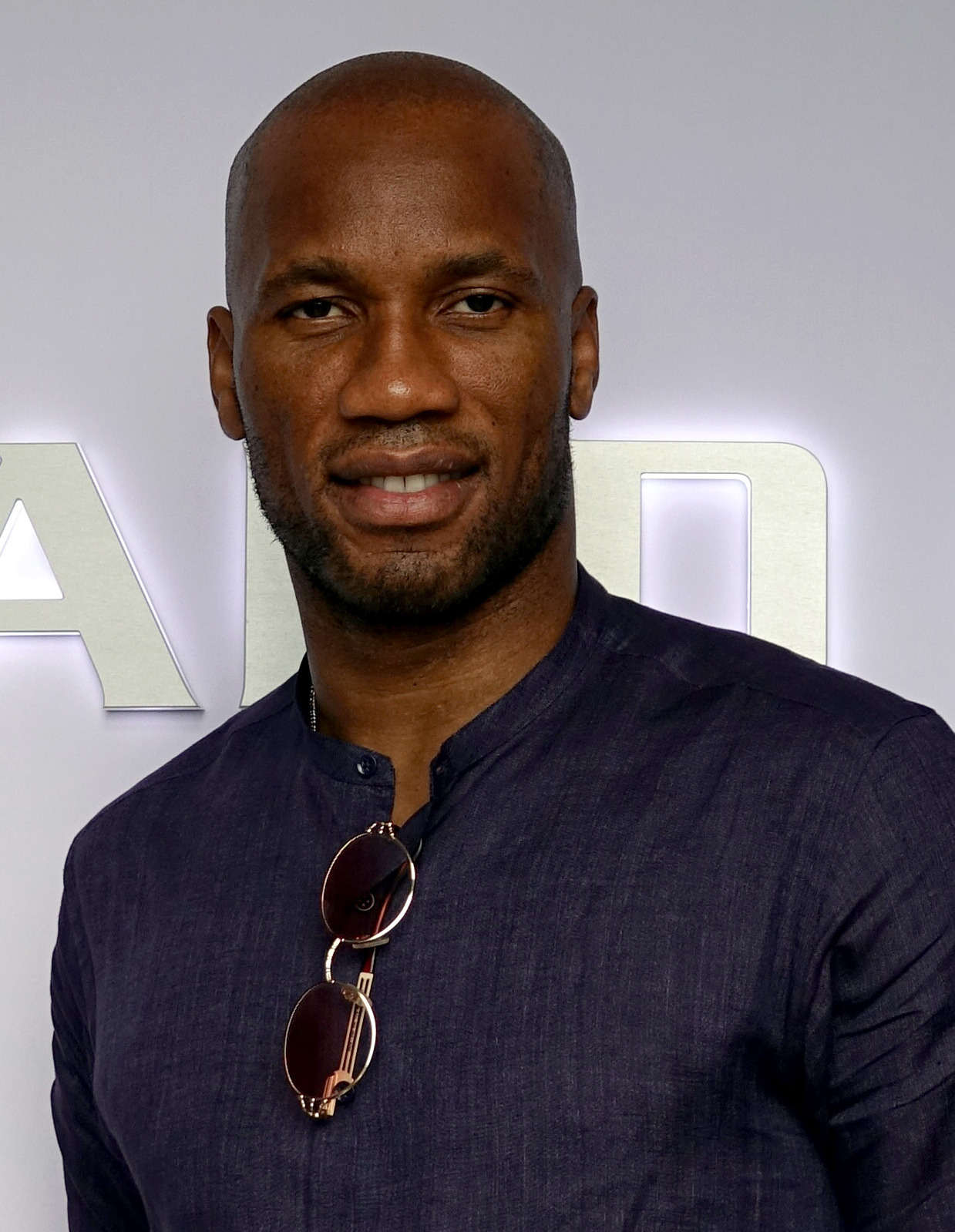
Didier Drogba

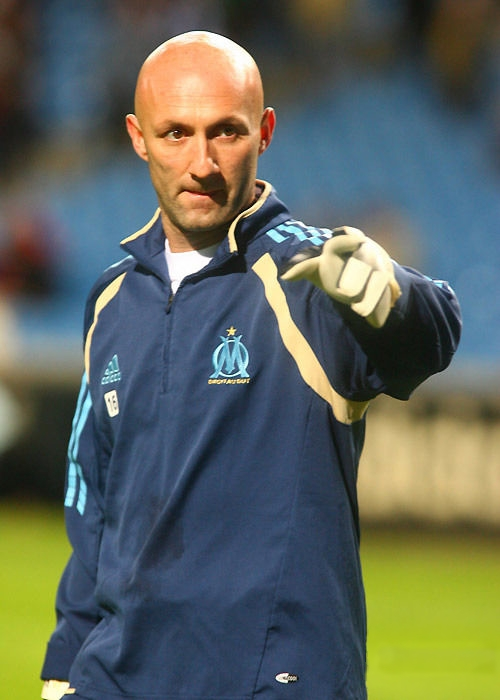
Fabien Barthez

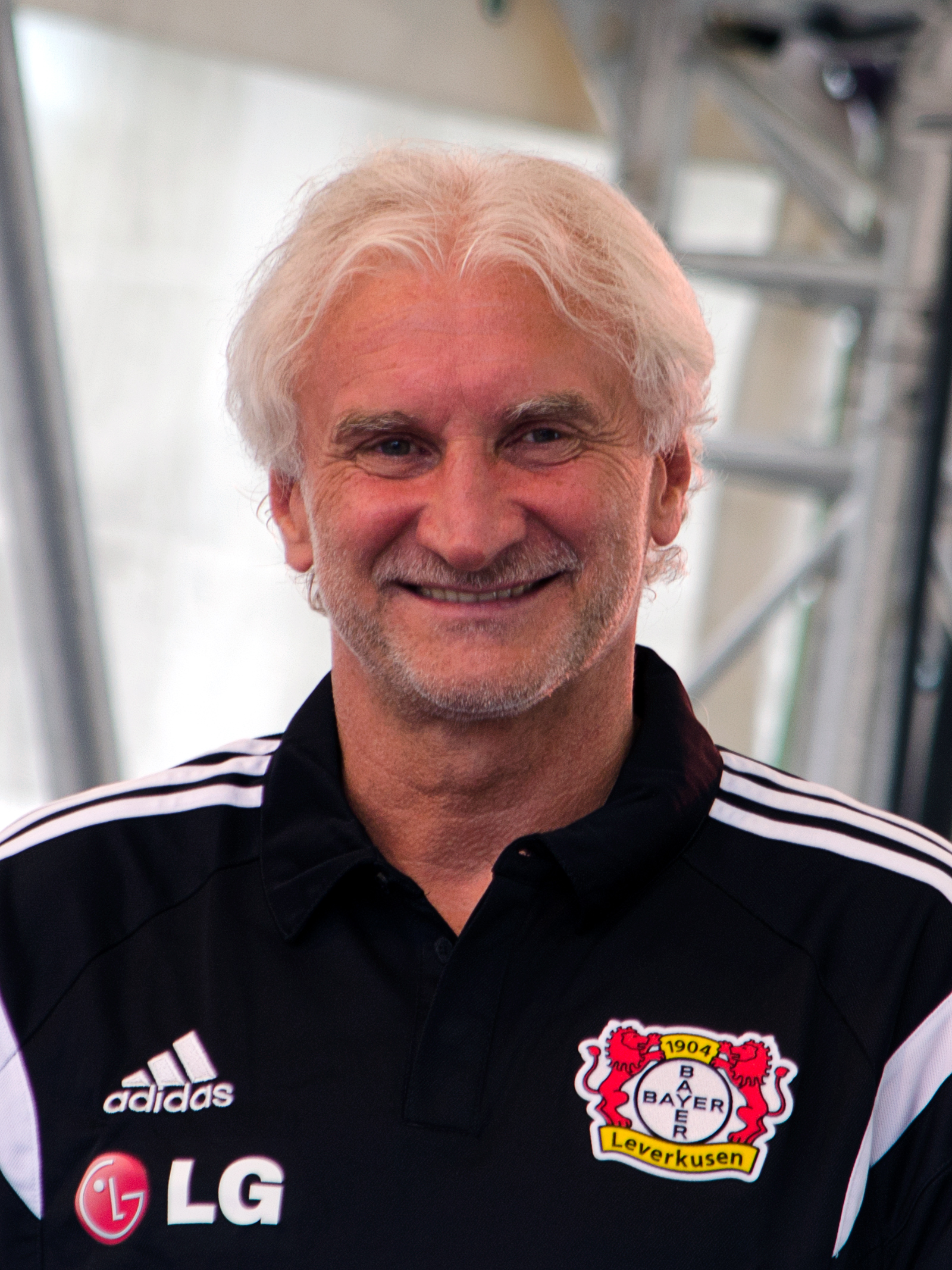
Rudi Völler

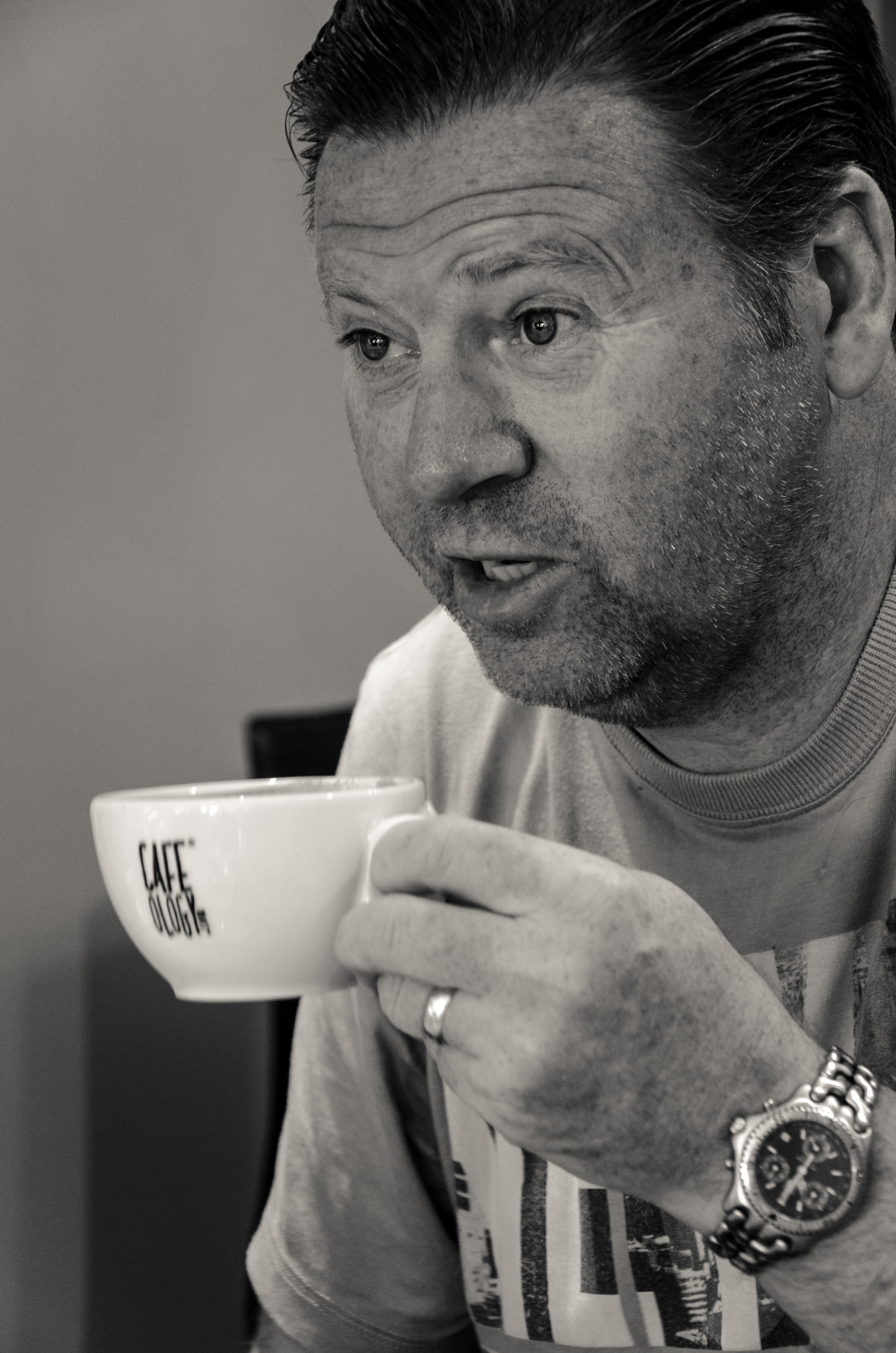
Chris Waddle

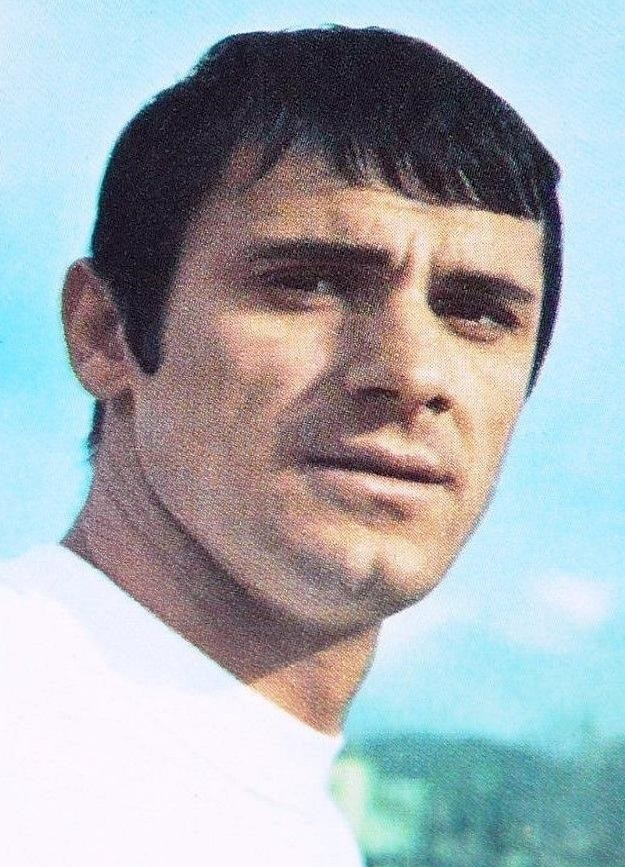
Josip Skoblar

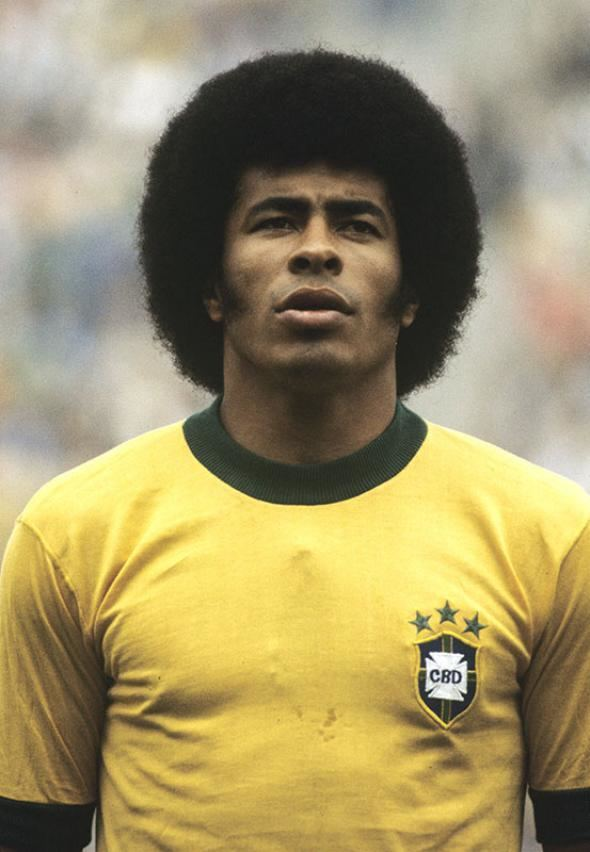
Jairzinho

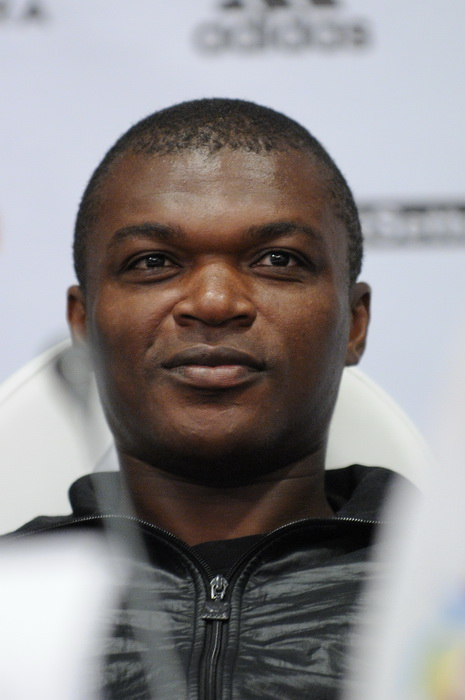
Marcel Desailly

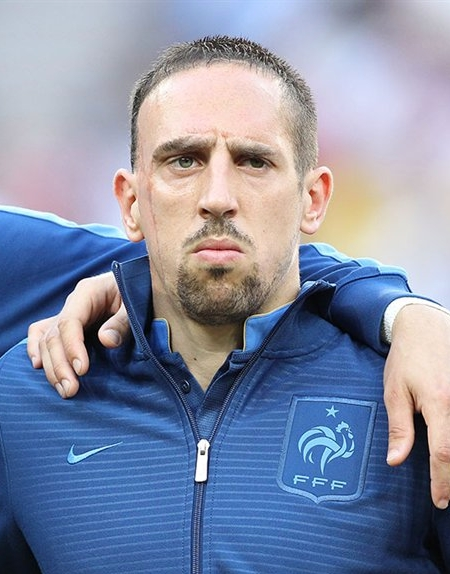
Franck Ribéry

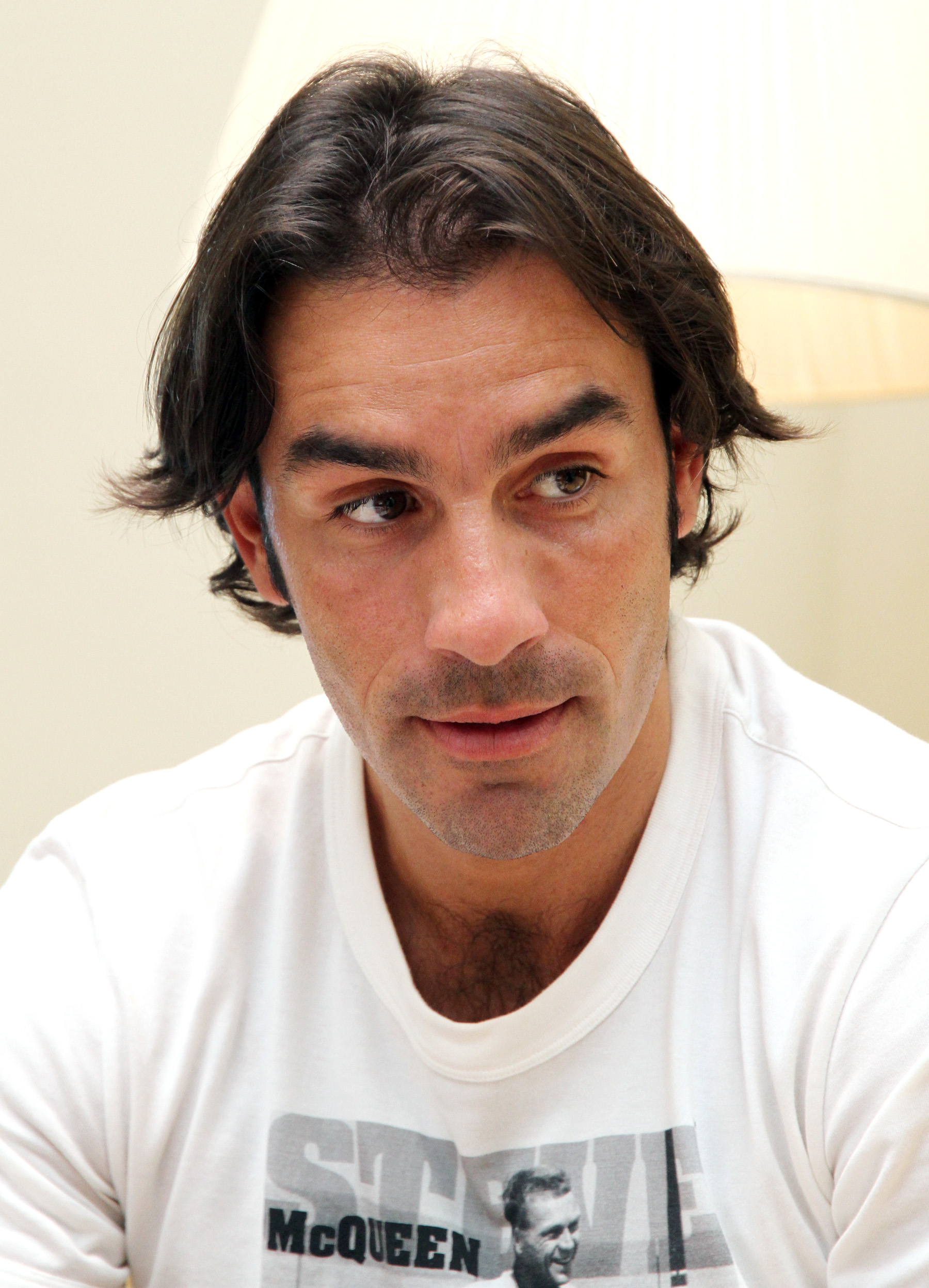
Robert Pires

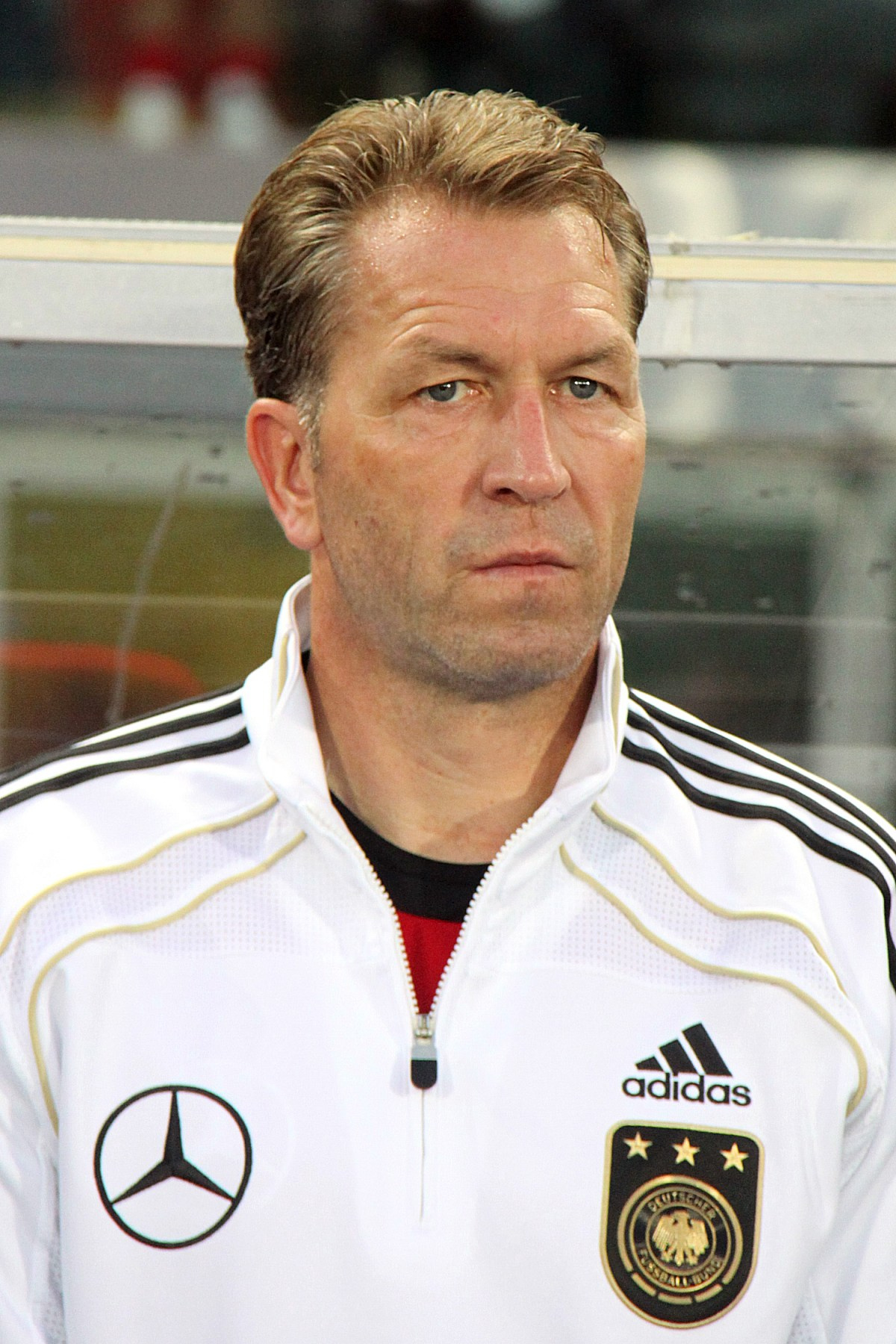
Andreas Köpke

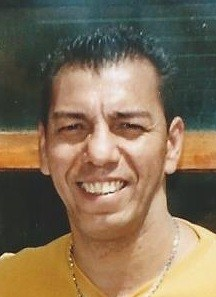
Carlos Mozer

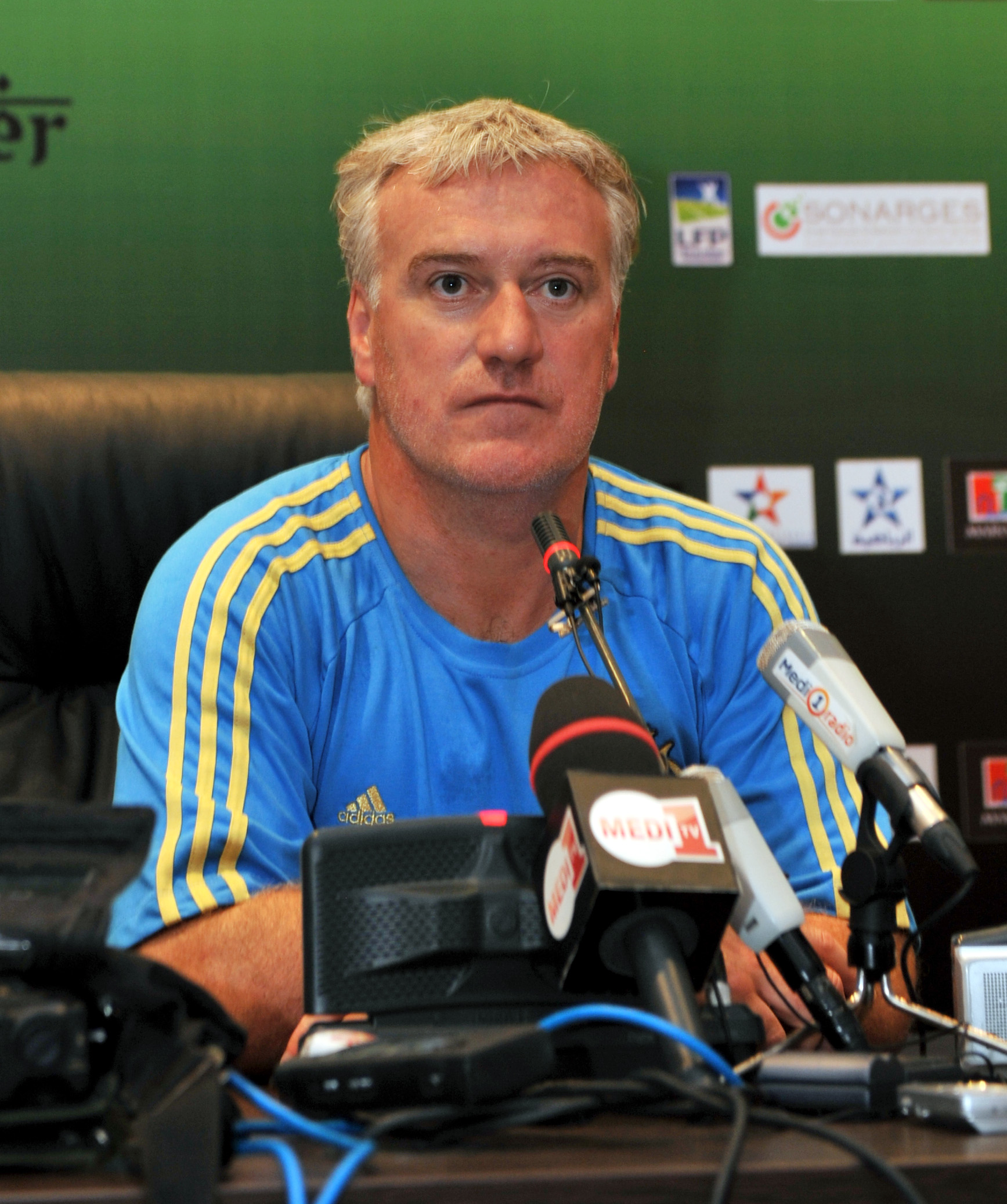
Didier Deschamps

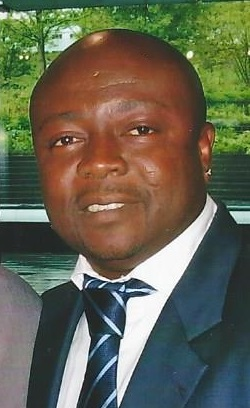
Abedi Pele

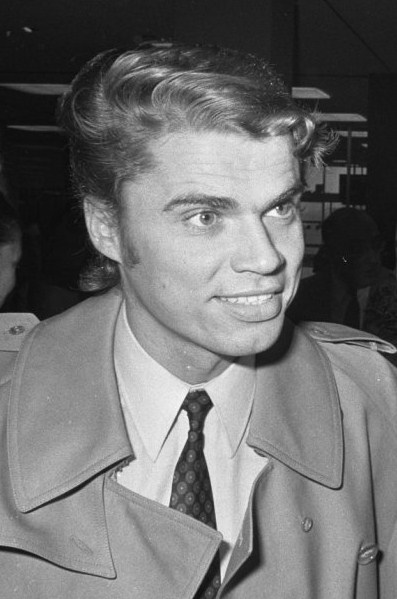
Roger Magnusson

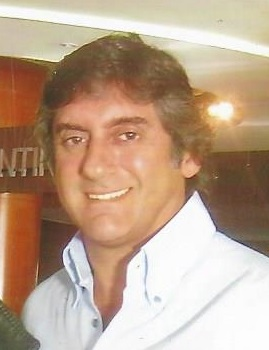
Enzo Francescoli

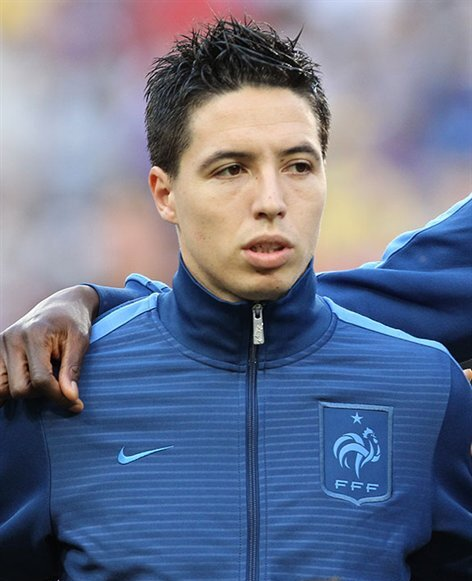
Samir Nasri

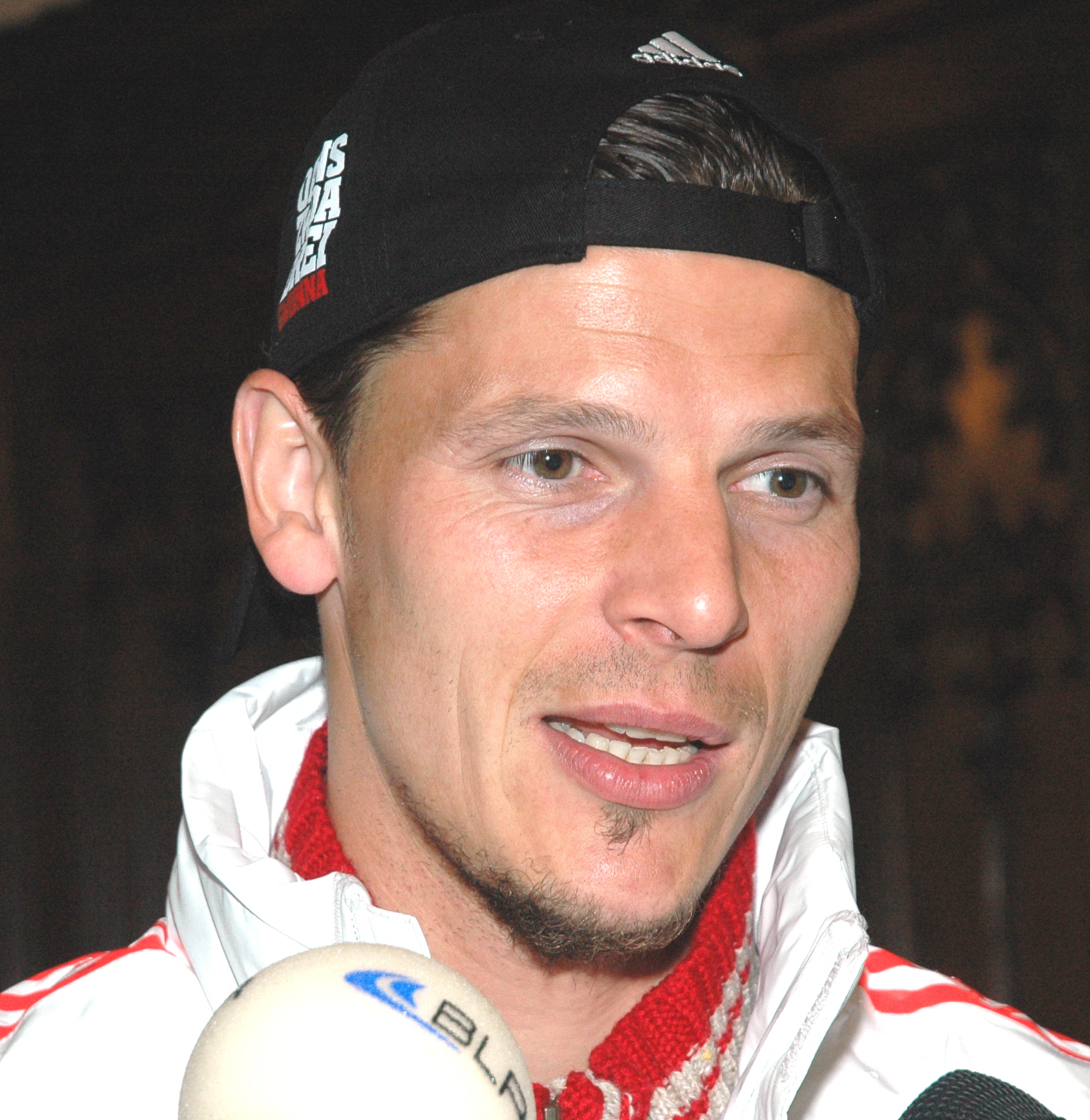
Daniel Van Buyten

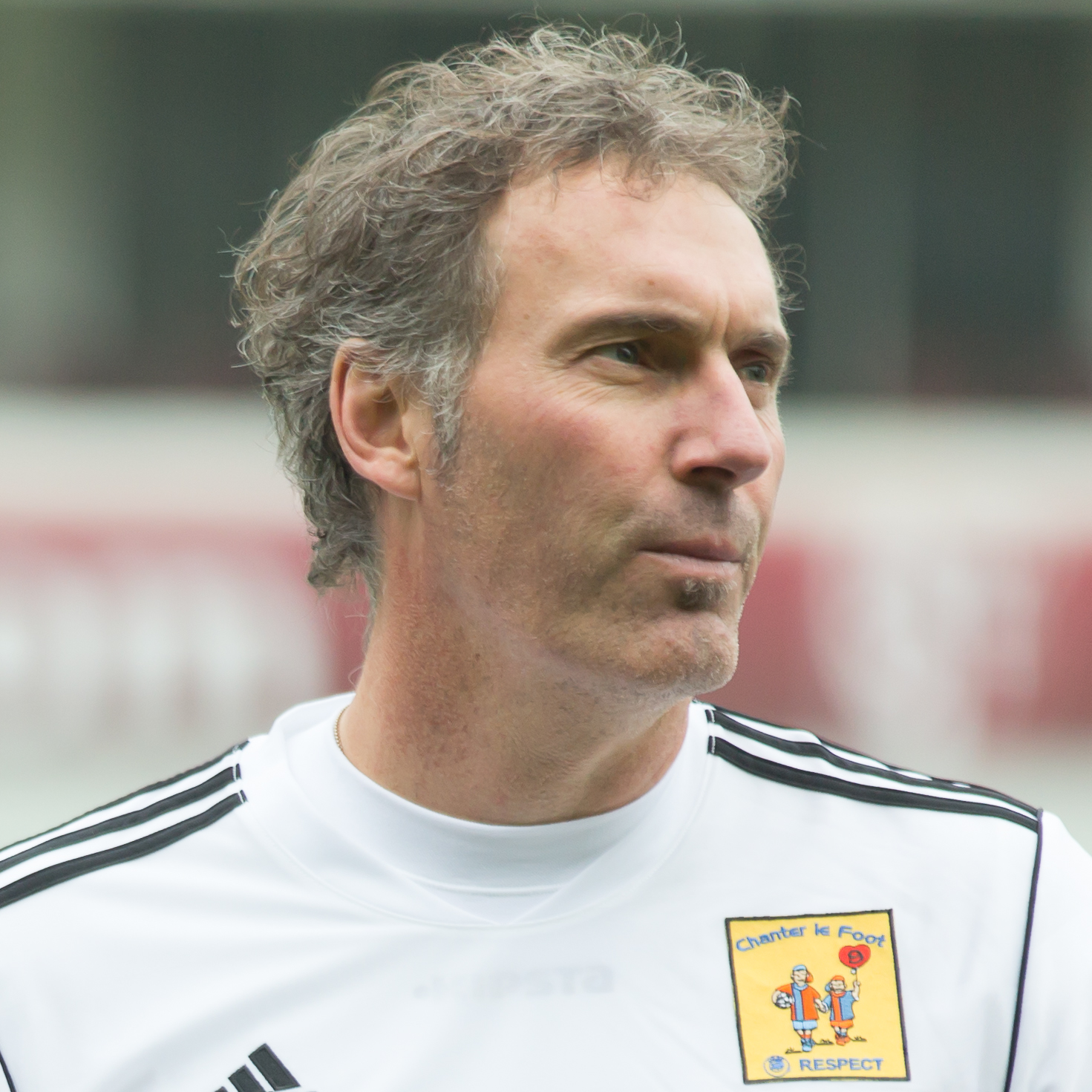
Laurent Blanc

Name	Nationality	Position	Marseille career	Appearances	Goals	Notes
Fabrice Abriel	France	MF	2009–2011	76	2	
Joseph Alcazar	France	FW	1927–1936; 1940–1942	115	92	
Morgan Amalfitano	France	MF	2011–2013	85	3	
Manuel Amoros	France	DF	1989–1993; 1995–1996	168	2	
Gunnar Andersson	Sweden; France	FW	1950–1958	247	194	
Jocelyn Angloma	France	DF	1991–1994	106	4	
Frank Anguissa	Cameroon	MF	2015–2018	106	0	
José Anigo	France	DF	1975–1984	205	4	
André Ayew	Ghana	MF	2007–2008; 2010–2015	207	60	
Jordan Ayew	Ghana	FW	2009–2014	147	22	
Emmanuel Aznar	France	FW	1936–1952	169	118	
César Azpilicueta	Spain	DF	2011–2013	68	2	
Gérard Bacconnier	France	DF	1976–1981	137	6	
Jean-Pierre Bade	France	DF	1984–1987	122	1	
Ibrahima Bakayoko	Ivory Coast	FW	1999–2003	136	34	
**Leonardo Balerdi**	Argentina	DF	2021–	173	10	
Fabien Barthez	France	GK	1992–1995; 2003–2006	228	0	
Joey Barton	England	MF	2012–2013	33	1	
Jean Bastien	France	MF	1935–1938; 1939–1940; 1941–1949	337	14	
Michy Batshuayi	Belgium	FW	2014–2016	78	33	
Michel Baulier	France	DF	1975–1979	136	1	
Joseph-Antoine Bell	Cameroon	GK	1985–1988	137	0	
Hatem Ben Arfa	France	MF	2008–2010	91	15	
Abdelsalem Ben Miloud Salem	Morocco	DF	1946–1956	282	3	
Darío Benedetto	Argentina	FW	2019–2022	71	17	
Marc Berdoll	France	FW	1977–1980	107	53	
Habib Beye	Senegal	DF	2003–2007	174	2	
Laurent Blanc	France	DF	1997–1999	81	16	
Patrick Blondeau	France	DF	1998–2001	78	0	
Alen Bokšić	Yugoslavia; Croatia	FW	1990–1994	58	25	
Basile Boli	France	DF	1990–1994	163	26	
Laurent Bonnart	France	DF	2007–2010	138	0	
Joseph Bonnel	France	MF	1967–1973	235	67	
Bernard Bosquier	France	DF	1971–1974	112	12	
Saar Boubacar	Senegal	FW	1975–1976; 1977–1980; 1983–1984	162	67	
François Bracci	France	DF	1969–1979; 1983–1985	341	15	
Brandão	Brazil	FW	2009–2011; 2011	116	31	
Frédéric Brando	France	MF	1997–2001	135	6	
Daniel Bravo	France	FW	1998–1999	29	1	
Ferdinand Bruhin	Switzerland	MF	1933–1942	113	4	
Régis Bruneton	France	MF	1957–1963	126	5	
Robert Buigues	France	MF	1972–1977; 1978–1981	227	38	
Duje Ćaleta-Car	Croatia	DF	2018–2022	130	5	
Titi Camara	Guinea	MF	1997–1999	77	10	
Christian Caminiti	France	DF	1977–1984	115	3	
Lorik Cana	Albania	MF	2005–2009	175	8	
Georges Carnus	France	GK	1971–1974	135	0	
Tony Cascarino	Ireland	FW	1994–1997	105	70	
Bernard Casoni	France	DF	1990–1996	221	3	
Fabio Celestini	Switzerland	MF	2002–2005	77	1	
Boštjan Cesar	Slovenia	DF	2005–2007	39	1	
Benoît Cheyrou	France	MF	2007–2014	305	28	
Djibril Cissé	France	FW	2006–2009	58	24	
Édouard Cissé	France	MF	2009–2011	77	1	
Renato Civelli	Argentina	DF	2006–2007; 2008–2009	63	6	
Max Conchy	France	DF	1932–1935; 1938–1942; 1944–1945	125	9	
Émile Dahan	France	DF	1942–1950	199	4	
Georges Dard	France	MF	1936–1937; 1938–1948; 1949–1954	325	105	
Jean-Charles De Bono	France	MF	1980–1985	120	10	
Didier Deschamps	France	MF	1989–1990; 1991–1994	157	9	
Marcel Desailly	France	DF	1992–1993	60	2	
Jean-Pierre Destrumelle	France	MF	1966–1970	133	2	
Abdoulaye Diallo	Senegal	FW	1983–1990	181	22	
Alou Diarra	France	MF	2011–2012	50	2	
Souleymane Diawara	Senegal	DF	2009–2014	164	11	
Laurent Di Lorto	France	GK	1931–1936	100	0	
Éric Di Meco	France	DF	1980–1986; 1988–1994	277	13	
Jean Djorkaeff	France	DF	1966–1970	159	12	
Cyril Domoraud	Ivory Coast	DF	1997–1999	71	1	
Manuel dos Santos	France	DF	2000–2004	121	1	
Didier Drogba	Ivory Coast	FW	2003–2004	55	32	
Jean-Philippe Durand	France	MF	1991–1997	202	12	
Olivier Echouafni	France	MF	1994–1998	102	8	
Albert Emon	France	FW	1971–1978	152	41	
Jean-Paul Escale	France	GK	1960–1971	329	0	
Rod Fanni	France	DF	2010–2015	166	6	
Jean Fernandez	France	MF	1975–1980	165	1	
Bernard Ferrer	France	MF	1994–1997	103	26	
Demetrius Ferreira	Brazil	DF	2003–2006	85	2	
Mathieu Flamini	France	MF	2003–2004	24	0	
Hervé Florès	France	FW	1975–1981	156	37	
Karlheinz Förster	Germany	DF	1986–1990	135	8	
Enzo Francescoli	Uruguay	FW	1989–1990	40	11	
William Gallas	France	DF	1997–2001	108	3	
Christophe Galtier	France	DF	1985–1987; 1995–1997	139	0	
Bruno Germain	France	MF	1988–1991; 1994–1995	159	13	
Valère Germain	France	FW	2017–2021	159	31	
André-Pierre Gignac	France	FW	2010–2015	186	77	
Alain Giresse	France	MF	1986–1988	83	8	
Joseph Gonzales	France	DF	1936–1946	173	5	
Lucho González	Argentina	MF	2009–2012	124	21	
Jocelyn Gourvennec	France	MF	1998–1999	29	5	
Maurice Gransart	France	DF	1948–1949; 1951–1961	288	5	
Gilbert Gress	France	MF	1971–1973	119	11	
Mattéo Guendouzi	France	MF	2021–2024	103	10	
Luiz Gustavo	Brazil	MF	2017–2019	98	10	
Gabriel Heinze	Argentina	DF	2009–2011	77	10	
Brahim Hemdani	Algeria	MF	2000–2005	121	2	
Luis Henrique	Brazil	FW	2020–2025	108	11	
Vitorino Hilton	Brazil	DF	2008–2011	81	3	
Jean-Louis Hodoul	Algeria	DF	1964–1972	215	3	
Pierre Issa	South Africa	DF	1995–2001	59	1	
Jairzinho	Brazil	FW	1974–1975	25	13	
Hamada Jambay	Madagascar	DF	1993–1999	140	5	
Gunnar Johansson	Sweden	DF	1950–1958	255	5	
Joseph Yegba Maya	Cameroon	FW	1962–1970	237	112	
Charles Kaboré	Burkina Faso	MF	2007–2013	194	3	
Boubacar Kamara	France	MF	2016–2022	170	4	
Willy Kohut	Hungary	FW	1933–1939	183	92	
Bakari Koné	Ivory Coast	FW	2008–2010	80	16	
Andreas Köpke	Germany	GK	1996–1998	77	0	
Édouard Kula	France	DF	1970–1973	123	2	
Marc Lévy	France	GK	1980–1986	164	0	
Marc Libbra	France	FW	1990–1992; 1993; 1998	149	41	
Armand Libérati	France	GK	1980–1986	149	0	
Jacques Lopez	France	DF	1979–1985	143	6	
Jean-Pierre Lopez	France	DF	1967–1975	231	2	
Maxime Lopez	France	MF	2016–2021	150	5	
Roger Magnusson	Sweden	FW	1970–1974	204	33	
Steve Mandanda	France	GK	2007–2016; 2017–2022	613	0	
Jean-Jacques Marcel	France	MF	1954–1959	175	27	
Louis de Maréville	France	FW	1942–1947	116	73	
Steve Marlet	France	FW	2003–2005	69	17	
Florian Maurice	France	FW	1998–2001	83	30	
Modeste M'Bami	Cameroon	MF	2006–2009	100	1	
Chancel Mbemba	Democratic Republic of the Congo	DF	2022–2025	85	13	
Stéphane Mbia	Cameroon	MF	2009–2012	112	5	
Abdoulaye Meïté	Ivory Coast	DF	2000–2006	155	4	
Benjamin Mendy	France	DF	2013–2016	94	3	
François Mercurio	France	MF	1949–1958	134	24	
Barthélemy Mesas	France	MF	1951–1958	167	7	
Gérard Migeon	France	GK	1974–1981	216	0	
François Milazzo	France	MF	1960–1964	123	32	
Jean Molla	France	DF	1954–1961	213	5	
Jérémy Morel	France	DF	2011–2015	153	3	
Fernando Morientes	Spain	FW	2009–2011	19	1	
Carlos Mozer	Brazil	DF	1989–1992	118	6	
Samir Nasri	France	MF	2004–2008	166	12	
Nicolas Nkoulou	Cameroon	DF	2011–2016	201	5	
Mamadou Niang	Senegal	FW	2005–2010	227	100	
Jacques Novi	France	MF	1967–1973	241	14	
Lucas Ocampos	Argentina	FW	2015–2019	132	27	
Franciszek Olejniczak	Poland; France	MF	1936–1946	192	10	
Pascal Olmeta	France	GK	1990–1993	112	0	
Jean Paluch	France	MF	1954–1958	131	8	
Jean-Pierre Papin	France	FW	1986–1992	275	182	
Marc Pascal	France	FW	1978–1985	171	72	
Dimitri Payet	France	MF	2013–2015; 2017–2023	326	78	
Abedi Pele	Ghana	FW	1987–1989; 1990–1993	149	30	
Robert Pires	France	FW	1998–2000	93	14	
Félix Pironti	France	MF	1939–1949	211	89	
Stéphane Porato	France	GK	1998–2000	80	0	
Adil Rami	France	DF	2017–2019	75	3	
Fabrizio Ravanelli	Italy	FW	1997–1999	84	31	
Loïc Rémy	France	FW	2010–2013	111	42	
Franck Ribéry	France	MF	2005–2007	89	18	
Jean Robin	France	FW	1939–1953	226	74	
Sauveur Rodriguez	France	FW	1946–1951	164	6	
Rolando	Portugal	DF	2015–2019	123	7	
Alaixys Romao	Togo	MF	2013–2016	127	4	
Valentin Rongier	France	MF	2019–2025	196	6	
Eric Roy	France	MF	1996–1999	104	12	
Vedran Runje	Croatia	GK	2001–2004	103	0	
Dominique Rustichelli	France	MF	1952–1958	149	37	
Hiroki Sakai	Japan	DF	2016–2021	185	2	
Morgan Sanson	France	MF	2017–2021	157	27	
Étienne Sansonetti	France	FW	1958–1964	120	40	
Franck Sauzée	France	MF	1988–1990; 1991–1993	164	39	
Albert Sejnera	France	DF	1963–1966	101	0	
Roger Scotti	France	MF	1942–1958	451	65	
Josip Skoblar	Yugoslavia	FW	1966–1967; 1969–1975	210	175	
Dragan Stojković	Yugoslavia	MF	1990–1991; 1992–1994	37	5	
Taye Taiwo	Nigeria	DF	2004–2011	271	25	
André Tassone	France	DF	1959–1969	234	2	
Florian Thauvin	France	FW	2013–2015; 2016–2021	281	86	
Jean-Christophe Thomas	France	MF	1992–1994	45	1	
Jean Tigana	France	MF	1989–1991	76	1	
Marius Trésor	France	DF	1972–1980	298	12	
Mathieu Valbuena	France	MF	2006–2014	330	38	
Daniel Van Buyten	Belgium	DF	2001–2004	98	15	
Philippe Vercruysse	France	MF	1988–1991	131	36	
Rudi Völler	Germany	FW	1992–1994	73	28	
Chris Waddle	England	FW	1989–1992	140	27	
Mario Zatelli	France	FW	1935–1938; 1943–1944; 1945–1948	149	99	
Boudewijn Zenden	Netherlands	MF	2007–2009	76	6	
Émile Zermani	France	FW	1933–1939	166	52	
Karim Ziani	Algeria	MF	2007–2009	68	3	
Ronald Zubar	France	DF	2006–2009	100	3	
Jules Zvunka	France	DF	1966–1973	298	0	
Victor Zvunka	France	DF	1973–1981	295	6	

== External ==
- (in French) om1899.com player history
