= 1943 Coupe de France final =

- Event: 1942–43 Coupe de France
| Marseille | Girondins ASP |
| Marseille | Girondins ASP |
| 2 | 2 |
- After extra time
- Date: 9 May 1943
- Venue: Olympique Yves-du-Manoir, Colombes
- Referee: Victor Sdez
- Attendance: 32,005

Replay
| Marseille | Girondins ASP |
| 4 | 0 |
- Date: 22 May 1943
- Venue: Olympique Yves-du-Manoir, Colombes
- Referee: Victor Sdez
- Attendance: 32,212

The 1943 Coupe de France final was a football match held at Stade Olympique Yves-du-Manoir, Colombes and Parc des Princes, Paris on 9 and 22 May 1943. It saw Olympique de Marseille defeat Girondins ASP 4–0 in the replay thanks to goals by Emmanuel Aznar (2), Georges Dard and Félix Pironti.

== Match details ==
=== First match ===
9 May 1943

| Marseille | 2–2 (a.e.t.) | Girondins ASP |
|---|---|---|
| Pironti 4'; Robin 55' | | Patrone 56' (o.g.); Persillon 82' |

Stade Olympique Yves-du-Manoir, Colombes
Attendance: 32,005
Referee: Victor Sdez

| GK | (France) Jacques Delachet |
| DF | (France) Paul Patrone |
| DF | (France) Joseph Gonzales |
| DF | (France) Jean Veneziano |
| DF | (France) Jean Bastien |
| MF | (France) (Poland) Franz Olejniczak "Olej" |
| MF | (France) Georges Dard |
| FW | (France) Roger Scotti |
| FW | (France) Emmanuel Aznar (c) |
| FW | (France) Jean Robin |
| FW | (France) Félix Pironti |
Manager:
(France) Joseph Gonzales Assistant Referees: Fourth Official:

| GK | (France) André Gérard (c) |
| DF | (France) Michel Homar |
| DF | (France) Roger Normand |
| DF | (France) Nordine Ben Ali |
| DF | (Spain) Francisco Mateo |
| MF | (France) Said Ben Arab |
| MF | (France) Alphonse Rolland |
| FW | (France) Ahmed Nemeur |
| FW | (Spain) Santiago Urtizberea |
| FW | (France) René Persillon |
| FW | (France) Henri Arnaudeau |
Manager:
(Spain) Santiago Urtizberea

Ahmed Nemeur was not eligible to play the match and the federation gave the cup to Marseille. However, Colonel Joseph Pascot (member of the Commissariat général à l'Éducation générale et sportive) decided that the final had to be played on the field to know the real winner, that is why the final was replayed.

=== Replay ===
22 May 1943

| Marseille | 4–0 | Girondins ASP |
|---|---|---|
| Aznar 32', 63'; Dard 56'; Pironti 78' |

Stade Olympique Yves-du-Manoir, Colombes
Attendance: 32,212
Referee: Victor Sdez

| GK | (France) Jacques Delachet |
| DF | (France) Paul Patrone |
| DF | (France) Joseph Gonzales |
| DF | (France) Jean Veneziano |
| DF | (France) Jean Bastien |
| MF | (France) (Poland) Franz Olejniczak "Olej" |
| MF | (France) Georges Dard |
| FW | (France) Roger Scotti |
| FW | (France) Emmanuel Aznar (c) |
| FW | (France) Jean Robin |
| FW | (France) Félix Pironti |
Manager:
(France) Joseph Gonzales Assistant Referees: Fourth Official:

| GK | (France) André Gérard (c) |
| DF | (France) Michel Homar |
| DF | (France) Roger Normand |
| DF | (France) Nordine Ben Ali |
| DF | (Spain) Francisco Mateo |
| MF | (France) Said Ben Arab |
| MF | (France) Alphonse Rolland |
| FW | (France) René Persillon |
| FW | (Spain) Santiago Urtizberea |
| FW | (France) Claude Pruvot |
| FW | (France) Henri Arnaudeau |
Manager:
(Spain) Santiago Urtizberea

== See also ==
- 1942–43 Coupe de France
