= Mancisidor =

Mancisidor is a Spanish surname. Notable people with the surname include:

- Alejo Mancisidor (born 1970), Spanish tennis player
- Jaime Mancisidor (1910–?), Spanish footballer
- José Mancisidor (1894–1956), Mexican writer, historian and politician
- Xabier Mancisidor (born 1970), Spanish footballer and coach
