= Morado (surname) =

Morado is a Spanish surname. Notable people with this surname include:

- Jia Morado (born 1995), Filipina volleyball player
- José Chávez Morado (1909-2002), Mexican artist
- Tomás Chávez Morado (1914-2001), Mexican artist
