= Tomás Chávez Morado =

- Born: December 29, 1914; Silao, Mexico
- Died: December 21, 2001 (aged 76); Guanajuato, Mexico
- Occupation: sculptor
- Years active: late 20th century

Tomás Chávez Morado (December 29, 1914 – December 21, 2001) was an artist from Silao, Guanajuato, Mexico. He taught at public schools, the Instituto Nacional de Bellas Artes y Literatura, and the Escuela de Artes Plásticas at the Universidad de Guanajuato, where he served as the director of the School of Visual Arts. His civic installations include El Paraguas and the national shield carving displayed at the National Museum of Anthropology in Mexico City as well as 260 monumental eagle head sculptures marking the route of Hidalgo the Liberator (see Miguel Hidalgo y Costilla). According to Mexican Life, Mexico's Monthly Review, the work of Chávez Morado "creates visions of typical life in the streets, images of people one might find in the markets, at the ferias or inside the tenement patios, with a thematic emphasis on love and the mother and child."

== Life ==
Tomás was one of four children born to José Ignacio Chávez Montes de Oca, a shop keeper, and María de la Luz Morado Cabrera, an amateur painter. His three brothers include José Chávez Morado, Gabriel, and Salvador (who died as a young boy). His mother and maternal uncles who drew sketches were among his first examples of artists. His father also encouraged his creativity by providing him with materials to practice. During the 1918 flu pandemic, also known as the “Spanish flu,” his mother, María de la Luz Cabrera Morado, fell ill and died from influenza. José Ignacio Chávez Montes de Oca remarried and started a new family while his sisters cared for Tomás and his brothers. While in the care of their paternal aunts who often sang, played guitar, and painted, Tomás and José both took a greater interest in art. Tomás completed his primary school education. During this time he worked in his father's grocery store, where it appeared that he might become a merchant like his father. Tomás felt that this type of work seemed "tedious, enslaving, and boring" and instead immersed himself in the libraries of his paternal grandfather and of the father-in-law of José Ignacio Chávez Montes de Oca. At one point he also worked for the father-in-law of José Ignacio Chávez Montes de Oca (who was a sculptor and print maker who repaired religious images) as a printer and a bookbinder. In 1928, as a teenager, Tomás decided to move to Mexico City to pursue a career in art and teaching at the Escuela Normal Superior and also to connect with his brother, José. His father, who wanted to discourage Tomás from this decision, gave him only two pesos when Tomás asked for money to help him on his new journey. José and Tomás faced a difficult financial situation in Mexico City, having no place to sleep until granted permission by Fernando Leal to sleep at the Centro Popular de Pintura de Nonoalco where José, and eventually Tomás, took classes. After seeing monolith carvings at the Museum of Archaeology, Tomás reaffirmed his commitment to sculpture. He was also exposed to the work of Diego Rivera while visiting La Escuela Muralista. Taking experience and skill from El Centro Popular de Pintura Nonoalco, Tomás began teaching modeling and drawing at primary and secondary public schools in Mexico City. At the same time, he was working in the Department of Museology at the Instituto Nacional de Bellas Artes where he helped rescue the work of José Guadalupe Posada. In 1940, he accepted a commission from the Department of Indian Affairs to lead an indigenous boarding school in the Sierra Tarahumara for the Tarahumara people, an experience that impassioned him to indigenous causes. After four years there, he returned to Mexico City to attend the Escuela Normal Superior (Mexico) to study and become a professor in the field of Visual Arts. He graduated in 1948 with a masters of arts education in the Department of Fine Arts and eventually joined the faculty to depart his knowledge of sculpture onto others. In 1968, after 33 years of teaching under the Secretaría de Educación Pública, Tomás moved back to Guanajuato to retire and dedicate himself to his sculpture. Many students sought out his advice during this time, which lead him to start teaching again in 1985, this time, at the Universidad de Guanajuato. Because the University of Guanajuato did not have appropriate facilities, Tomás instructed his students in his own studio. Between 1990 and 1993, Tomás directed the school of fine arts, improving studio facilities and making needed changes that lead to official approval of the visual arts bachelor's degree program. Tomás continued teaching until health problems (diabetes, blindness, and hearing loss) hindered his teaching and, eventually, his sculpting.

== Selected works ==
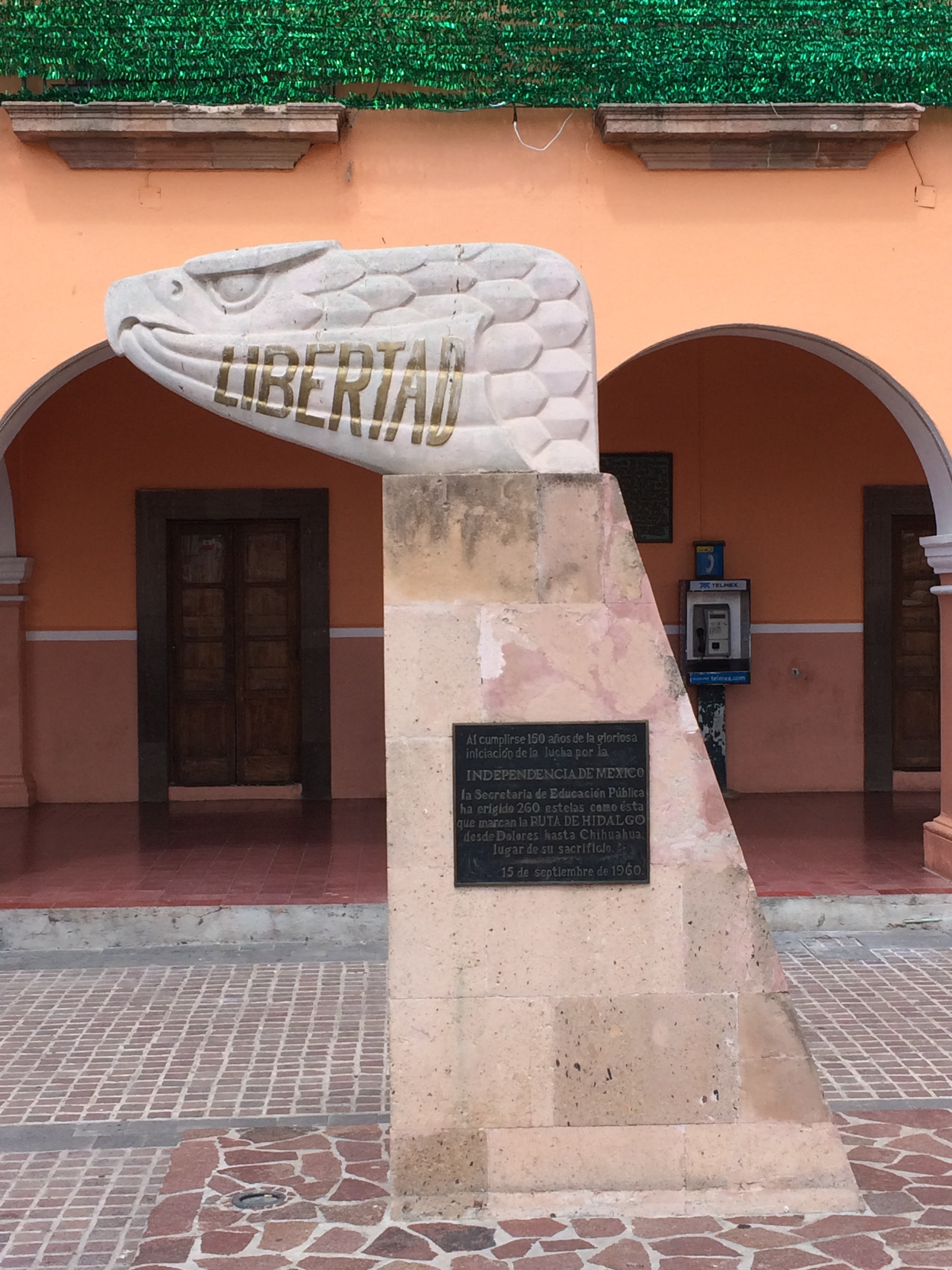
One of 260 eagle heads eagle heads serves as a monument along the route of Hidalgo the Liberator.

Commissioned Works

1960 Eagle heads monument

- In 1960, Tomás worked with the Secretariat of Public Education of Mexico to design and execute an educational and cultural monument that commemorated the 150th anniversary of Mexico's independence in 1910. The monument includes 260 concrete eagle heads inscribed with the word “Libertad” which Tomás supervised the casting of. The ministry installed the eagle heads at various locations along the route of Hidalgo the Liberator, or Miguel Hidalgo y Costilla, who is known for “El Grito de Dolores,” the battle cry of the Mexican Independence. The route starts in Dolores Hidalgo, Guanajuato, and ends in Monte de las Cruces in the city of Chihuahua, Chihuahua. The ministry also held cultural and educational festivals at the site of every eagle head to celebrate the installation. President Adolfo Lopez Mateo and Governor of the state of Chihuahua, Teofilo Borunda, participated by placing bronze plaques on the first and last eagles of the route. Each stele is marked with a plaque inscribed: “Ruta de Hidalgo, 1810-1811, Año de la Patria 1960.”

1964 National shield in marble on the main façade of the National Museum of Anthropology in Mexico City.

1960 Monumento a Jesús Gonzalez Ortega located in the state of Guanajuato.

---- Masks of Jiménez and Guerrero at the Heroes section of the Museo del Caracol and replicas of these for the community of Charco de Pantoja in Moroleón.

1974 Homenaje del Pueblo: Monumento al Padre Hidalgo sculpted with bronze reliefs for the city of Acámbaro.

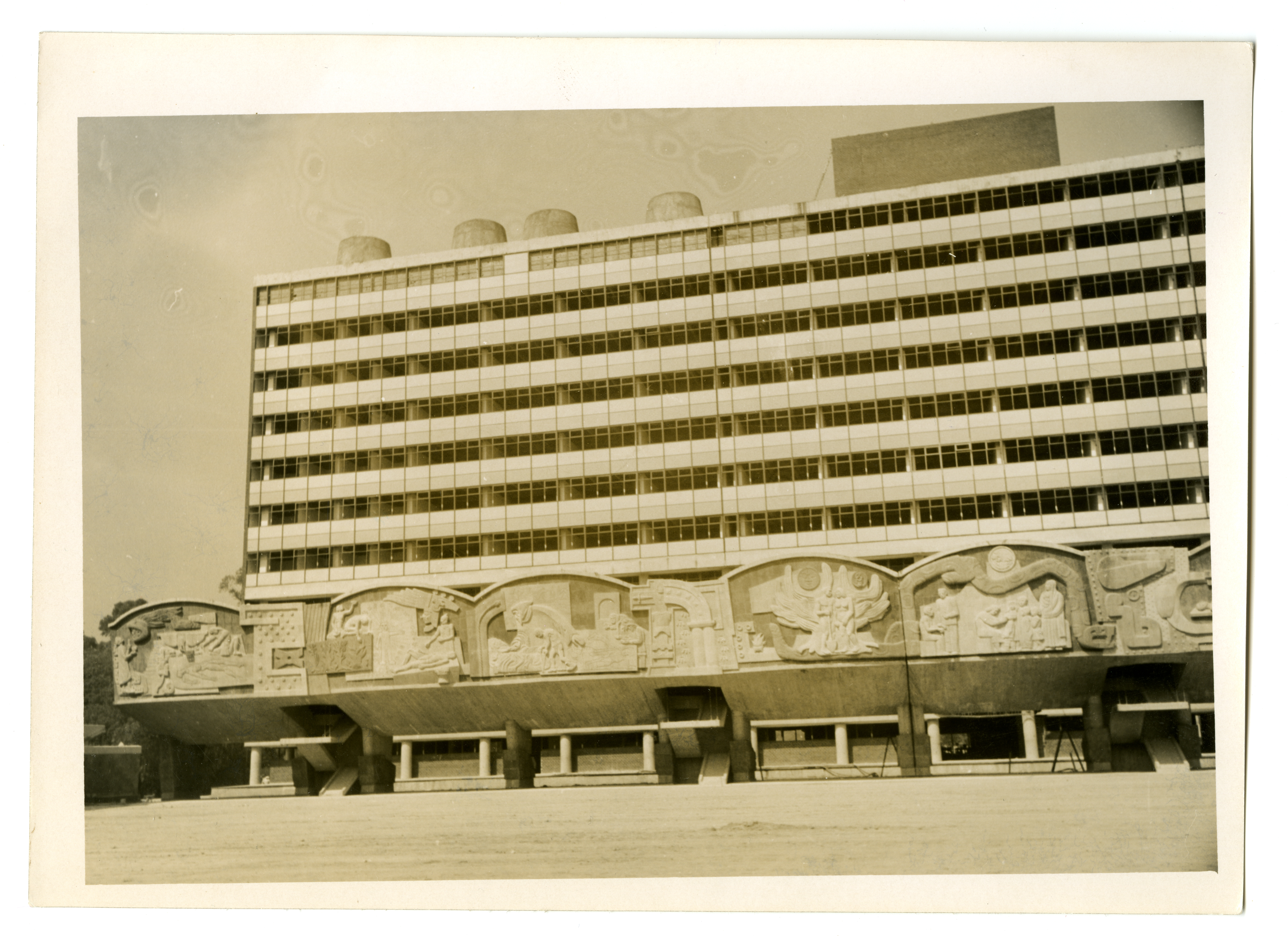
A frieze at National Medical Center Siglo XXI, Mexico, D.F.

1976 Sculptures dedicated to Alonso García Bravo (the first urban planner of Mexico City) located at the Plaza de la Merced in Mexico City.

---- Sixteen wood carved boards that are part of the gigantic doors for the Nikko National Park in Shimoimachi, Japan.

1962 493 busts of Ignacio Zaragoza for the primary schools of the Mexican Republic.

Collaborative Works with José Chávez Morado

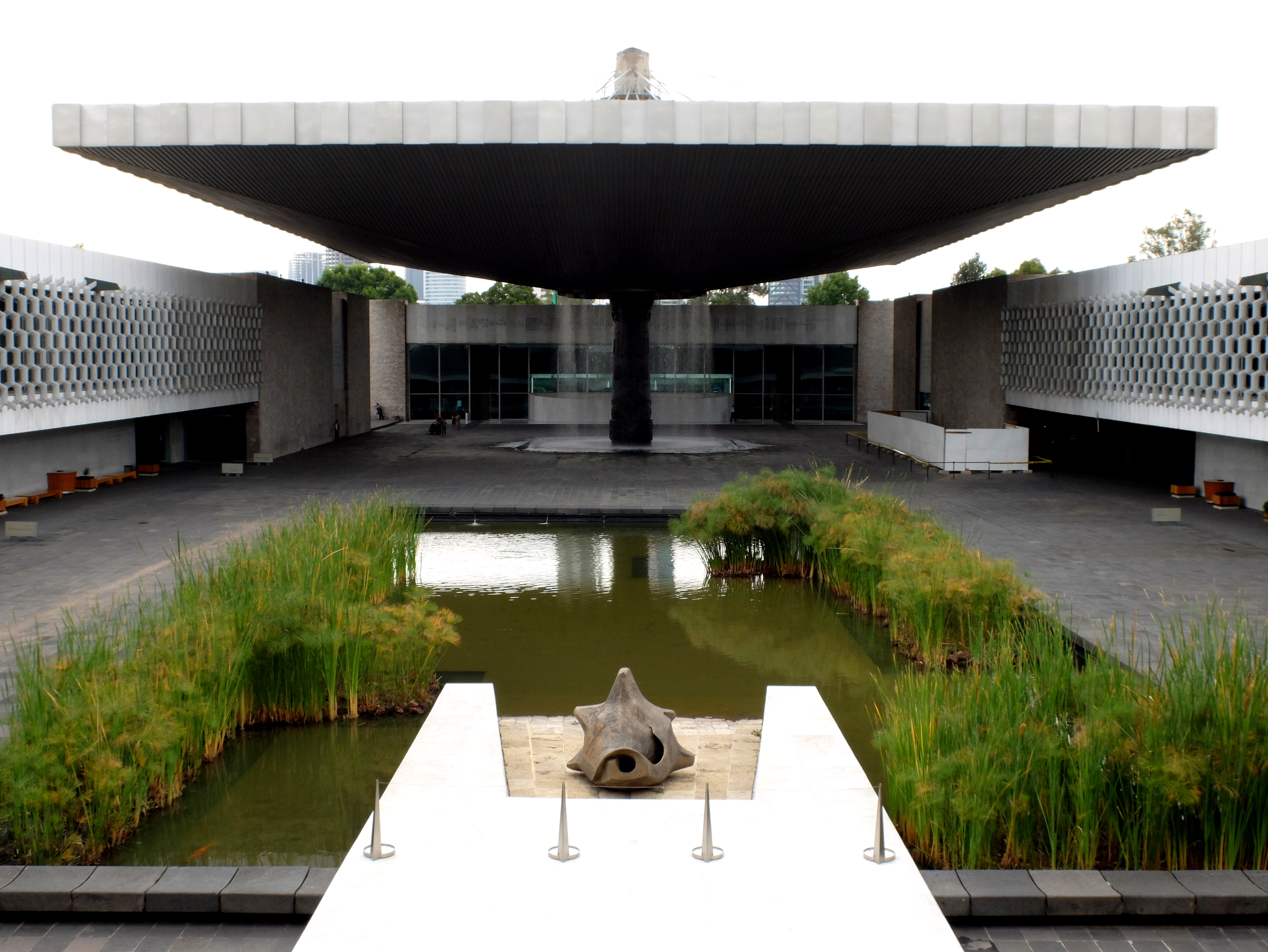
The Central Courtyard Umbrella.

1958 The frieze and the decoration of the classrooms of the Centro Médico de México D.F., now the Centro Médico Nacional Siglo XXI.

1960 Bronze doors titled Componentes Raciales y Culturales del Mexico Moderno at the Museo del Caracol in Mexico City.

1964 El Paraguas (The Umbrella) bronze column located in the central courtyard of the National Museum of Anthropology in Mexico City.

- Approximately two months before the 1964 grand opening of the National Museum of Anthropology, José and Tomás Chávez Morado were commissioned to design and execute the veneer for the central court yard column. The 11 meters tall column is often referred to as El Paraguas, or Umbrella, a function of the piece, which appears to hold a cantilevered roof over the courtyard, protecting visitors from the rain. The piece is titled Imagen de Mexico, or Image of Mexico, and highlights “an Indian head and the head of a Spanish person that coalesce into a new race. In modern times, the atom [represents] the struggle for peace.”

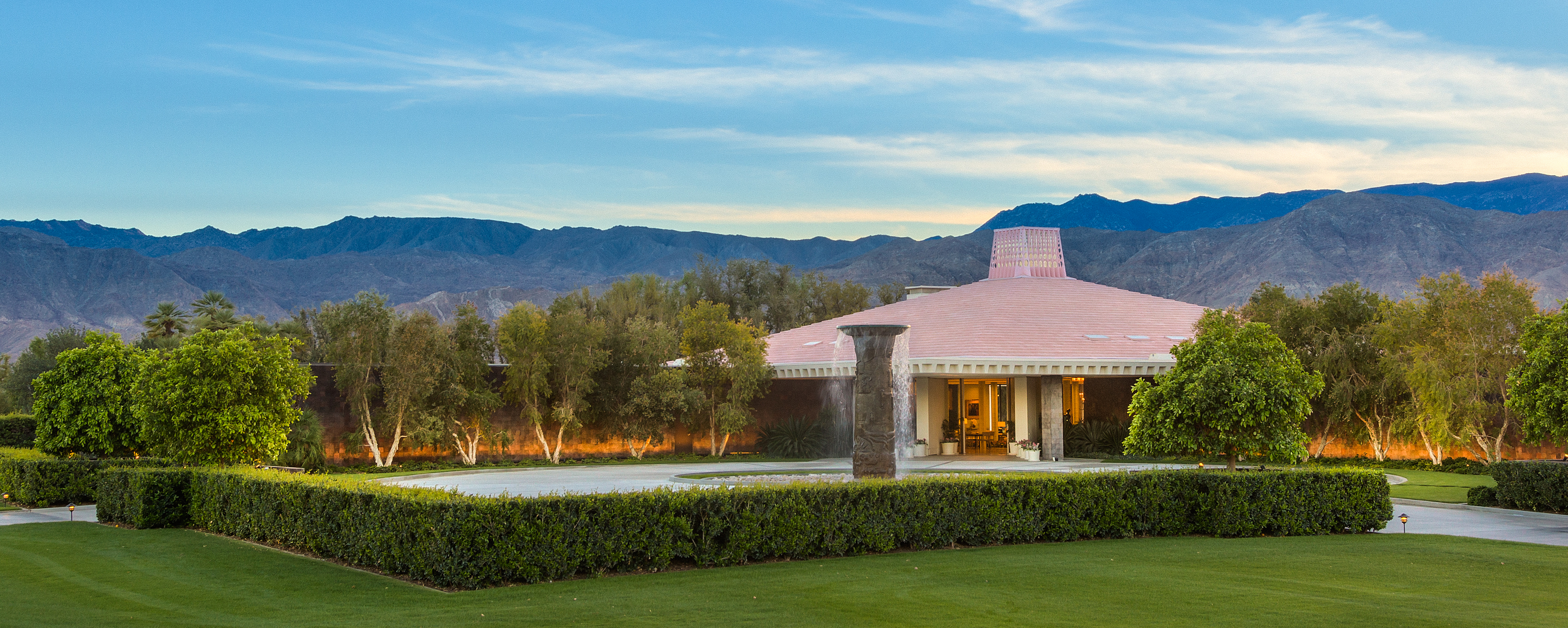
A columnar fountain titled Imagen de Mexico at the Annenberg estate in Rancho Mirage, California.

1968 Imagen de México (Image of Mexico) bronze column located at the entrance of the historic estate Sunnylands, the former winter home of Walter and Leonore Annenberg.

Other Works

1982 Monumento a la Victoria de los Liberales Sobre los Conservadores, a gift to the city of Silao.

1961 Homenaje a los Constructores de la Ciudad de Mexico, the main piece of an exhibition produced by the Salon of Mexican Plastic Arts.

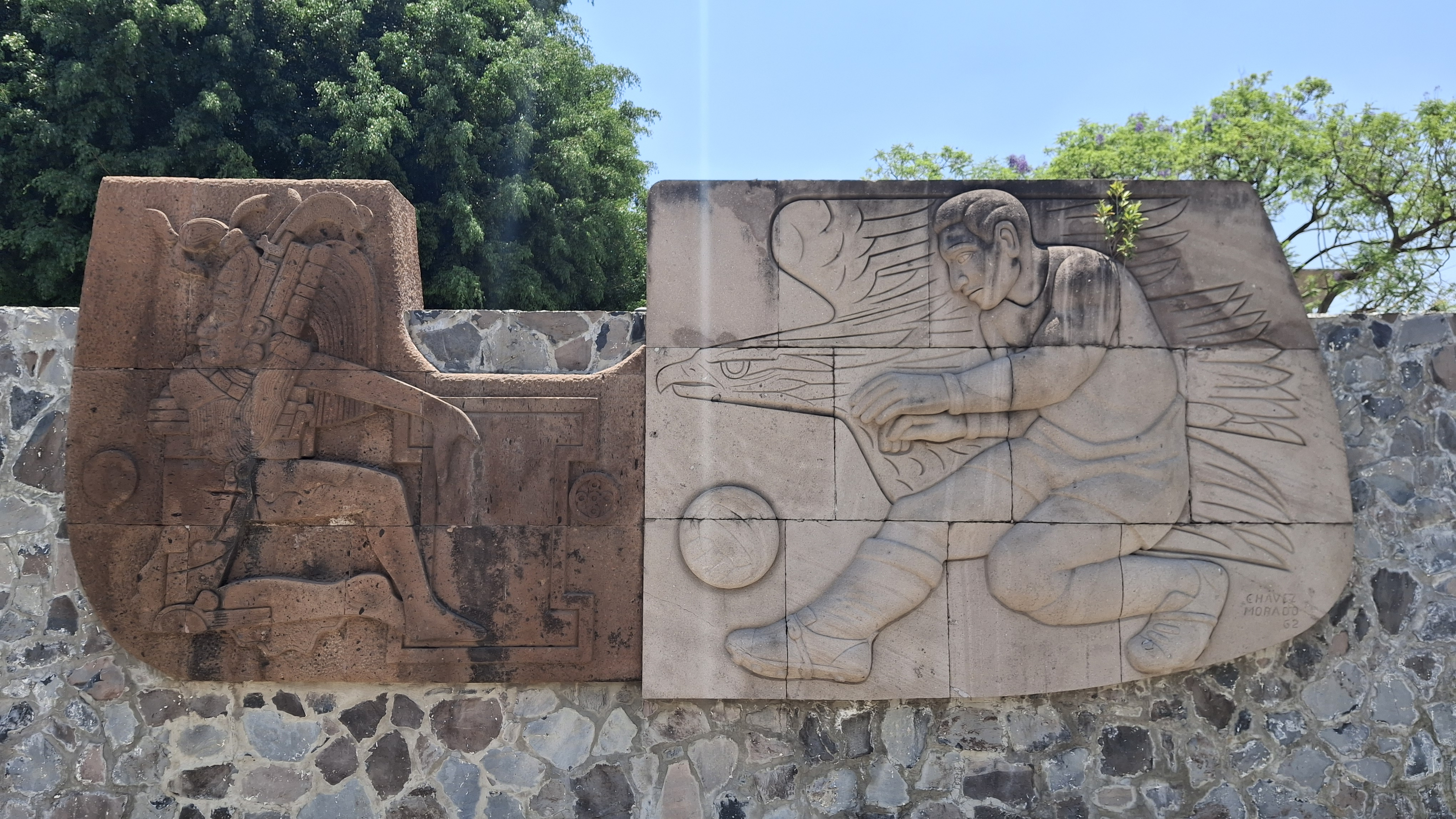
Relief sculpture in the López Mateos Sports Unit of Guadalajara, representing the Mesoamerican ball game and soccer.

1962 Relief sculpture in the López Mateos Sports Unit of Guadalajara, representing the Mesoamerican ballgame and soccer.

---- Maquette of the City of Guanajuato and its Surroundings for the permanent exhibitions hall at the Museo Regional de la Alhóndiga de Granaditas.

== Exhibitions ==
Tomás Chávez Morado has exhibited independently and collectively in multiple locations including Galería de la Arte Plástica Mexicana, Galería Merckuper, Galería Chapultepec, Galería Posada, Galería Romano, Galería Misrachi; and in Mexican cities including Morelia, Michoacán, León, Silao, Irapuato, San Francisco del Rincón, Celaya, and Aguascalientes. His paintings have been exhibited in cities such as León, Celaya, Guanajuato, Silao, and Romita . There is a permanent collection of his works at the Museo del José y Tomás Chávez Morado in Silao, Guanajuato. His works have shown posthumous in exhibitions, such as in Deseando lo real Austria Contemporánea in October, 2012, and Formas de Libertad at the University of Guanajuato in August, 2014.

== List of Exhibitions ==
August 18 – September 13, 1954	“Cincuenta jóvenes artistas mexicanos” (Fifty Young Mexican Artists), Salón de la Plástica Mexicana, Mexico City
1956	“Raíz autóctona y celo ancestral: 24 esculturas de Tomás Chávez Morado” (Native Root and Ancestral Zeal: 24 Sculptures of Tomás Chávez Morado), Salón de la Plástica Mexicana, Mexico City
September – October 8, 1956	“Nuevos valores” (New Values), Salón de la Plástica Mexicana, Mexico City
December, 1957	“Arte Mexicano, óleos, acuarelas, gouaches, dibujos, y esculturas” (Mexican Art, Oils, Watercolors, Gouaches, Drawings, and Sculptures), Salón de la Plástica Mexicana, Mexico City
December 9 – 31, 1957	Exhibition of 17 sculptures of Tomás Chávez Morado
1957	“El salón de la escultura en la Alameda central” (The Exhibition of Sculpture in Alameda), International Institution of Fine Arts and Secretary of Public Education, National Museum of Modern Art, Mexico City
October 10, 1958	“Exposición colectiva de los maestros de artes plásticas” (Collective Exhibition of the Masters of Plastic Arts), National Institute of Fine Arts and Secretary of Public Education, Galería Jose Clemente Orozco
October 28, 1958	General catalog of the National Museum of Art, Mexico City, International Institution of Fine Arts and Secretary of Public Education, Salón de Arte Mexicano, Mexico City
1958	“Salón annual de la escultura” (Annual Sculpture Salon), Salón de la Plástica Mexicana, Mexico City
June 10 – July 10, 1958	Exposition of collective sculpture, Salón de la Plástica Mexicana, Mexico City
December 8 – 31, 1958	“Gran venta de Navidad de arte mexicano,” Salón de la Plástica Mexicana, Mexico City
April, 1958	"Exposición de óleos y grabados de Isiordo Ocampo, dibujos de Jorge Tovar y escultoras de Tomás Chávez Morado" (Exhibition of Oils and Watercolors by Isiordo Ocampo, Drawings of Jorge Tovar, and Sculptures by Tomás Chávez Morado), Galerías Chapultepec
1959	"Exposición colectiva en al Salón de la Escultura" (Collective Exhibition in the Salon of Sculpture), Salón de la Plástica Mexicana
1959	Exposición en el Consulado de México (Exhibition at the Mexican Consulate), San Antonio, Texas, United States
1959	"Mexican Art Gallery," San Antonio, Texas, United States, International Institution of Fine Arts and Secretary of Public Education
1959	"Maestros de artes plásticas" (Masters of Plastic Arts), International Institution of Fine Arts, Galería Chapultepec
December 11, 1959	"Exposición colectiva de invierno de artistas profesionales." (Winter Group Exhibition of Professional Artists), International Institution of Fine Arts and Secretary of Public Education, Galería Chapultepec
December 7, 1959 – January 7, 1960	"Gran venta de Navidad," Salón de la Plástica Mexicana, Mexico City
April, 1961	Individual Exhibition of Works, Salón de la Plástica Mexicana, Mexico City
November 25, 1960	"Escultura mexicana contemporánea" (Contemporary Mexican Sculpture)International Institution of Fine Arts, Department of Fine Arts
December 9, 1962 – January 10, 1963	"Venta de Navidad," Salón de la Plástica Mexicana, Mexico City
February, 1963	Exhibition of paintings and sculpture organized by the Comité pro Día de la Mujer and the Centro Libanés, Mexico City
April 11 – May 5, 1964	"Esculturas de Tomás Chávez" (Sculpture of Tomás Chávez), Salón de la Plástica Mexicana
January, 1974	Cultural Events Festival XIII, exhibition at the City Hall of the city of Leon, Guanajuato
September 20, 1977	Exhibition at the opening of the House of Culture of Irapuato, National Institute of Fine Arts, Ministry of Education and Culture, ISSSTE
1978	Exhibition at the Festival de Leon at the Municipal Civil Administration building, organized by the municipal president, Roberto Plascencia
February 8, 1979	Exhibition at the House of Culture of Michoacán, Moreli, Michoacan
	Exhibition at the Luis H. Ducoing Gallery of the Manuel Doblado Theater, León, Guanajuato
January 11, 1984	Pictorial exhibition auction to raise funds in the CEEM en Leon, Guanajuato
August, 1984	“Expo-mixturas de seis ciudades” (Expo mixtures of six cities), Convention Center in Leon, Guanajuato
October, 1984	“Expo-mixturas de seis ciudades” (Expo mixtures of six cities), Legislative Palace in Guanajuato, Guanajuato
August 22, 1985	“1 er. Encuentro de la plastic imagen, fuerza y estilo” (First Meeting of the Plastic Image, Strength, and Style) en el Centro de Convenciones Villas de Irapuato
November 23, 1985	“Pintores y escultores de Guanajuato” (Paintings and Sculptures of Guanajuato) in the Municipal Palace of Celaya, Guanajuato
May 7 – 30, 1987	Itinerant exhibitionTemporary Exhibition Hall, House Museum of Diego Rivera, Guanajuato, Guanajuato, National Institute of Fine Arts, Ministry of Education, Culture, and Recreation, DIF
February 27, 1987	“Artist from Central Mexico,” Latin Art. Philadelphia, P.H.
	“Muchas Horas de Vida…” (Many Hours of Life...), Exhibition of painting and sculpture of Tomás Chávez Morado, Aguascalientes Museum, Aguascalientes Cultural Institute, National Institute of Fine Arts, Mexico City
October 15, 1990	Exposición escultórica dentro del Festival Internacional Cervantino, Sala Hermenegildo Bustos, University of Guanajuato
October, 1990	Exhibition of teachers of the School of Visual Arts in the Atrium Hall of the University of Guanajuato
April, 1991	“Proyecto de monumental a las mujeres del minero fallecido” (Monumental project of the women of the deceased miner), Exhibition Hall of the National Lottery, Mexico City
	“50 aniversario de la Facultad de Medicina” de la Universidad de Guanajuato (50th anniversary of the Faculty of Medicine of the University of Guanajuato), Scientific and Cultural Week, Hotel Fiesta Americana Gallery, Leon, Guanajuato
May 1 – 5, 1995	“Obra de papel y expo-plásticos del Bajío,” Itinerant exhibition organized through Grupo Expo-Mixturas, Gallery of Permanent Art, Convention and Exhibition Center
August, 1993	“Homenaje a Guanajuato” (Homage to Guanajuato), Art Club Irapuato, A.C., Convention Center of Irapuato, Villas Irpuato
December 7, 1995 – January 7, 1996	“El Sol de León” (The Sun of Leon), Museum of the city of Leon, Institute of Culture of Guanajuato, Museo Olga Costa y José Chávez Morado
September 2017 – June 2018	"Carved Narrative: Los Hermanos Chávez Morado" at Sunnylands Center & Gardens, Rancho Mirage, California

== Sources ==
Gabriela Mijangos.Tomás Chávez Morado: Escultor. México, D. F.: La Rana, 2003. Print.

Vázquez Figueroa, María De Jesús.Tomás Chávez Morado: El Maestro Escultor. Guanajuato: Universidad De Guanajuato, 2014. Print.
