= Santiago Urtizberea =

Spanish footballer and manager

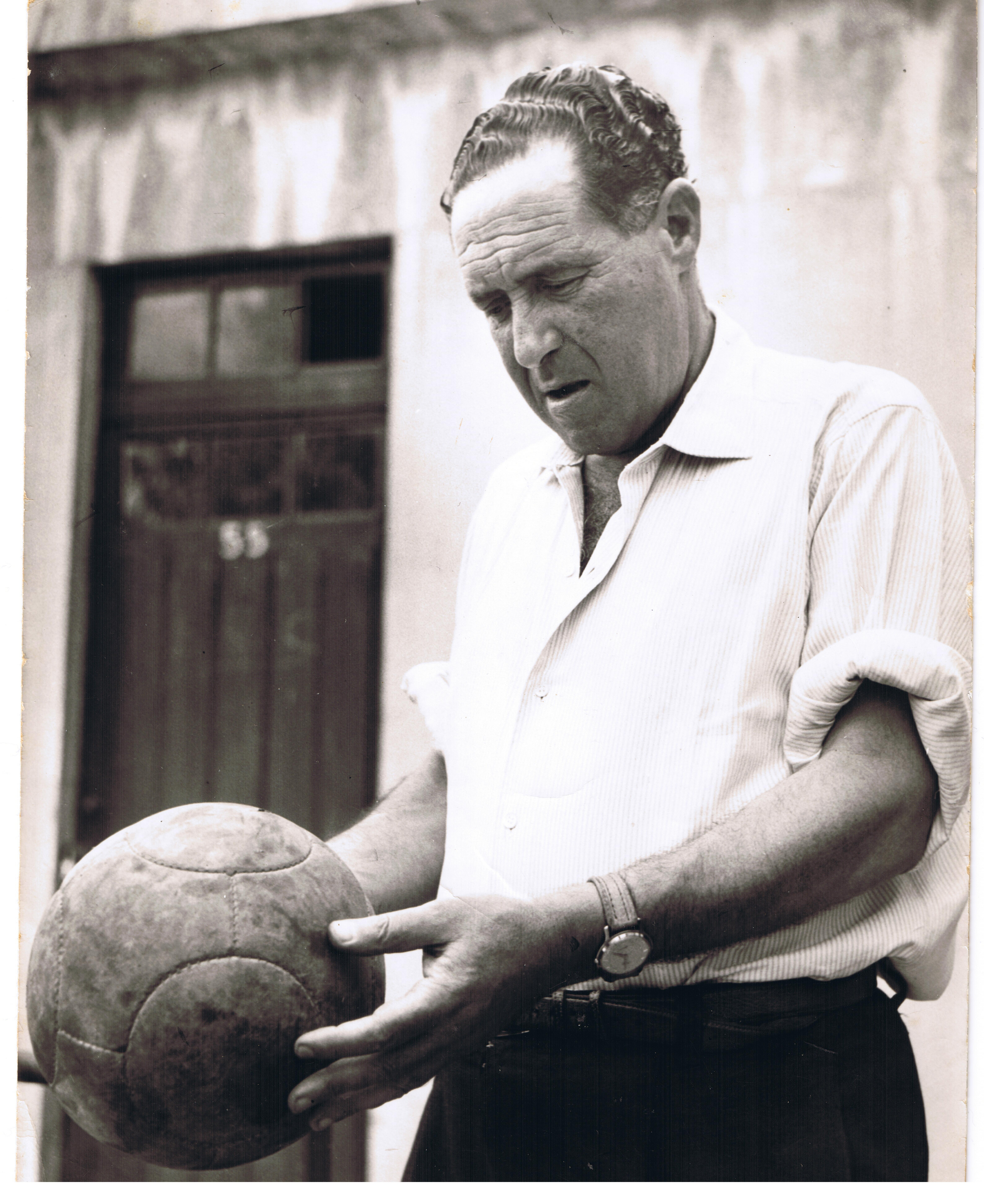

Personal information
- Full name: Santiago Urtizberea Oñatibia
- Date of birth: 25 July 1909
- Place of birth: Irun, Spain
- Date of death: 18 January 1985 (aged 75)
- Place of death: Irun, Spain
- Height: 1.76 m (5 ft 9 in)
- Position: Forward

Senior career*
Years	Team	Apps	(Gls)
1928–1932	Real Unión/Unión Irún	52	(48)
1932–1934	Donostia	19	(20)
1934–1936	Unión Irún	15	(7)
1936–1948	Girondins ASP		
Total		86+	(75+)

Managerial career
- 1943: Girondins ASP
- 1957: Bordeaux
- * Club domestic league appearances and goals

Santiago Urtizberea Oñatibia (25 July 1909 – 18 January 1985) was a Spanish football player and coach.

== Career ==
Born in Irun, Urtizberea played as a forward for Real Unión/Unión Irún and Donostia. After leaving Spain due to the Civil War, he moved to France and played for Girondins ASP, appearing in the 1941 and 1943 Coupe de France Final. He retired from playing in 1958, aged 39.

He later served as Bordeaux manager, and was manager of their amateur team from 1946 to 1963.

== Personal life ==
His brothers Claudio and Ricardo were also footballers.
