= 1941 Coupe de France final =

- Event: 1940–41 Coupe de France
Girondins ASP	Fives
2	0
- Date: 25 May 1941
- Venue: Stade Municipal, Saint-Ouen
- Referee: Léon Boes
- Attendance: 15,230

The 1941 Coupe de France final was a football match held at Stade Municipal, Saint-Ouen on 25 May 1941, that saw Girondins ASP defeat SC Fives 2–0 thanks to goals by Santiago Urtizberea.

== Match details ==
25 May 1941

Girondins ASP	2–0	Fives
Urtizberea 60', 84'

Stade Municipal, Saint-Ouen
Attendance: 15,230
Referee: Léon Boes

GK	(France) André Gérard
DF	(France) Michel Homar
DF	(Spain) Jaime Mancisidor (c)
DF	(France) Nordine Ben Ali
DF	(France) Joseph Plesiak
MF	(France) Emile Rummelhardt
MF	(Hungary) Ferenc Szücs "Szego"
FW	(France) Emmanuel Lopez
FW	(Spain) Santiago Urtizberea
FW	(France) Claude Pruvot
FW	(France) Henri Arnaudeau
Manager:
(Spain) Benito Díaz Assistant Referees: Fourth Official:

GK	(France) Tadeusz Juszczyk
DF	(France) Roger Pollet
DF	(France) Robert Gyselinck
DF	(France) André Trenelle
DF	(France) Joseph Jadrzejczak "Jadrejak"
MF	(France) François Bourbotte (c)
MF	(France) Marceau Sommerlynck
FW	(France) Albert Tancré
FW	(France) Norbert Van Caeneghem
FW	(France) Marius Dudziak
FW	(France) Edouard Wawrzeniak "Waggi"
Manager:
(England) George Berry

== See also ==
- 1940–41 Coupe de France
