= Henri Arnaudeau =

French footballer (1922–1987)

Personal information
- Full name: Henri Pierre Arnaudeau
- Date of birth: 23 April 1922
- Place of birth: Bordeaux, France
- Date of death: 23 October 1987 (aged 65)
- Place of death: Saint-Dizier, France
- Height: 1.78 m (5 ft 10 in)
- Position: Midfielder

Senior career*
Years	Team	Apps	(Gls)
1940–1948	Bordeaux	24	(2)
1943–1944	Bordeaux-Guyenne	325	(19)
1948–1950	Stade français-Red Star	19	(3)
1950–1951	Stade Français		
1951–1953	Racing de Paris		
1953–1954	Bordeaux		

International career
1942–1951	France	6	(1)
1954	France B	2	(0)
- * Club domestic league appearances and goals

Henri Pierre Arnaudeau (23 April 1922 – 23 October 1987) was a French footballer who played as a midfielder for Bordeaux and the France national team in 1940s. He was one of the best player in the club's history, winning the Coupe de France in 1941 and reaching the 1943 final, and being the top scorer of the 1947–48 French Division 2.

== Club career ==
Born on 23 April 1922 in Bordeaux, Arnaudeau began his football career at his hometown club Bordeaux in 1940, aged 18, remaining there for eight years, until 1948. In the first season at the club, he played a crucial role in helping the team win the Coupe de France in 1941, scoring six goals in six matches on their way to the title.

Together with Henri Baillot, Joop de Kubber, and André Doye, Arnaudeau was a member of the great Girondins team of the early 1940s that reached the finals of Coupe de France titles in 1941 and 1943; he started in both of them, beating Fives 2–0 in the former and losing to Olympique de Marseille 4–0 in the latter. In his last season at the club, he was the top scorer of the 1947–48 French Second Division with 28 goals scored, thus playing a decisive role in helping the team achieve promotion back to top-flight.

After leaving Girondins in 1948, Arnaudeau played for Stade français-Red Star (1948–50), Stade Français (1950–51), Racing de Paris (1951–53), after which he returned to Girondins for one more season (1953–54), where he retired in 1954, aged 32. In total, he scored 67 goals in 276 league matches. He was a very versatile player who was skillful in front of the goal.

== International career ==
On 8 March 1942, the 19-year-old Arnaudeau made his international debut in a friendly match against Switzerland in Marseille, which ended in a 0–2 loss. The following day, the journalists of the French newspaper L'Auto (the forerunner of L'Équipe) described his performance as "hesitant" and "lacking control", stating that he "played like a junior in front of proven senior players". In his third appearance for France, which was his last as a Girondins player, he assisted and then scored in first-half to help his side to a 3–1 win over Belgium.

Arnaudeau earned a further three caps for France in 1950 and 1951, now as a Stade Français player, and all in friendlies, helping his side to a draw and two victories.

== Death ==
Arnaudeau died in Saint-Dizier on 23 October 1987, at the age of 65.

== Honours ==
Girondins de Bordeaux

- Coupe de France: 1941; runner-up 1943
