= José Chávez Morado =

Mexican artist (1909-2002)

- Born: 4 January 1909; Silao, Guanajuato, Mexico
- Died: 1 December 2002 (aged 93); Guanajuato, Guanajuato, Mexico
- Education: Chouinard Art Institute, Academy of San Carlos
- Known for: Painting, sculpture, printmaking
- Notable work: El retorno de Quetzalcoatl; La conquista de la energía; El mundo azteca, La nacionalidad, El mundo maya, Mapas de transportes
- Movement: Mexican muralism, Escuela Mexicana de Pintura
- Awards: Premio Nacional de Artes; 1974

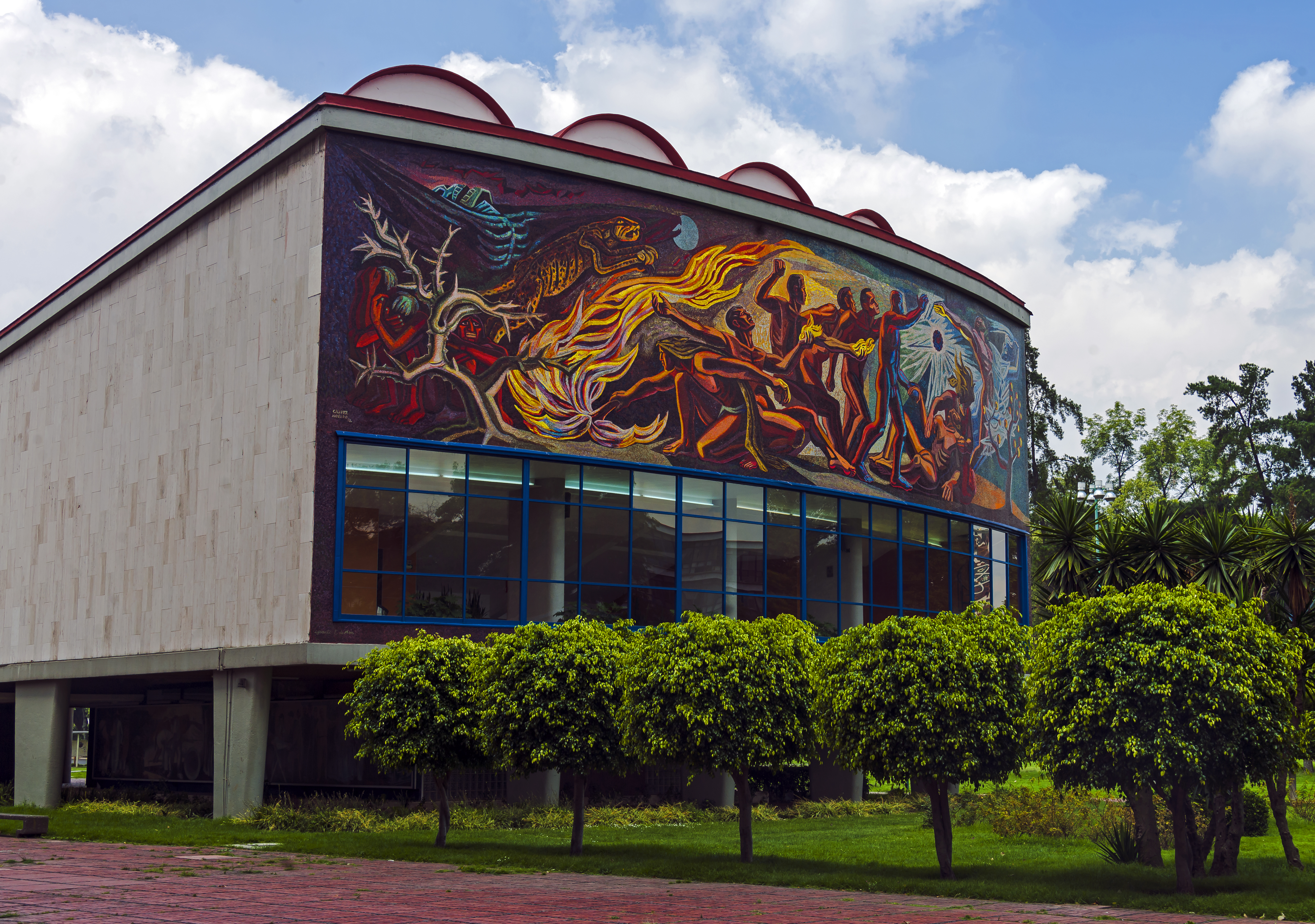
Mural The Conquest of Energy by José Chávez Morado at UNAM, Mexico City.

José Chávez Morado (Note: In this Mexican name, the surname is Chávez and the second or maternal family name is Morado.) (4 January 1909 – 1 December 2002) was a Mexican artist who was associated with the Mexican muralism movement of the 20th century. His generation followed that of Diego Rivera, José Clemente Orozco and David Alfaro Siqueiros. Although Chávez Morado took classes in California and Mexico, he is considered to be mostly self-taught. He experimented with various materials, and was an early user of Italian mosaic in monumental works. His major works include murals at the Ciudad Universitaria, Secretaría de Comunicaciones y Transportes and Museo Nacional de Antropología in Mexico City as well as frescos at the Alhóndiga de Granaditas in the city of Guanajuato that took twelve years to paint. From the 1940s on, he also worked as a cultural promoter, establishing a number of cultural institutions especially in his home state of Guanajuato including the Museo de Arte Olga Costa – José Chávez Morado, named after him and his wife, the artist Olga Costa.

== Life ==
Chávez Morado was born on 4 January 1909 in Silao, Guanajuato, shortly before the outbreak of the Mexican Revolution. His father was a merchant, José Ignacio Chávez Montes de Oca; his mother was Luz Morado Cabrera. He came from a modest family; however, his grandfather was in possession of a private library of over 5,000 volumes which had been collected by his grandparents and great grandparents. The illustrations in those books provided the child with his first exposure to art; when he was small, he spent time copying them, especially illustrations from La Ilustración Española.

His mother died when he was a teenager, and at age 16, he began to work at the Silao electrical company, Compañia de Luz. He lost this job when he drew a caricature of his boss. He then went to work at the national railway company, Ferrocarriles Nacionales de México, which allowed him to travel some of the Mexican countryside. In 1925 he emigrated to the United States, where he worked on citrus farms in California and even went to Alaska to work in salmon fishing on the island of Tonepek. During this time he still drew, mostly likenesses of his coworkers. He returned to California from Alaska, taking various jobs to be able to take classes at the Chouinard School of Arts. At this time he met José Clemente Orozco who was painting the mural "Prometeo" at Pomona College.

In 1930, he returned to Silao. His father gave him a store to run. At the counter, he would draw images of the customers and other typical people, which he sold when the store closed and he moved to Mexico City. He entered the Escuela Nacional de Bellas Artes (now the Escuela Nacional de Artes Plásticas, associating with the more politically active artists on the left.) He took engraving classes with Francisco de León, painting with Bulmaro Guzmán, and lithography with Emilio Amero. At the Centro Popular de Pintura "Saturnino Herrán" he met Leopoldo Méndez, whose posters he had taken from the streets to decorate his room.

He also met Olga Costa, who was born in Leipzig, Germany, the daughter of Russian émigré musician Jacob Kostakowsky. They married in 1935.

During his art career, Chávez Morado was politically active as a member of the Mexican Communist Party and with a number of communist and socialist artists' groups.

In 1949, he studied abroad in Europe and Cuba.

In his later life, he and his wife resided for a time in San Miguel de Allende, then moved permanently to the city of Guanajuato in 1966. They became avid collectors of Mexican handcrafts and folk art, archeological pieces, books and plants. They also sponsored numerous cultural events until his death. In 1975 they decided to donate their collection of pre-Hispanic art to the Museo Regional de la Alhóndga de Granaditas and their collection of colonial and folk art to the Museo del Pueblo in Guanajuato.

Chávez Morado died on 1 December 2002 at the age of 93 of respiratory failure. His funeral was at the Museo del Pueblo. At the time of his death, he was considered to be the "last of the Mexican muralists".

== Career ==
Chávez Morado was a painter, engraver, muralist and cultural promoter during his career. He also worked to support educational institutions in the state of Guanajuato.

He established his art career in the 1930s, starting by teaching drawing classes in primary and secondary schools in 1933. He was named chief of the Fine Arts Section of the Department of Fine Arts of the Secretaría de Educación Pública (SEP) in 1935, and later gave classes in drawing at the Escuela de Pintura y Escultura of the SEP in the 1940s. He also was a professor of lithography at the Escuela de Artes del Libro. His students included Felipe Ehrenberg, Luis Nishizawa and Greta Dale. He also did illustration work early in his career such as six linoleum engravings for the Vida nocturna de la Ciudad de México book by Ediciones de Arte Mexicano.

His main creations as an artist were murals. His first public work was La lucha antiimperialista! at the Teachers' College in Xalapa, Veracruz, in 1935. Other early murals include one for the Multifamiliar Doctores of the ISSSTE and the Teachers' College in Guadalajara, both of which were created with glass pieces. Starting in 1952, he created three murals at the Ciudad Universitaria in Mexico City called El regreso de Quetzalcóatl (The return of Quetzalcoatl), La conquista de la energía (The conquest of energy) and La ciencia y el trabajo (Science and work). All are in the Alfonso Caso Auditorium with the first two made of glass pieces. El retorno de Quetzalcoatl and La conquista de la energia are outside of the usual social and political themes of his work, but with La ciencia y el trabajo, he returned to examining social issues, this time in relation to the science building of the Ciudad Universitaria itself, which was designed by Mexico City architect Eugenio Peschard. It is not popular with those at the university but it is sought out by foreign tourists. It shows how the farm workers of the expropriated haciendas were used in the construction of the university as well as the architects and engineers who designed it, as well as the Van de Graaff generator which was a centerpiece of the university in the 1950s. This last work was created on the vestibule of the Auditorium with a vinyl substance. Its location has made this piece subject to damage from humidity and vandalism. In 1954 he created mosaic murals for the Secretaría de Comunicaciones y Transportes building, made of tile and colored stone. From 1955 to 1967 he painted fresco murals inside the Alhóndigas de Granaditas. This work was partially funded by a fundraising drive resulting in 250,000 Mexican schoolchildren donating twenty cents each. In 1964 he painted panels with Mesoamerican themes for the Museo Nacional de Antropología.

Chávez Morado's cultural promotions began in the 1940s. He founded and directed the Espiral Gallery and was a founding member of the Salón de la Plástica Mexicana. In 1948 he was a founding member of the Sociedad para el Impulso de las Artes Plásticas and two years later founded the Taller de Integración Plástica. In 1951, he designed scenery and costumes for the ballet performances called La manda and El sueño y la presencia. He established a number of museums in his home state of Guanajuato including the Alhóndigas de Granaditas Regional Museum, Casa del Arte José y Tomás Chávez Morado in Silao, the José Chávez Morado Library at the Instituto Nacional de Bellas Artes (donating his personal collection of art books) and the Museo de Arte Olga Costa – José Chávez Morado. The last is located at a farm which was part of a larger 17th century hacienda in a house where the couple had previously lived. Inaugurated in 1993, the museum´s ground floor contains the permanent collections which includes furniture, ceramics, glass, plaster of paris, altarpieces and masks. It includes an important collection of over 500 pre-Hispanic pieces, and over seventy pieces by Chávez Morado and Olga Costa.

During his career, Chávez Morado was involved in leftist politics, which influenced his art. In the 1930s, he joined the Liga de Escritores y Artistas Revolucionarios. The Liga edited a print album, Estampas del Golfo, which carried ten of his wood engravings. In 1937 he traveled as part of a committee of Mexican intellectuals which included Silvestre Revueltas, Juan de la Cabada, Octavio Paz, Carlos Pellicer, Elena Garro and José Mancisidor to Spain to support the Republicans. In 1938, he joined the Taller de Gráfica Popular, leaving in 1941. In 1941, he collaborated with La Voz de México, drawing cartoons under the pseudonym 'Juan Brochas'. He used the pseudonym 'Chon' to make illustrations for the weekly Combate headed by Narciso Bassols. In early 1942, he published four editions of a newspaper/poster called El Eje-Le, which was a publication of the Artistas Libres de México. In the 1940s, he was the general secretary of the Fine Arts Professors’ Union, which made non-commercial engravings with socialist messages to paste on poles outside. They had to do this activity at night as they were subject to attack by reactionaries such as the Camisas Doradas (Golden Shirts).

Later work included the reliefs on the column of the "umbrella" structure in the center of the Museo Nacional de Antropología in 1964, a monument to Benito Juárez on the Guadalajara–Colima highway in the 1970s, and the copper grilling on the façade of the new Legislative Palace in Mexico City.

His artistic legacy consists of over 2,000 works, including murals, other monumental works, etchings and paintings. His first exhibition was in 1944 at the Galería de Arte Mexicano. After that, his works were shown at the Instituto Nacional de Bellas Artes, the Instituto Nacional de Antropología e Historia and the Universidad Nacional Autónoma de Mexico as well as abroad. In 1976, he exhibited his drawing work for the first time at the José Clemente Orozco Gallery in the Zona Rosa, with the title of Apuntes de mi libreta, which were later published in a book of the same name. His works can be found in the collections of the Museo de Antropologia, UNAM, Centro Médico Nacional Siglo XXI, the Alhóndiga de Granaditas, Museo del Pueblo, the Olga Costa Chávez Morado Museum, Museo de los hermanos Tomás y José Chávez Morado and in private collections around the world.

He received his first recognition for his work in 1945 when he won first prize at a graphics competition sponsored by the Mexico City government for the 25th anniversary of the Mexican Revolution. In the 1950s, he began to receive accolades and appointments to art commissions. He received the National Prize for Arts and Sciences from the Mexican government in 1974. In 1985, he was admitted into the Academia de Artes and received an honorary doctorate from the Universidad Nacional Autónoma de México. He was also the vice president for Latin America of the World Crafts Council of UNESCO and a member emeritus of the Sistema Nacional de Creadores de Arte. His last homage while he was alive was at the Festival Internacional Cervantino. A retrospective of his work was hosted in Cádiz in 2012 on the 10th anniversary of his death.

== Artistry ==
Chávez Morado created engravings, illustrations, cartoon drawings, sculpture, murals, canvas painting, frescos, bronze, glass, and was one of the first Mexican artists to work with Italian mosaic on monumental works. Although he had some training in California and Mexico, he is considered to be mostly self-taught. He was interested in experimenting with new techniques and materials for murals. His work ranged from traditional frescos to those made with vinyl, mosaics, stone, bronze and terracotta.

His work was always figurative in the style of Mexican muralism also known as the Escuela Mexicana de Pintura. He is grouped with contemporaries such as Juan O'Gorman, Raúl Anguiano and Alfredo Zalce as the generation of the school to follow Diego Rivera, José Clemente Orozco and David Alfaro Siqueiros . Like the others, Chávez Morado promoted the social and political principles of the Mexican Revolution. He believed that art should be esthetic and political and was both politically active as well as an artist. His work emphasized faith in the masses, the exaltation of the struggle and heroes of the Mexican Revolution, popular culture and the railroad. His painting tended to emphasize the human form, with depictions of rural areas in Mexico, customs, dances and folk religion. By the mid 20th century, his politics and art became militant and communist, as can best be seen in his engravings and the work he did with the Taller de Gráfica Popular.
