= Nordine Ben Ali =

Algerian-French footballer and manager (1919-1996)

Personal information
- Full name: Nordine Ben Ali
- Date of birth: July 19, 1919
- Place of birth: Bologhine, French Algeria
- Date of death: May 15, 1996 (aged 76)
- Place of death: Lourdes, France
- Position: Midfielder

Senior career*
Years	Team	Apps	(Gls)
1938–1944	Girondins		
1944–1945	Le Mans	5	(0)
1945–1947	Stade Français	6	(0)
1947–1948	Le Havre		
1948–1949	Colmar	15	(1)
1949–1950	Strasbourg		
1950–1951	Monaco	18	(0)
1957–1960	Niort		

Managerial career
- 1957–1960: Niort
- 1961–1962: La Voulte
- 1966–1967: Dijon
- 1973–1975: Dijon
- * Club domestic league appearances and goals

Nordine Ben Ali (July 19, 1919 – May 15, 1996) was an Algerian-French association football player and manager.

== Biography ==
He played as a midfielder and was part of the Girondins ASP side that won the Coupe de France in 1941, as well as reaching the final of the Coupe de France in 1943. He was player-manager of Chamois Niortais for three seasons from 1957 until 1960. He also coached Dijon.

Ben Ali died Lourdes, France in May 1996 at the age of 76.
