= Georges Dard =

French footballer (1918–2001)

Personal information
- Full name: Georges Dard Fontaine
- Date of birth: 28 June 1918
- Place of birth: Marseille, France
- Date of death: 2 May 2001 (aged 82)
- Place of death: Marseille, France
- Position: Midfielder

Youth career
- 1930–1936: Marseille

Senior career*
Years	Team	Apps	(Gls)
1936–1948	Marseille	171	(64)
1937–1938	→ FC Sète (loan)		
1948–1949	Sevilla	10	(0)
1949–1954	Marseille	122	(24)
1954–1955	Gardanne		

International career
1947–1950	France	3	(2)

Managerial career
- 1954–1955: Gardanne
- * Club domestic league appearances and goals

Georges Dard (28 June 1918 – 2 May 2001) was a French footballer who played midfielder.

Dard was the son of a former Marseille president, Gabriel Dard. He began his football career with Marseille, helping the club win the 1943 Coupe de France Final and 1947–48 French Division 1 title. After a disagreement with club leadership, Dard joined Spain's Sevilla in October 1948, joining his brother, Roger, who was a striker for the club. One season later, he returned to Marseille where he would spend most of his remaining seasons.

Dard scored 65 Ligue 1 goals for Marseille, placing him in the all-time top ten.
