= Jaime Mancisidor =

Spanish footballer (1910–?)

Personal information
- Full name: Jaime Mancisidor Lasa
- Date of birth: 7 April 1910
- Place of birth: Irun, Spain
- Position: Defender

Senior career*
Years	Team	Apps	(Gls)
1928–1932	Real Unión	57	(0)
- Girondins ASP
1943–1944	Real Sociedad	17	(0)
Total		74	(0)
- * Club domestic league appearances and goals

Jaime Mancisidor Lasa (born 7 April 1910, date of death unknown) was a Spanish footballer who played as a defender.

== Career ==
Born in Irun, Mancisidor played for Real Unión and Real Sociedad. He also played for Girondins ASP in the 1941 Coupe de France Final.
