= Jean Bastien =

French footballer (1915-1969)

Personal information
- Date of birth: 21 June 1915
- Place of birth: Oran, French Algeria
- Date of death: 7 August 1969 (aged 54)
- Place of death: Marseille, France
- Position: Midfielder

Senior career*
Years	Team	Apps	(Gls)
1934–1935	SS Marsa (Oran)		
1935–1938	Marseille	80	(3)
1938–1939	RC Paris		
1939–1940	Marseille		
1940–1941	Toulouse		
1942–1950	Marseille	211	(6)
1950–1951	Montpellier		

International career
1938–1945	France	4	(0)

Managerial career
- 1950–1951: Montpellier
- * Club domestic league appearances and goals

Jean Bastien (21 June 1915 – 7 August 1969) was a professional French footballer. He was born in Oran, French Algeria, and died, aged 54, in Marseille.
