= Jean Robin (footballer) =

French footballer and manager (1921-2004)

Personal information
- Date of birth: 25 July 1921
- Place of birth: Marseille, France
- Date of death: 8 October 2004 (aged 83)
- Place of death: Marseille, France
- Position: Striker

Youth career
- 1931–1939: Marseille

Senior career*
Years	Team	Apps	(Gls)
1939–1943	Marseille	54	(13)
1943–1944	EF Marseille-Provence	17	(6)
1944–1953	Marseille	132	(47)
Total		203	(66)

Managerial career
- 1956–1958: Marseille
- 1963–1964: Marseille
- 1980: Marseille
- * Club domestic league appearances and goals

Jean Robin (25 July 1921 – 8 October 2004) was a French footballer and football manager.

== Playing career ==
He spent his entire career in hometown Marseille.

== Manager career ==
He coached Olympique de Marseille three times.
