= José Mancisidor =

Mexican writer, historian and politician

José Mancisidor Ortiz (Veracruz, Veracruz; April 20, 1894 – Monterrey, Nuevo León; August 22, 1956) was a Mexican writer, historian and politician.

== Biography ==
José Mancisidor Ortiz was born on April 20, 1894, in Veracruz, Veracruz, Mexico, the fifth of eleven children to Jorge Tomás Mancisidor Oyarzábal (1860–1921) and Catalina Ortiz Alpuche: Jorge, Rodolfo, Catalina, Esperanza, José, Anselmo, Carmela, Raimundo, María, Emilio and Francisco. He received his primary education from the "Francisco Javier Clavijero" School, and later went to learn a trade at the vocational school of the Secretariat of the Navy, located at the San Juan de Ulúa Fortress, until his third year reaching the rank of sergeant. In April 1914 he participated in the defense of the port of Veracruz against the occupation by the United States Marine Corps. He escaped to join the Constitutionalist Army of General Cándido Aguilar who incorporated him to the First Regiment of Artillery of the First Eastern Division with the rank of lieutenant. His military career continued till 1920, and participated in the Mexican Revolution within the Constitutionalist Army of Venustiano Carranza, reaching the rank of Lieutenant Colonel of Artillery and getting appointed Military Commander and Governor of the Quintana Roo territory. He married Dolores Varela in 1917 with whom he had five children: Orlando, Arnaldo, Kolda, Elvia and Yolanda. Between 1920 and 1922 he was municipal syndic of Xalapa. On December 8, 1923, he helped to organise the civil defense of the city against the de la Huerta uprising. From 1926 to 1929, he was local deputy for the Xalapa district. He supported the uprising of General Arnulfo R. Gómez in the state under the orders of General Miguel Alemán González; however, after the execution of Gómez in 1927 he accepted to amnesty offered by the government. One more time, in 1929, he joined the failed Escobar uprising led by General Jesús M. Aguirre, who adhered to General José Gonzalo Escobar, who previously fought against, defeated and executed General Arnulfo R. Gómez.

Left without political or military possibilities, José Mancisidor was appointed director of the Veracruz state government press by Governor Adalberto Tejeda, who had already distanced himself from the Jefe Máximo, the political chieftain, Plutarco Elías Calles. In 1932, Mancisidor became History Professor at the Veracruzan Normal School "Enrique C. Rébsamen", counting only with his primary education. In those years he collaborated with Simiente journal, he edited a journal titled Ruta, created his own publishing house called "Integrales", and published his first novels: La asonada (The Riot) and La ciudad roja (The Red City).

In April 1935 he traveled to New York City as the Mexican Delegate to the First American Writers Congress which eventually founded the League of American Writers. Fomented by Communists who hoped to nurture Proletarian literature the First Congress was presided over by Waldo Frank and was attended by important novelists, such as John Steinbeck, John Dos Passos and many others, who eventually abandoned the push for Marxist literature. Mancisidor remained faithful to the cause and published numerous works.

In June 1935, the governor of the state of Veracruz, Gonzalo Vázquez Vela, was appointed as Secretary of Public Education by President Lázaro Cárdenas, and included José Mancisidor within his team of associates that also included Luis Chávez Orozco, Rafael Ramos Pedrueza and Germán Lizt Arzubide, among others.

In 1936, he traveled to the Soviet Union where he met President Mikhail Kalinin, the Azerbaijani President Majid Afandiyev, among other politicians, and attended Maxim Gorky's funerals. When Manuel Ávila Camacho became president, changes were made within the Secretariat of Public Education, thus Mancisidor left his position and continued to teach history classes at the National Professors School, the National Normal School, the Secondary School for Young Women No. 8 and the Worker's University of Mexico. He died on August 22, 1956, after fainting while giving a conference at the Autonomous University of Nuevo León, in Monterrey.

== Works ==
=== Novels ===
- La asonada (1931)
- La ciudad roja (1932)
- Nueva York revolucionario (1935)
- De una madre española (1938)
- En la rosa de los vientos (1940)
- Frontera junto al mar (1953)
- El alba de las simas (1955)
- Nuestro petróleo (1956)
- Se llamaba Catalina (1958)
- Otra vez aquellos días, unfinished.
- La semilla del hombre, unfinished.
- Imágenes de mi tiempo, unfinished.

=== Short stories ===
- Cómo cayeron los héroes (1930)
- 120 días (1937)
- El juramento (1947)
- El destino (1947), honorary mention by the Republic of Cuba.
- La primera piedra (1950), containing La primera piedra, El regreso de Juan, El ojo siniestro e implacable, Un ladrón honrado, Mejor que perros, Los cuentos de abuelita, La culpa la tuvo el jefe, El tragalumbre, El mandato del espíritu, Crepúsculo, El tiras, El hombre que desintegró el átomo, ¡Terrible noche!, El juramento, Tierra y pan, El destino.
- Me lo dijo María Kaimlova (1955)

=== Essay ===
- Carranza y su política internacional (1929)
- Lenin (1934)
- Marx (1934)
- Romain Rolland (1935)
- Zola, soñador y hombre (1940)
- Hidalgo y la cuestión agraria (1944)
- Miguel Hidalgo, constructor de una patria (1944)
- Henri Barbusse, ingeniero de almas (1945)
- Stalin, el hombre de acero (1950)
- Balzac, el sentido humano de su obra (1952), awarded in Balzac's Centennial.
- El Huertismo (1953), in Historia mexicana 3 (1), July–August, pp. 34–51.
- Sobre literatura y filosofía (1956)
- Máximo Gorki, su filosofía y su religión (1956)
- El fin del porfiriato

=== Playwright ===
- Juárez, drama in three acts.
- Frontera junto al mar (1953)

=== Screenplays ===
- El joven Juárez (1955)
- Yanga
- Tres relatos
- El duelo
- Valentín Gómez Farías
- El camino de la libertad (1956), or Arriba Madero or Aquellos días
- El asesino
- El juramento
- El mundo de la infancia y adolescencia de Juárez
- El caso de Pascual Durán

=== History ===
- Síntesis histórica del movimiento social mexicano (1940)
- Historia de las luchas sociales en México
- Hidalgo, Morelos, Guerrero (1956), historic trilogy.
- Historia de la Revolución Mexicana (1958)

=== Anthologies ===
- Angulos de México (1940), selection of short stories.
- Antología de cuentistas mexicanos del siglo XIX (1946)
- Antología de cuentistas contemporáneos (1946)

=== Conferences ===
- Zola (1933)
