= Roger Scotti =

French footballer (1925–2001)

Personal information
- Date of birth: 29 July 1925
- Place of birth: Marseille, France
- Date of death: 12 December 2001 (aged 76)
- Place of death: Marseille, France
- Position: Midfielder

Senior career*
Years	Team	Apps	(Gls)
1942–1958	Marseille	403	(59)

International career
1950–1956	France	2	(0)
- * Club domestic league appearances and goals

Roger Scotti (29 July 1925 – 12 December 2001) was a French footballer who played as a midfielder.

== Career ==
Scotti spent his entire career with Olympique de Marseille. He also held the record for most games played under the Olympian colours: 453 matches and competitions in all. Until he was passed by Steve Mandanda in 2018.

He played his first match for the France national team on 1 November 1950 against Belgium, and his final game was on 7 October 1956 against Hungary.

He was noted as friendly and sportsmanlike.

== Honours ==
Marseille

- French Division 1: 1947–48
- Coupe de France: 1942–43

Individual

- Player having the most worn jersey in the Olympique de Marseille: 452 matches combined.
