= Emmanuel Aznar =

French footballer (1915–1970)

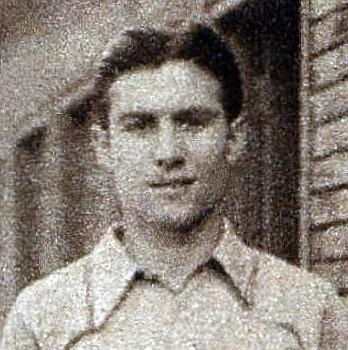
- Aznar in 1938

Personal information
- Date of birth: 23 December 1915
- Place of birth: Sidi Bel Abbès, French Algeria
- Date of death: 4 October 1970 (aged 54)
- Place of death: Marseille, France
- Height: 1.68 m (5 ft 6 in)
- Positions: Wing half; forward

Senior career*
Years	Team	Apps	(Gls)
1930–1936	SC Bel-Abbès	?	(?)
1936–1943	Marseille	114	(92)
1943–1944	EF Marseille-Provence	14	(4)
1944–1952	Marseille	40	(21)

International career
1938	France	1	(1)
- * Club domestic league appearances and goals

Emmanuel Aznar (23 December 1915 – 4 October 1970) was a French footballer.

== Career ==
Anzar, a left-footed wing half with a ferocious shot, played a total of 169 games and scored 118 goals for Olympique de Marseille. However this figure includes "war championship" (1939–1945) games which were mostly held in separate seasons for the occupied and "free" part of the country, and so are not considered official.

He won the Coupe de France with Marseille in 1938 and as captain in 1943, and the French championship in 1937 and 1948. On 22 May 1943, during the cup final against Bordeaux, Aznar scored a 31st-minute goal which made a hole in the netting (which he claimed was more a sign of the poor equipment available at that time, rather than the power of his shot).

On 4 October 1942, Aznar set an unofficial record by scoring 9 goals in one match against Avignon Foot 84 (Marseille won 20–2), despite being substituted in the 66th minute due to injury. He scored 8 goals in the first half, and is the only player to have scored nine goals in one match in professional French football history. That season he went on to finish as the league's top scorer with 45 goals in 30 league matches and a total of 56 goals in 38 matches including coupe de France games.

Manu, whose career like many others, was upset by the war, had also suffered from a lack of international recognition, playing just one friendly for France in a 6–1 defeat against Bulgaria on 24 March 1938.

After the war he became only a supplement player for Marseille, but contributed to the 1947–48 league campaign with 6 goals in only 8 matches, helping them to win the French championship again.

He died of a heart attack during a Marseille veterans football match at the age of 54 on 4 October 1970, twenty-eight years to the day after his memorable feat against Avignon. He was wearing the Marseille football shirt.

== Honours ==
Marseille

- Ligue 1: 1937, 1948
- Coupe de France: 1938, 1943
