= Joseph Gonzales (footballer) =

French footballer (1907–1984)

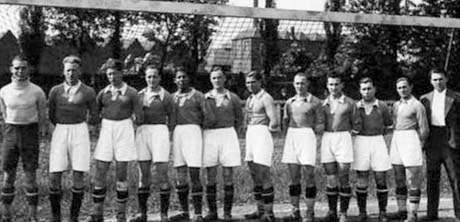
- SC Fives in 1934

Personal information
- Date of birth: 19 February 1907
- Place of birth: Béni Saf, French Algeria
- Date of death: 26 June 1984 (aged 77)
- Place of death: Aubagne, France
- Position: Defender

Senior career*
Years	Team	Apps	(Gls)
- JP Beni Saf
- ASPTT Oudja
1931–1933	Valenciennes		
1933–1936	SC Fives		
1936–1943	Marseille		
1943–1944	EF Marseille Provence		
1944–1946	Marseille		

International career
1936	France	1	(0)

Managerial career
- 1943: Marseille
- 1944: Marseille
- * Club domestic league appearances and goals

Joseph Gonzales (19 February 1907 in Béni Saf, French Algeria – 26 June 1984) was a French football player and manager. He won one international cap with the France national team, against Belgium in 1936, and was an unused squad member for the 1934 World Cup.

Gonzales played club football for Valenciennes, Fives and Marseille. He was also the manager of Marseille in 1943 and 1944.
