= Gaillard (disambiguation) =

Gaillard is a commune of the Haute-Savoie département of France.

Gaillard may also refer to:

== Places ==
- Château-Gaillard, Ain, a commune in the French département of Ain
- Château Gaillard, a ruined medieval castle in Normandy, France
- Gaillard Cut, old name for Culebra Cut, a man-made valley cutting through the continental divide in Panama
- Gaillard, Georgia, a community in the United States
- Gaillard Island, a dredge disposal island located in Alabama, United States
- La Gaillarde, a commune in Seine Maritime, France
- La Gaillarde campus, a campus in Montpellier, France
- Brive-la-Gaillarde, a commune in Corrèze, France

== People ==
=== Given name ===
- Gaillard I de Durfort (died 1356/7), French priest and nobleman
- Gaillard II de Durfort (died 1422), seneschal of Gascony
- Gaillard III de Durfort (died 1452), seneschal of Landes
- Gaillard IV de Durfort (died 1482), French nobleman
- Gaillard de Faugères (died 1317), archbishop of Arles
- Gaillard de Saumate (died 1323), archbishop of Arles
- Gaillard de Preyssac (died 1327), French cleric
- Gaillard de la Mothe (died 1356), French cardinal
- Gaillard du Puy (died 1361), bishop of Saintes
- Gaillard Spifame (died 1535), father of Gilles Spifame
- Jean-Baptiste Gaillard de Beaumanoir (died 1781), French baron, client of Pierre Macret
- Gailard Sartain (born 1946), American actor
- Gaillard Hunt (1862–1924), U.S. author and civil servant
- Theodore Gaillard Croft 1874–1920), U.S. army soldier and congressman from South Carolina
- Theodore Gaillard Hunt (1805–1893), U.S. Congressman
- Theodore Gaillard Thomas (1832–1903), U.S. gynaecologist

=== Surname ===
- Albert Gaillard (1858–1903), French mycologist
- Alizée Gaillard (also known as Alizée Sorel; born 1985), Swiss-Haitian fashion model
- Bob Gaillard (born 1940), American college basketball coach and businessman
- Carolina Gaillard (born 1981), Argentine politician
- Claude Gaillard (born 1944), French politician
- Claude Ferdinand Gaillard (1834–1887), French engraver and painter
- David du Bose Gaillard (1859–1913), American Army engineer who worked on the Panama Canal project
- Eddie Gaillard (born 1970), American baseball player
- Emmanuel Gaillard (1952–2021), French lawyer and arbitration specialist
- Félix Gaillard (1919–1970), French Prime Minister
- Françoise Gaillard (born 1936), French art and literary critic, philosopher, professor, and art curator
- Frédéric Gaillard (born 1989), French footballer
- Gabriel-Henri Gaillard (1726–1806), French historian
- Geneviève Gaillard (born 1947), French veterinarian and politician
- Greetje Gaillard (1926–2019), Dutch Olympic swimmer
- Jean-Marc Gaillard (born 1980), French cross country skier and Olympic competitor
- Jean-Michel Gaillard (1946–2005), French author, TV executive, and senior adviser at the Élysée Palace
- John Gaillard (1765–1826), American Senator from South Carolina
- John Palmer Gaillard Jr. (1920–2006), mayor of Charleston, South Carolina
- Karen Gaillard (born 2001), Swiss racing driver
- Lamont Gaillard (born 1996), American football player
- Marcel Gaillard (Belgian footballer) (1927–1976), Belgian footballer
- Marcel Gaillard (French footballer) (1923–2007), French footballer
- Martine Gaillard (born 1971), Canadian sports television personality
- Mary K. Gaillard (1939–2025), American theoretical physicist
- Micha Gaillard (died 2010), Haitian politician and university professor
- Ophélie Gaillard (born 1974), French cellist
- Patrick Gaillard (born 1952), French Formula One auto racer
- Perceval Gaillard (born 1983), French politician
- Pieter Johannes Gaillard (1907–1992), Dutch scientist, after whom the Peter Gaillard IBMS Founder's Award was named
- Rémi Gaillard (born 1975), French humorist and internet video uploader
- Roger Gaillard (disambiguation), several people
- Slim Gaillard (1916–1991), American Afro-Cuban jazz singer, songwriter, pianist, and guitarist
- Tacitus Gaillard (d. 1786), American colonist
- Virgile Gaillard (1877–?), French footballer
- William Gaillard, French UEFA football public relations executive
- Yann Gaillard (1936–2022), French politician

== Others ==
- Gaillard, a naval term for the forecastle on a sailing warship, sometimes the forecastle and quarterdeck together
- Gaillard (grape), French wine grape that is also known as Enfariné noir
- Gaillard blanc, another name for the French wine grape Clairette blanche

== See also ==
- Galliard (disambiguation)
- Gallardo (disambiguation)
- Gaylord (disambiguation)
- Gailliard, a surname
