= Gaillard de Durfort =

Gaillard de Durfort or Galhart de Durfort may refer to:

- Gaillard I de Durfort (died 1356/7), former priest
- Gaillard II de Durfort (died 1422), son of preceding, seneschal of Gascony
- Gaillard III de Durfort (died 1452), son of preceding, seneschal of Landes
- Gaillard IV de Durfort (died 1482)
