= Gallardo =

Gallardo is a Spanish derivation of the French name "Gaillard" and may refer to:

== People ==
Notable people with the surname include:

- Almudena Gallardo (born 1979), Spanish archer, Olympic competitor
- Ángel Gallardo (civil engineer) (1867–1934), Argentine entomologist and foreign minister
- Ángel Gallardo (golfer) (born 1943), Spanish golfer
- Antonio Gallardo Lucena, Venezuela-born American Episcopal bishop
- Carla Gallardo (born 1999), Spanish long-distance runner
- Carlos Gallardo (actor), Mexican actor, screenwriter, director, and producer
- Eva Gallardo (born 1973), Spanish mathematician
- Francisco Gallardo, Spanish football player
- Gervasio Gallardo, (born 1934), Spanish surrealist painter
- Gloria Gallardo (1938–2012), American activist and nun
- Gloria Gallardo (politician), Ecuadorian politician and journalist
- Gilberto Rincón Gallardo (1939–2008), Mexican politician, activist, and former presidential candidate
- Helio Gallardo, Chilean-Costa Rican philosopher and professor
- Jesús Gallardo (born 1994), Mexican footballer
- Joe Gallardo (born 1939), American jazz musician and composer
- José Francisco Gallardo Rodríguez (1946-2021), Mexican general
- José Miguel Gallardo (1897–1976), Puerto Rican professor and politician, acting governor of Puerto Rico 1940–1941
- Juan Gallardo (born c. 1948), Mexican businessman and financier
- Lino Gallardo (1773–1837), Venezuelan musician; involved in Venezuelan independence struggle
- Lugiani Gallardo (born 1991), Mexican footballer
- Marcelo Gallardo (born 1976), Argentine football manager and former player
- Matías de Gálvez y Gallardo (1725–1784), Spanish general, governor of Guatemala, viceroy of New Spain
- Miguel Gallardo (footballer) (born 1984), Mexican football player
- Miguel Gallardo (singer) (1950-2005), Spanish singer
- Miguel Ángel Félix Gallardo (1946–2026), Mexican drug lord
- Miriam Gallardo (born 1968), Peruvian volleyball player
- Nahuel Gallardo (born 1998), Argentine footballer
- Pedro Gallardo Barrena (born 1974), Spanish politician
- Ray Gallardo, film director and cinematographer
- Sergio Gallardo (born 1979), Spanish middle-distance runner
- Silvana Gallardo (1953-2012), American actress
- Steve Gallardo (born 1968), American Democratic politician
- Yovani Gallardo (born 1986), baseball player for the Texas Rangers
- Federick Gallardo (born 1986), Filipino footballer

== Places ==
- Los Gallardos, municipality of Almería province, Andalusia, Spain
- Dr. Ángel Gallardo Provincial Natural Sciences Museum, museum in Rosario, Argentina

== Other uses ==
- Lamborghini Gallardo, an Italian sports car
- 17897 Gallardo, a main-belt asteroid discovered on March 19, 1999 by LONEOS
- "Gallardo", a song on the compilation album Self Made Vol. 3
- "Gallardo (Runtown song)", 2014

== See also ==
- Gallardosaurus, a genus of pliosaurid plesiosaur from the Caribbean seaway
- Gallardon (disambiguation)
- Gaillard (disambiguation)
- Galhardo
