= Gaylord (surname) =

Gaylord is a surname of Norman French origin. Notable people with the surname include:

- Bill Gaylord (born 1967), British former alpine skier
- Charles Gaylord (1936–2009), American martial artist
- Chester Gaylord (1899–1984), American singer
- Edith Kinney Gaylord (1916–2001), American journalist and philanthropist
- Edward Gaylord (1919–2003), American businessman, owner of The Oklahoman and founder of the Gaylord Entertainment Company
- Edward K. Gaylord (1873–1974), American newspaper owner and publisher, founder of newspaper The Oklahoman
- Frank Gaylord (1925–2018), American sculptor
- Glenn Gaylord, American film and television director, producer, and screenwriter
- James M. Gaylord (1811–1874), American politician, U.S. Representative from Ohio (1851–1853)
- Jeff Gaylord (1958–2023), American professional wrestler
- Jim Gaylord (born 1974), American artist
- John Gaylord (1797–1874), American Mormon leader
- Joseph Gaylord, American political consultant
- Karen X. Gaylord (1921–2014), American actress and Miss Minnesota (1942)
- Levi B. Gaylord (1840–1900), American soldier who fought in the American Civil War
- Louise Olga Gaylord Dillingham (1885–1964) American civic leader in Hawaii
- Mitch Gaylord (born 1961), American gymnast
- Norman Gaylord (1923–2007), American industrial chemist and research scientist
- Reuben Gaylord (1812–1880), American missionary, recognized leader of the missionary pioneers in the Nebraska Territory
- Ronnie Gaylord (1930–2004), American singer, songwriter, pantomimer, comedian, and member of The Gaylords
- Scott Gaylord (born 1958), American NASCAR driver
- Winfield R. Gaylord (1870–1943), American politician, member of the Wisconsin State Senate (1909–1913)

== See also ==
- Gaylord (disambiguation)
- Gaylord (given name)
