= Lords, counts and dukes of Lorges =

French peerage

Dukedom of Lorges
- Arms of the Dukes of Lorges
- Creation date: 1706
- Created by: Louis XIV
- Peerage: Peerage of France
- First holder: Guy Nicolas de Durfort de Lorges
- Present holder: Guy de Durfort, 9th Duke of Lorges
- Heir apparent: Emmanuel de Durfort-Civrac
- Seat: Château de Juigné
- Former seats: Château de Quintin; Château de Lorge; Château de Randan

The land of Lorges, located in Lorges (Loir-et-Cher) in the Canton of La Beauce, was, under the Ancien régime, a seigneury then a county and a duchy, having belonged to the Montgomery family then to the House of Durfort.

== History ==
Lyonne de Lodes, heiress of Lorges, daughter of Guillaume de Lodes (d. 1464), Lord of Vez, and Huguette de Jaye, brought the lordship of Lorges-en-Beauce to her 1481 marriage to Robert de Montgomery. Their youngest son, Jacques, was given the right to continue the line of the new Lords of Lorges. He had Lorges erected as a châtelain in February 1551. Eventually, the Lordship passed to the Durfort family.

The barony of Quintin, in Brittany, was erected into a simple duchy by letters of creation of 1691, registered on 31 March and 12 October of the same year. The "transmutation" of the title of Duke of Quintin into that of Duke of Lorges, in Orléanais, took place by letters of 1706.

By letters patent of 25 March 1773, Adélaïde Philippine de Durfort de Lorges, as heiress of her branch, was allowed to pass on the Duchy of Lorges to her husband, Jean-Laurent de Durfort-Civrac (1746–1826).

The succession of Guy Louis de Durfort de Lorges gave rise to a trial which ended with a decree of the King dated 29 September 1778. Quintin, which ceased to be a duchy to become a barony again, remained with the Choiseul-Praslin, while the land of Lorges, located in Orléanais, and created into the Duchy of Lorges, was entrusted to the descendants of Adélaïde Philippine and Jean-Laurent.

Jean-Laurent de Durfort-Civrac was called to the House of Peers on 4 June 1814 (peer "for life"). He was made duke and hereditary peer on 31 August 1817.

== Lords of Lorges ==
- Lyonne de Lodes, 1st Lady of Lorges; she married Robert de Montgomery (d. 1486), Lord of Cormainville, in 1481.
- Jacques I de Montgomery (c. 1485–1562), son of the above, 2nd Lord of Lorges and Bourgbarré, (Note: The lordship of Bourgbarré was owned at the beginning of the 15th century by the La Bouëxière family before passing through Claude de la Bouëxière to her husband, Jacques I de Montgomery, Lord of Lorges, who entrusted its management to Antoine de La Bouëxière, Lord of Beauvais, relative of his late wife.) Captain of the King's bodyguards, Colonel of the French Infantry of Francis I; married Claude de La Bouexière, Lady of Ducey.
- Gabriel de Montgomery (c. 1530–1574), son of the above, Lord of Montgomery, 3rd Lord of Lorges, Lord of Ducey, Captain of the King's Bodyguards; married Isabeau de La Touche.
- Jacques II de Montgomery (c. 1554–1609), son of the above, 4th Lord of Lorges, Captain of the King's Bodyguards, sold the Lordship of Bourgbarré (as his father had already sold the manor of La Vairie to Antoine de la Bouëxière in 1570); he married Perronelle de Champagne de La Suze, Lady of Bazoges.
- Marguerite de Montgomery (1585–1606), daughter of the above, 5th Lady of Lorges; she married, in 1603, Jacques de Durfort, 1st Marquis of Duras (1609), Baron of Blanquefort, 1st Count of Rauzan (1625), State Councilor under Henry IV.
- Guy Aldonce de Durfort (1605–1665), son of the preceding, 2nd Marquis of Duras, 2nd Count of Rauzan, Lord of Lorges, Field Marshal, Captain of the King's Bodyguards; he married Elisabeth de La Tour d'Auvergne in 1619. Their eldest son, Marshal Jacques Henri de Durfort (1625–1704), became first Duke of Duras in c. 1668.

== Counts of Lorges ==
- Guy Aldonce de Durfort (1630–1702), member of the House of Durfort, third son of the above (and younger brother of the 1st Jacques Henri de Durfort), Count of Lorges, Baron of Quintin (acquired in 1681), created 1st Duke of Quintin (1691; often referred to as the Duke of Lorge), Marshal of France, Captain of the King's Bodyguards; he married Geneviève de Frémont d'Auneuil in 1676.
- Guy Nicolas de Durfort (1683–1758), son of the above, 2nd Duke of Quintin (1702), Count of Lorges (1702).

== Dukes of Lorges ==
=== 1st Creation (1706) ===
- Guy Nicolas de Durfort (1683–1758), 2nd Duke of Quintin (1702), Count then 1st Duke of Lorges ("transmutation" in 1706), Captain of the King's Bodyguards; he married Geneviève Chamillart in 1702
  - His eldest son renounced the succession: Guy Michel de Durfort de Lorges (1704–1773), Count of Randan (1740), Marshal of France.
- Guy Louis de Durfort (1714–1775), younger son of the above, 2nd Duke of Lorges, Lieutenant-General of the King's Armies (1748); married Marie Butault de Marsan in 1737
  - Guyonne Marguerite Philippine de Durfort-Lorge (1739–1806), lady-in-waiting to Maria Josepha of Saxony then Marie Antoinette; married in 1754 to Renaud César de Choiseul, Duke of Praslin.
  - Guy Augustin (1740–1754), who died young.
  - Adelaide Philippine (1744–1819), a lady-in-waiting to the Dauphine, then lady-in-waiting to the Countess of Artois (Maria Theresa of Savoy); married in 1762 to Jean-Laurent de Durfort-Civrac, 1st Duke of Lorges (2nd creation).
  - Guy Michel (1751–1753), who died young.

=== 2nd Creation (1776) ===
- Jean-Laurent de Durfort-Civrac (1746–1826), 1st Duke of Lorges, Minister of the Dauphin, Lieutenant-General, Peer of France (1814); married in 1762 to Adélaïde Philippine de Durfort.
- Guy Émeric Anne de Durfort-Civrac (1767–1837), son of the above, Duke of Civrac, (Note: A patent dated 3 February 1815 authorizes him to take the title of Duke of Civrac during his lifetime.) 2nd Duke of Lorges, Captain in the Royal-Piémont Cavalry regiment; married in 1801 to Anne de Jaucourt.
- Emeric Laurent Paul Guy de Durfort-Civrac (1802–1879), son of the above, 3rd Duke of Lorges; married in 1823 to Émilie Léonie (youngest daughter of Charles Louis Yves du Bouchet de Sourches, 6th Marquis of Sourches), Grand Provost of France).
  - Louis Anne Paul de Durfort-Civrac (1828–1872), married in 1858 to Adélaïde de Nicolaÿ.
    - Marie Louis Aymard Guy de Durfort-Civrac (1861–1912), 4th Duke of Lorges, see below.
    - Marie Louis Augustin Augustin de Durfort-Civrac (1838–1911), General Councilor of Loire-Inférieure; married in 1864 to Anne Eugénie de Montmorency-Luxembourg.
      - Marie Louis Pierre de Durfort-Civrac (1872–1943), Cavalry captain; married in 1901 to Marguerite de Montault.
        - Armand Marie Joseph Odet de Durfort-Civrac (1902–1996), 7th Duke of Lorges, see below.
- Marie Louis Aymard Guy de Durfort-Civrac (1861–1912), grandson of the above, 4th Duke of Lorges (1879–1912), married, on August 30, 1888in Paris, with Anne Marie Henriette (1865–1934), daughter of Henri Charles Anne Marie Timoléon of Cossé-Brissac (1822–1887), 11th Prince of Robech.
- Guy de Durfort-Civrac ( 1890–1915), son of the above, 5th Duke of Lorges ( 1912 - 1915 );
- Paul Louis Robert Marie de Durfort-Civrac (1891–1972), brother of the above, 6th Duke of Lorges; married (and divorced) to Hélène Burrus.
- Armand Marie Joseph Odet de Durfort-Civrac (1902–1996), cousin of the above, 7th Duke of Lorges, Mayor of Saint-Hilaire-de-Chaléons; married in 1926 to Colette Marie Alix Eugénie Le Clerc de Juigné (daughter of Jacques Le Clerc de Juigné, Marquis of Juigné).
- Jacques Henri de Durfort-Civrac (1928–2014), son of the above, 8th Duke of Lorges, Mayor of Juigné-sur-Sarthe; married in 1959 to Cécile du Temple de Rougemont (daughter of General Jean-Louis du Temple de Rougemont)
- Guy de Durfort-Civrac (born 1960), son of the above, 9th Duke of Lorges, Municipal councilor of Juigné-sur-Sarthe; married in 1992 to Carole d'Halluin
  - Emmanuel de Durfort-Civrac (b. 1994)
  - Joseph de Durfort-Civrac (b. 1997).

== Châteaux ==
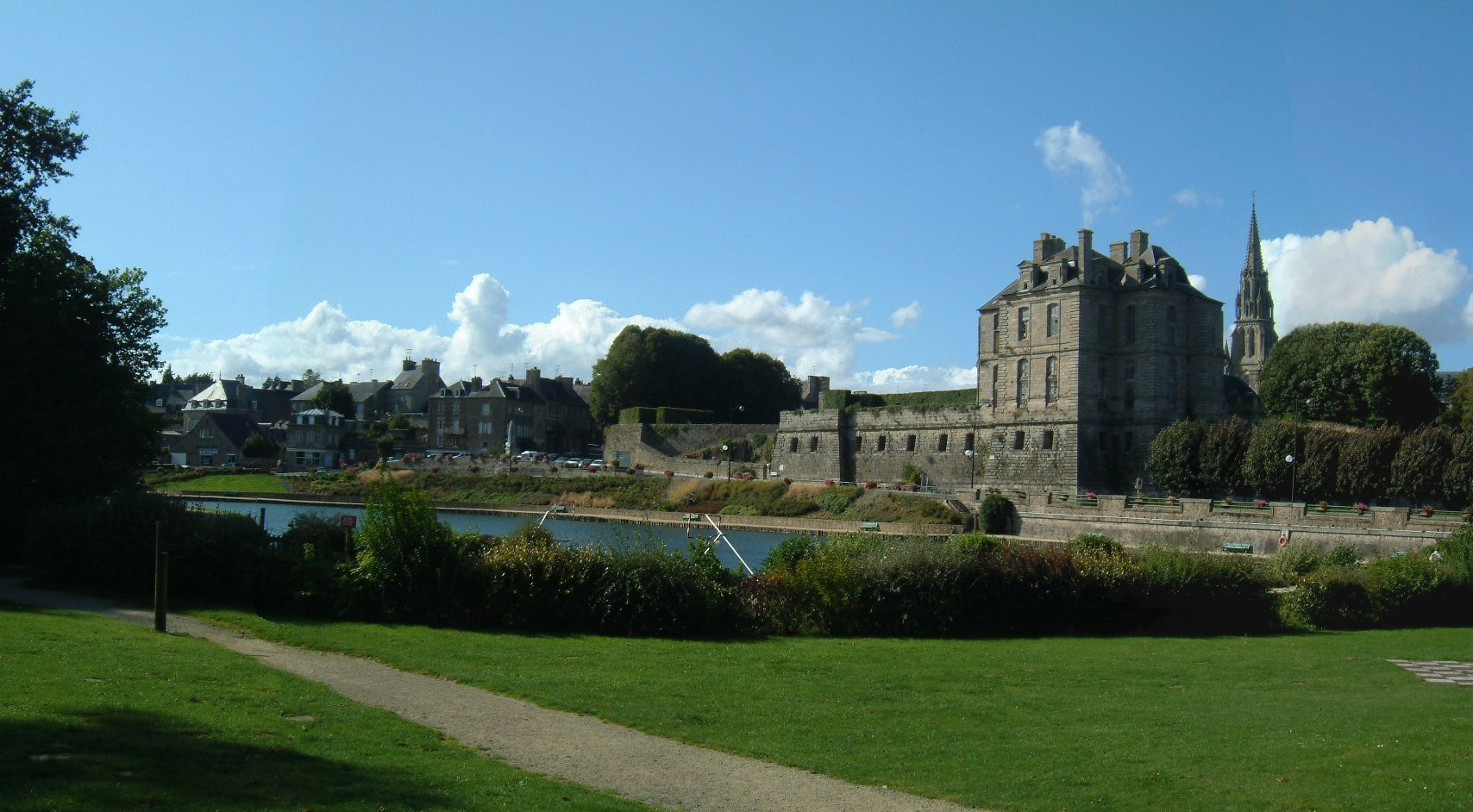
Château de Quintin

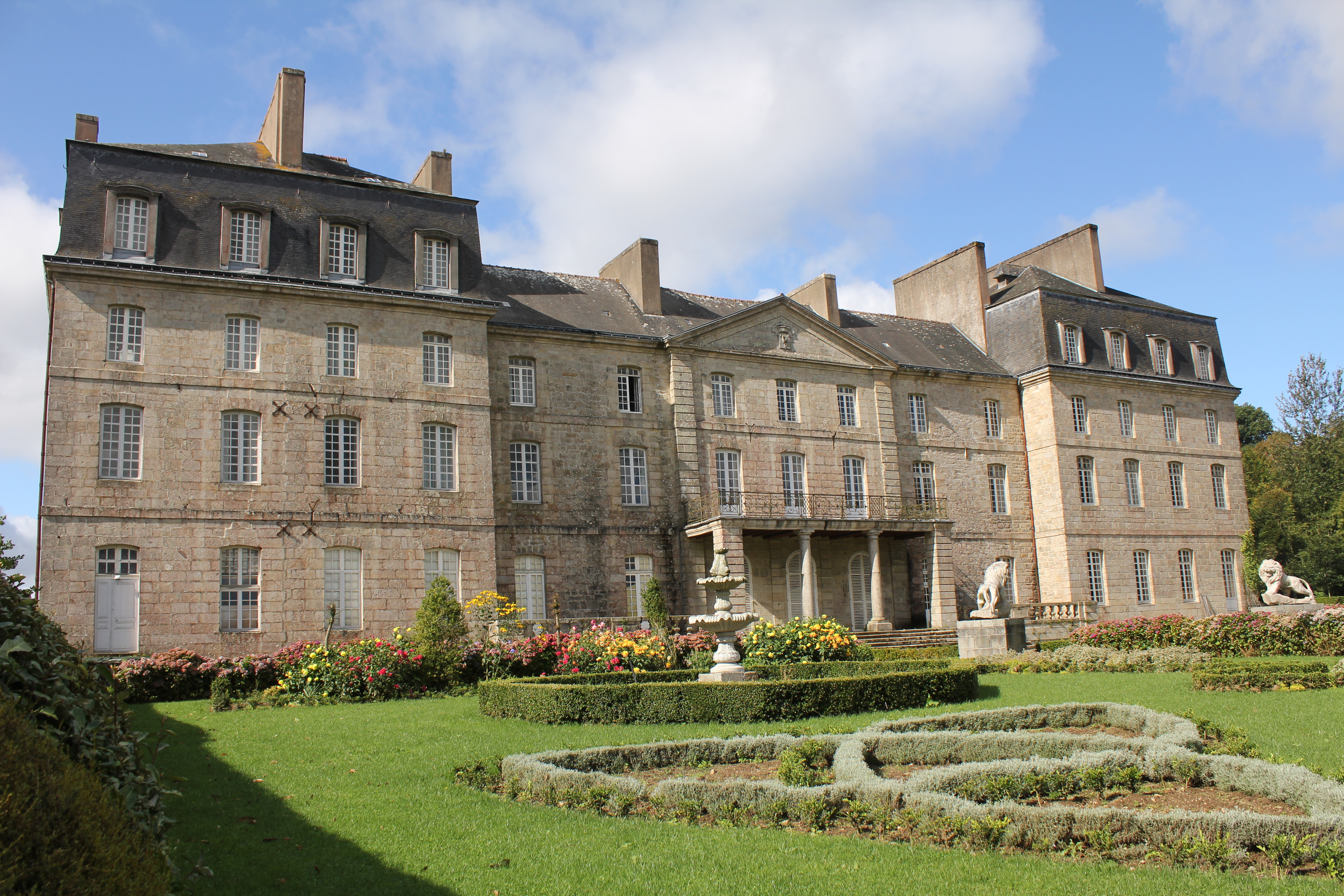
Château de Lorge

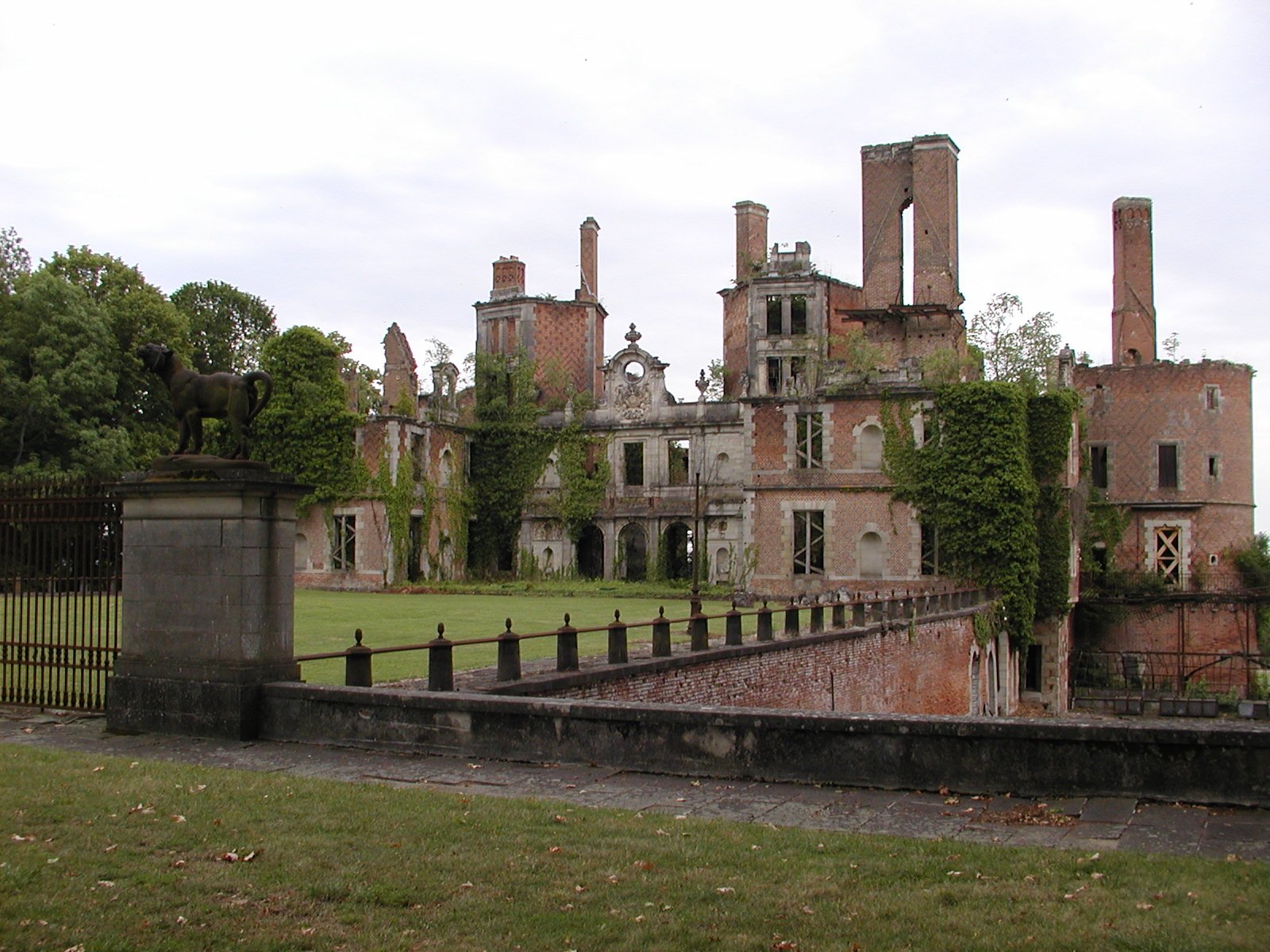
Château de Randan

== See also ==
- List of French dukedoms
