= Gaylord (given name) =

Gaylord is a given name of Norman French origin, transferred from the surname, ultimately from the Old French gaillard meaning "joyful" or "high-spirited". Notable people with the given name include:

== Arts and entertainment ==
=== Music ===
- Gaylord Birch (1946–1996), drummer for the bands Santana, Cold Blood, Pointer Sisters and Herbie Hancock
- Gaylord Carter (1905–2000), American organist and the composer of many film scores
- Gaylord Yost (1888–1958), violinist, composer and teacher

=== Writing ===
- Gaylord J. Clarke (1836–1870), American newspaper editor, lawyer, poet and politician
- Gaylord DuBois (1899–1993), American writer of comic book stories, comic strips, Big Little Books and juvenile adventure novels
- Gaylord Larsen (born 1932), American crime writer
- Gaylord Shaw (1942–2015), American journalist

=== Other arts and entertainment ===
- Gaylord Lloyd (1888–1943), American actor and assistant director, brother of Harold Lloyd
- Gaylord Schanilec (born 1955), American wood engraver and printer

== Government ==
- Gaylord Kent Conrad (born 1948), United States Senator from North Dakota from 1987 to 1992, and again from 1992 to 2013.
- Gaylord Graves (1804–1889), member of the Wisconsin State Assembly
- Gaylord Griswold (1767–1809), United States Representative from New York
- Gaylord Nelson (1916–2005), American politician from Wisconsin and the founder of Earth Day
- Gaylord T. Gunhus (1940–2016), retired American Army officer and 20th Chief of Chaplains of the United States Army

== Sports ==
- Gaylord Bryan (1927–2015), male long and triple jumper from the United States
- Gaylord Oubrier (born 1980), French gymnast
- Gaylord Perry (1938–2022), American Major League Baseball Hall of Fame right-handed pitcher
- Gaylord Powless (1946–2001), Mohawk lacrosse player
- Gaylord Silly (born 1986), French-Seychellois long-distance runner
- Gaylord Stinchcomb (1895–1973), American football player

== Other fields ==
- Gaylord Granville Bennett (bishop) (1882–1975), American bishop
- Gaylord Donnelley (1911–1992), owner and board member of R. R. Donnelley
- Gaylord Harnwell (1903–1982), American educator and physicist
- Gaylord K. Swim (1948–2005), American businessman
- Gaylord Starin White (1864–1931), American social reformer and activist
- Gaylord Wilshire (1861–1927), land developer, publisher and outspoken socialist

== Fictional characters ==
- Gaylord Buzzard, a character in the cartoon strip Broom-Hilda
- Gaylord the Camel, the mascot of the Campbell Fighting Camels and Lady Camels
- Gaylord Focker, a character in the movie Meet the Parents and its sequels
- Gaylord Justice, a character in the movie Smokey and the Bandit II
- Gaylord Ravenal, a character in Edna Ferber's novel Show Boat, and the musical play and movies based on it
- Frederick Gaylord Crane, a character in the television series Frasier
- Gaylord Robinson (noted Mr. Robinson), a character in the animated series The Amazing World of Gumball
- Gaylord, a character portrayed by English comic Dick Emery

== See also ==
- Gayelord Hauser (1895–1984), American nutritionist and self-help writer
- Gaylord (disambiguation)
- Galliard (disambiguation)
- Gaillard (disambiguation)
- Gaylord (surname)
