= Durfort family =

French noble family

Coat of arms of Dukes of Durfort-Duras

The Durfort family is an extant old French noble family, distinguished in French and English history. It originated as feudal lords of Durfort, Tarn, a village of south-western France. Today they still hold the title of Duke of Lorges. The current duke is Guy de Durfort-Civrac (born 1960).

== Middle Ages ==
Though earlier lords are known, the pedigree of the family is only clearly traceable to

- Arnaud de Durfort (fl. 1305), who acquired the fief of Duras by his marriage with a niece of Pope Clement V.
- Gaillard I de Durfort (died 1356/7), son of preceding
- Gaillard II de Durfort (died 1422), son of preceding, seneschal of Gascony
- Gaillard III de Durfort (died 1452), son of preceding, seneschal of Landes
- Gaillard IV de Durfort (died 1482)

== 17th century ==
The greatness of the family dates, however, from the 17th century.

- Jacques (1547–1626), 1st Marquis of Duras, married Marguerite de Montgomery (1585-1606), Lady of Lorges.
  - Guy Aldonce (1605–1665), 2nd Marquis of Duras and Count of Rauzan, had, by his wife Elizabeth de la Tour d'Auvergne, sister of Marshal Turenne, six sons, three of whom played a distinguished part.
    - Jacques Henri, the eldest son (1625–1704), was governor of Franche-Comté in 1674 and was created a marshal of France for his share in the conquest of that province (1675).
    - Guy Aldonce, the second son (1630–1702), Count of Lorges and Duke of Quintin (known as the Duke of Lorges), became a marshal of France in 1676, commanded the army in Germany from 1690 to 1695, and captured Heidelberg in 1693.
    - Louis, the sixth son (1640–1709), became Earl of Feversham under James II of England.

== 18th century ==
- Jean Baptiste (1684–1770), duc de Duras, son of Jacques Henri, was also a marshal of France. In 1733 he resigned the dukedom of Duras to his son, Emmanuel Felicité, himself receiving the brevet title of duc de Durfort.
- Guy Michel de Durfort (1704–1773), Duke of Lorges and Randan, marshal of France.
- Emmanuel Felicité (1715–1789), duc de Duras, took part in all the wars of Louis XV and was made a marshal of France in 1775.
- His grandson, Amedée Bretagne Maio (1771–1838), duc de Duras, is mainly known as the husband of Claire Louise Rose Bonne de Coetnempren de Kersaint (1778–1828), daughter of Armand Guy Simon de Coetnempren Kersaint, who, as duchesse de Duras, presided over a once celebrated salon and wrote several novels once widely read.

== Durfort-Civrac ==
The family of Durfort was later represented in France by the branch of Durfort-Civrac, dating from the 16th century.

- Jean Laurent (1746–1826), marquis de Civrac, married his cousin, the daughter of the duc de Lorges; his son,
- Guy Emeric Anne (1767–1837), duc de Civrac, became afterwards duc de Lorges.
- Henri, marquis de Durfort-Civrac (1812–1884), was a well-known politician, and was several times elected vice-president of the Chamber of Deputies.
