= Juan Manuel Olivares =

Venezuelan composer (1760–1797)

- Born: Juan Manuel Hermenegildo de la Luz Olivares; 4 April 1760; Caracas, Province of Venezuela, Spanish Empire
- Died: 1 March 1797 (aged 36); El Valle, Province of Caracas, Captaincy General of Venezuela, Spanish Empire
- Occupations: Composer; organist; music educator
- Years active: 1784–1797
- Spouse: Sebastiana Velásquez (m. 1789)

Juan Manuel Hermenegildo de la Luz Olivares (4 April 1760 – 1 March 1797) was a Venezuelan composer during the colonial era.

Olivares was born in Caracas. As a child, he studied under Don Ambrosio Carreño. In 1784, he began teaching in Caracas, and the same year, Pedro Ramón Palacios y Sojo entrusted to him the direction of the Academia del Oratorio de San Felipe de Neri, a position he held until his death; he also became organist for the academy's church, the Basílica de Santa Teresa.

On 11 May 1789, he married Sebastiana Velásquez in Caracas at the Church of San Pablo Ermitaño, which stood where the Municipal Theater now stands. Padre Sojo was the priest. Olivares was the caretaker and teacher of Lino Gallardo. He died in El Valle, Caracas.

His Dúo de violines is the only work of chamber music composed in colonial Venezuela which is preserved in its entirety.

== Incomplete list of works ==
- Lamentación primera del Viernes Santo (1791) – for tenor and orchestra
- Stabat Mater (1791) – for four voices and instrument
- Dúo de violines Salve Regina – for three voices and orchestra
- Magnificat – with final fugue
- Vísperas de Nuestra Señora de la Merced – motets for two voices
- Psalmes: Dixit Dominus, Beatus Vir, Laudate Dominum
