= James Gaylord =

James Gaylord may refer to:

- James M. Gaylord, American politician
- Jim Gaylord, American artist
