= Alixandre de Caumont =

French noble

Alixandre de Caumont (died 1357), also known as Anissant III de Caumont, Lord of Sainte Bazeille, was a 14th-century French noble.

== Biography ==
Caumont was the eldest son of Anissant II de Caumont, Lord of Sainte-Bazeille and Puch, and Isabelle de la Pébrée. Alixandre was involved in a disagreement with Helie-Rudel de Pons, Lord of Bragerac & Montignac, as to the inheritance of Marguerite de Turenne, his grandmother on his mother's side. In another dispute with Jourdain de Isle, who had torched one of Caumont's houses, with Jourdain having to pay the sum of three thousand livres to rebuild the house. In 1346, while acting in the service of King Edward III of England, Alixandre was in command of a large detachment of Gascons to reoccupy the French-held territory to the south and west of the Garonne in a mopping-up operation. As Caumont was following the English side in Gascony, Count Jean d'Armagnac laid siege to Chateau de Saint Bazeille and forced him to return to the service of the French king. Alexandre de Caumont shortly returned to the service of the English and was taken prisoner in the battle of Pont d'Aiguillon by Robert d'Angerrant. He died in 1357.

== Marriage and issue ==
Caumont married Blanche, daughter of Amanieu I, Lord of Langon, Roquetaillade and La Mothe-Roquetaillade and Blanche Soler. They are known to have had the following issue:

- Hélène de Caumont, married Bernard d'Albret, Lord of Gensac, had issue.
- Isabeau de Caumont
- Marguerite de Caumont, married Gaillard I de Durfort, Lord of Duras, had issue.
