= Marcel Gaillard =

Marcel Gaillard may refer to:

- Marcel Gaillard (Belgian footballer) (1927–1976), Belgian footballer who played in England for Tonbridge, Crystal Palace, Portsmouth and Weymouth
- Marcel Gaillard (French footballer) (1923–2007), French footballer who played in France for RC Strasbourg, OGC Nice and US Valenciennes-Anzin
