= Gaylord =

Gaylord is a name of Norman French origin, from the Old French gaillard meaning "joyful" or "high-spirited". It may refer to:

== People ==
- Gaylord (given name)
- Gaylord (surname)

== Businesses ==
- Gaylord Hotels, a hotel brand of Marriott International
- Gaylord (automobile), a former car manufacturing company
- Gaylord Container Corporation, a former U.S. paper manufacturer
  - Gaylord (container), a type of bulk box
- Gaylord Chemical Corporation, in the New Orleans suburb of Slidell, Louisiana, US
- Gaylord Entertainment Company

== Places ==
- Gaylord, Kansas
- Gaylord, Michigan
- Gaylord, Minnesota
- Gaylord, Oregon
- Gaylord, Virginia
- Gaylordsville, Connecticut
- Gaylord Entertainment Center, former name of Bridgestone Arena
- Gaylord Family Oklahoma Memorial Stadium, at the University of Oklahoma

== Music ==
- Dean Ford and the Gaylords, a 1960s Scottish beat group later known as the Marmalade
- The Gaylords (Dominican band), a popular Carnival band from 1966 to 1974
- The Gaylords (American vocal group), an American singing trio
- Gaylord (band), an American rock band from late 1990s–2010

== Other uses ==
- The Chicago Gaylords, a street gang
- Sir Gaylord, an American Thoroughbred racehorse who later became a successful sire

== See also ==
- Gaillard (disambiguation)
- Galliard (disambiguation)
- Gailard Sartain (born 1946), American actor and comic
- Gayelord Hauser (1895–1984), German-born nutritionist
