= Gailliard =

Gailliard is a surname. Notable people with the surname include:

- Amos M. Gailliard Jr. (1928–2014), United States Army officer
- James Gailliard (born 1965), American pastor and politician
- Louis Gailliard (1912–1996), French hurdler

== See also ==
- Gaillard (disambiguation)
- Galliard (disambiguation)
