= Jean-Pierre Latz =

Jean-Pierre Latz (c. 1691 – Paris, 4 August 1754 ) was one of the handful of truly outstanding cabinetmakers (ébénistes) working in Paris in the mid-18th century. Like several of his peers in the French capital, he was of German origin. His furniture is in a fully developed rococo style, employing boldly sculptural gilt-bronze mounts complementing marquetry motifs of flowers and leafy sprays, in figured tropical veneers like tulipwood, amarante, purpleheart and rosewood, often featuring the distinctive end-grain cuts. He also produced lacquered pieces, most famously the slant-front desk in the collection of Stavros Niarchos, Paris.

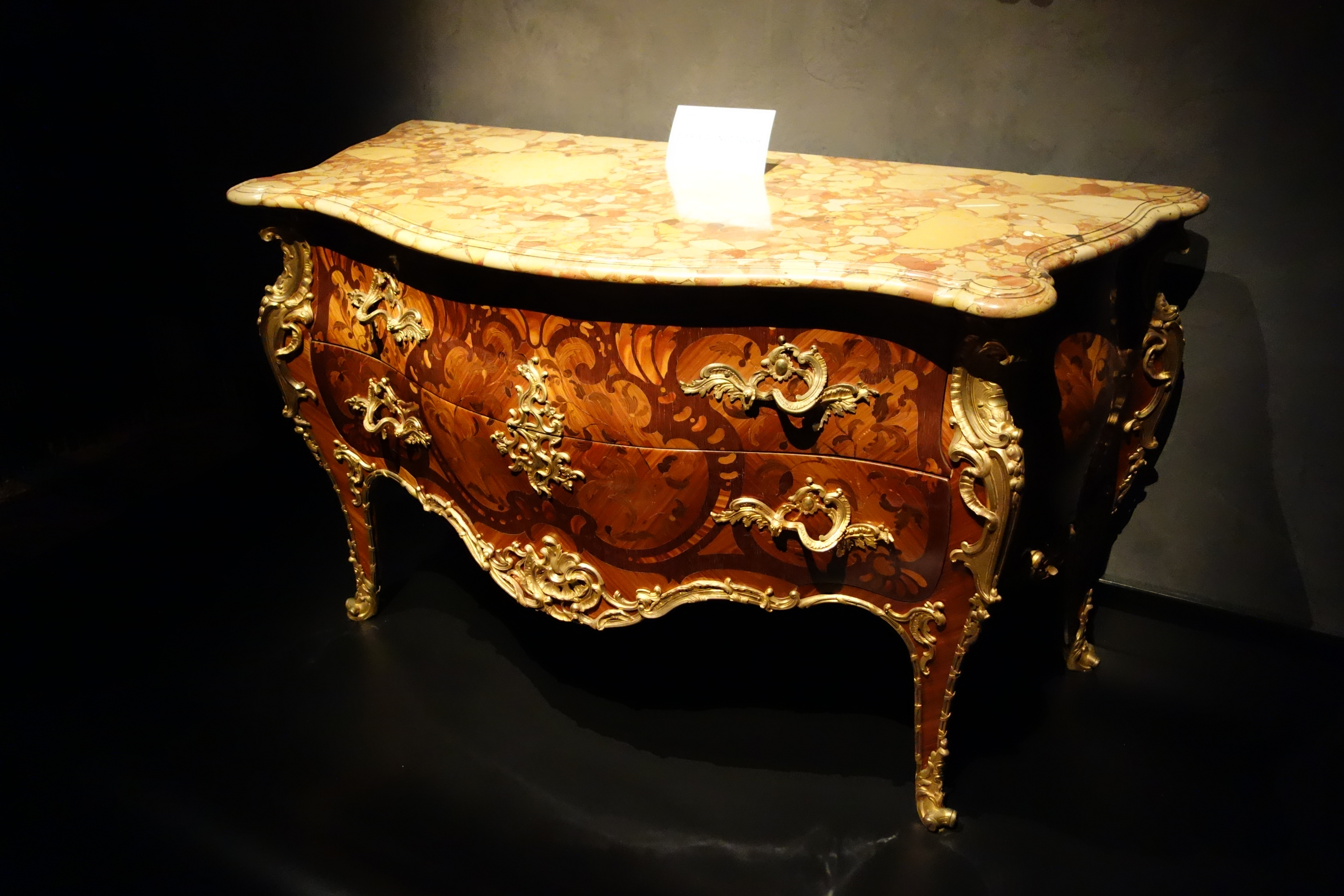
Commode by Jean-Pierre Latz, France, c. 1745, tulip wood, marqetry, breche d'Alep marble, Ormolu - Cincinnati Art Museum

The son of a certain Walter Latz, Jean-Pierre was born near Cologne, where he must have received his training, for when he settled in Paris in 1719, where he was received into the cabinetmakers' guild, he was aged twenty-six. He always retained a certain German weightiness to his designs. When the practice of stamping the carcasses of furniture was introduced in Paris, Latz was already in full career. Nevertheless, his style is individual enough that a range of unstamped case furniture, writing tables and especially clock cases, his specialty, with close stylistic connections to stamped pieces, can be attributed to his workshop. In some cases, carcases by Latz were veneered with marquetry in the shop of Jean-François Oeben, or, possibly, by Roger Vandercruse Lacroix.

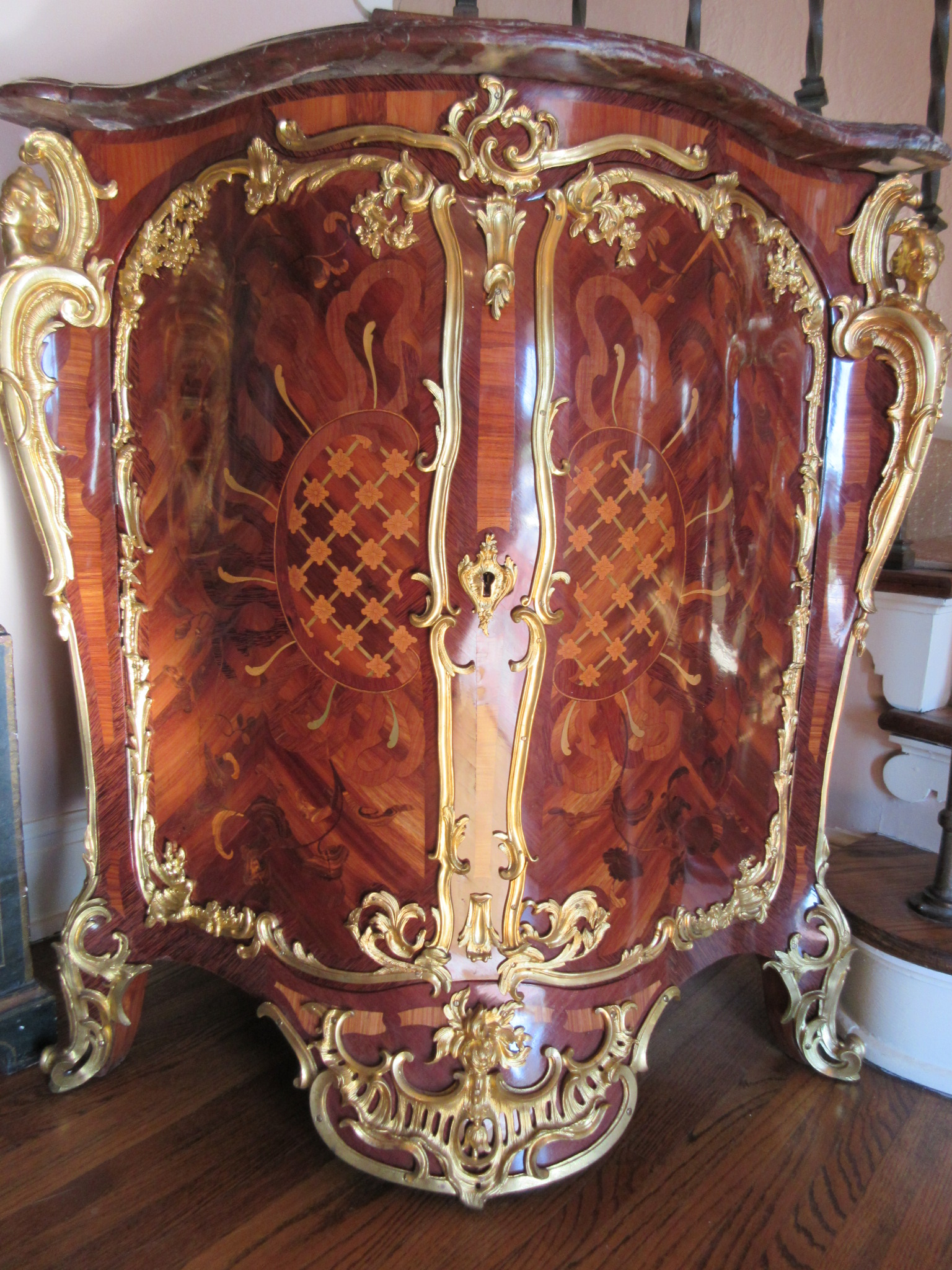
An encoignure by Latz, made circa 1750, is richly ornamented with marquetry and ormolu.

In May 1736 Latz was naturalized as a French citizen. In 1741 he was appointed ébéniste privilegié du Roi, a court appointment under royal warrant that should have freed him from certain Parisian guild restrictions. Robust and sculptural gilt-bronze mounts that show technical virtuosity in casting and the chasing of their surfaces are a consistent feature of Latz' identified work, and in this vein Henry Hawley has noted that he was investigated in December 1749 by the Paris guild of workers in metal (Communauté des fondeurs), for casting and chasing mounts in his own workshop, a privilege that was normally reserved to the metalworkers' guild. In spite of his warrant as ébéniste privilegié, all his bronze-chasing tools were confiscated and, what must have been an overwhelming loss, a thousand models for bronze mounts. Some of his furniture mounts can be dated 1745–49 by the tiny "crowned c" tax stamp they bear, that was in effect only during those years; an example is Latz' commode in the Cincinnati Art Museum.

Latz specialised in clock cases. In the documentation of the 1736 raid, 236 clock cases or parts of clock cases, including sculpted models for complete clocks, mounts and dial elements, and sculptural figures in bronze were impounded.

He counted numerous foreign clients, among them Frederick II of Prussia, for whom was conceived Latz's grandest piece, a richly mounted clock, Augustus III, Elector of Saxony and King of Poland, Count Heinrich von Brühl and Madame Elisabeth, Louis XV's favourite daughter, married to the Duke of Parma. At the time of his marriage in 1739, most unusually, the marriage contract was witnessed by two grand personages, Sister Marie-Gabrielle-Eléanor de Bourbon-Condé, abbess of the Abbaye Royale de Saint-Antoine, a princesse du Sang, and another abbess of a distinguished family, Jeanne de Rohan. Henry Hawley has suggested that such contacts would have provided a useful entrée at court.

After his death in 1754, his widow Marie-Madeleine continued the extensive workshops, holding his desirable brevet of marchand-ébéniste privilegié du roi suivant la cour; at her death two years later (7 December 1756), their only son having died as an infant, the shop was dispersed and the warrant passed to Pierre Macret. Latz' name, never mentioned in 18th-century Parisian sale catalogues, fell into complete obscurity after his death; his career was reconstructed in the 20th century, beginning with the comte de Salverte.
