= Guy Michel de Durfort, 2nd Duke of Lorges =

French general and nobleman

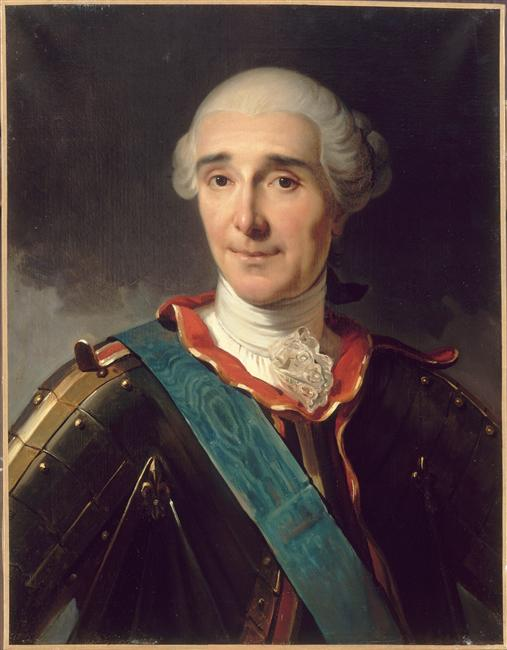
Guy Michel de Durfort

Guy Michel de Durfort, 2nd Duke of Lorges (26 August 1704 - 6 June 1773, Courbevoie) was a French general and nobleman. He was duke of Lorges and duke of Randan and was made a marshal of France in 1768.

== Biography ==
The eldest son of Guy Nicolas de Durfort de Lorges, duke of Quintin and of Lorges, and his wife Geneviève Thérèse Chamillart, Guy Michel joined the musketeers in 1719 and was put in command of a regiment in 1723. His father's dismissal in 1728 gained Guy Michel the titles of duke of Quintin and of Durfort.
In the same year, on 13 July, he married Élisabeth-Adélaïde de Poitiers de Riz (died 1778), only daughter of Ferdinand-Joseph de Poitiers de Rye d'Anglure, known as the count of Poitiers, and of Marie-Geneviève-Gertrude de Bourbon-Malause. The couple's only child was Marie-Geneviève (3 February 1734/35–10 December 1762, Paris) - in 1751 she married Jean Bretagne Charles de La Trémoille, duke of Thouars.

In 1733 Guy Michel inherited the dukedom and château of Randan from his aunt Geneviève-Marie de Durfort, duchess of Lauzun in 1733. He served in Italy in 1733 and 1734 under maréchal de Coigny and took part in the 1735 campaign on the banks of the Rhine as a brigadier. He was made a maréchal de camp in 1740 and put in command of Franche-Comté. He was attached to the armée de la Meuse in 1741 and 1742 and the armée du Rhin in 1744.

In 1745 he was made a lieutenant général and a knight of the Order of the Holy Spirit and that year fought in the army commanded on the banks of the Rhine by Louis-François de Bourbon. In 1746 he served under in Flanders under Louis XV himself. In 1752 he became a member of the Académie des sciences, belles-lettres et arts de Besançon et de Franche-Comté. He joined the French force campaigning in Germany in 1757 and 1758 and in 1768 he was appointed a marshal of France.

He died aged 69 without male issue and Guy Michel's younger brother Guy Louis inherited the dukedom of Randan.

== Bibliography ==
- Arnaud Bunel: Armorial illusté des Connétables et Maréchaux de France, Sibauldus 2005
- Charles Gavard, Galeries historiques du Palais de Versailles, vol. 7, Imprimerie nationale, 1842;
- Michel Popoff (preface by Hervé Pinoteau), Armorial de l'Ordre du Saint-Esprit : d'après l'œuvre du père Anselme et ses continuateurs, Paris, Le Léopard d'or, 1996, 204 p. (ISBN 2-86377-140-X);

Guy Michel de Durfort Born: 1704 Died: 1773
Preceded by Geneviève-Marie de Durfort	Duke of Randan; 1740-1773	Succeeded by Guy Louis de Durfort de Lorges
