= Joseph Gaylord =

American political consultant

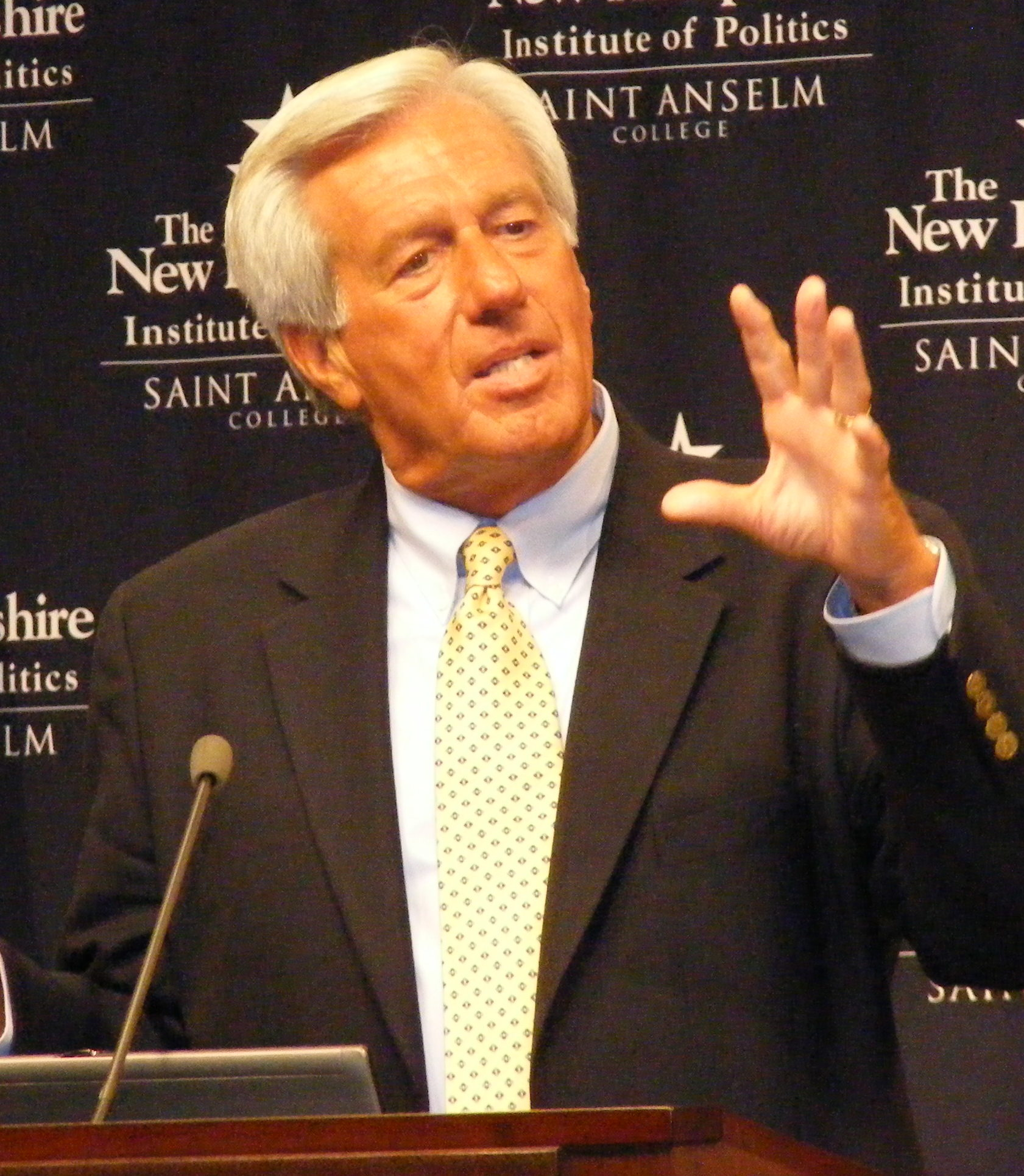
Gaylord in 2010

Joseph Gaylord is a political consultant formerly closely linked to former U.S. Representative and Speaker of the House Newt Gingrich. He was executive director of the National Republican Congressional Committee in the mid-1980s and worked for GOPAC, a political action committee which was "Gingrich's main vehicle for the long campaign that in 1994 resulted in the Republican takeover of the House after years of Democratic domination." Gaylord was one of the people behind the Contract With America that won the Republican Party control of the United States Congress in the 1994 midterm elections.

In the mid-1990s, Gingrich became the focus of ethics charges for his close association with GOPAC and other organizations; his use of Gaylord as a "top political lieutenant" despite the fact that Gaylord was, at the time, employed by GOPAC, was one of the things that got Gingrich in trouble, since House members and senators are prohibited from using funds received from a political committee to defray the costs of their congressional activities.

On December 7, 1995, the House Ethics Committee admonished Speaker Gingrich in a letter which read, in part:

In reference to the complaint filed by Representative George Miller on February 13, 1995, the Committee has found that your use of Mr. Joseph Gaylord was in violation of House Rule 45, which prohibits the use of unofficial resources for official purposes. Specifically the Committee found that Mr. Gaylord's activities during the transition of interviewing prospective staff violate our rules and that his regular, routine presence in congressional offices, while in and of itself not a violation of House rules, creates the appearance of the improper commingling of political and official resources. Such activities, if they are continuing, should cease immediately. The Committee will take no further action.

Gaylord is president of Chesapeake Associates, described on its website as "a full service professional campaign consulting firm based in Washington, DC." offering "Leadership Training, Campaign Consulting, Message and Media Consulting," and other services. He continues contributing to conservative political campaigns] and also works for Gingrich's 527 group, American Solutions. He was a Fellow at the Institute of Politics at Harvard Kennedy School in fall 2005.

Gaylord is working in association with the National Federation of Republican Women, teaching as a political consultant at the NFRW's Campaign Management Schools held all across the country.

In an apparent error, on September 9, 2009, Gaylord sent pornographic film producer Alison Vivas a letter on behalf of former Speaker Gingrich naming her "2009 Entrepreneur of the Year representing Arizona" and inviting Vivas to a private dinner with Gingrich to discuss policy. The invitation was subsequently retracted.

In September 2010 Gaylord forwarded a letter to physicians purporting that Speaker Gingrich had selected them as a 2010 "Champion of Medicine" with an invitation to an awards dinner to be held in Washington in November. This letter was a broadside aimed at all physicians, regardless of political persuasion and regardless of the fact that they might not have done anything meritorious in the past two years, as the letter suggests. It was a fundraising effort, masquerading as an award dinner offering an opportunity to hear Speaker Gingrich and be photographed with him.
