= Roger Gaillard (disambiguation) =

Roger Gaillard (1923–2000) was a Haitian historian and novelist

Roger Gaillard may also refer to:

- Roger Gaillard (actor) (1893–1970), French actor (The Threepenny Opera, La Chienne, Le Diable boiteux)
- Roger Gaillard (journalist) (1947–2010), Swiss writer, curator of museum Maison d'Ailleurs
- Roger Gaillard (politician) (1904–1947), Central Committee of the French Communist Party
