= Pierre Macret =

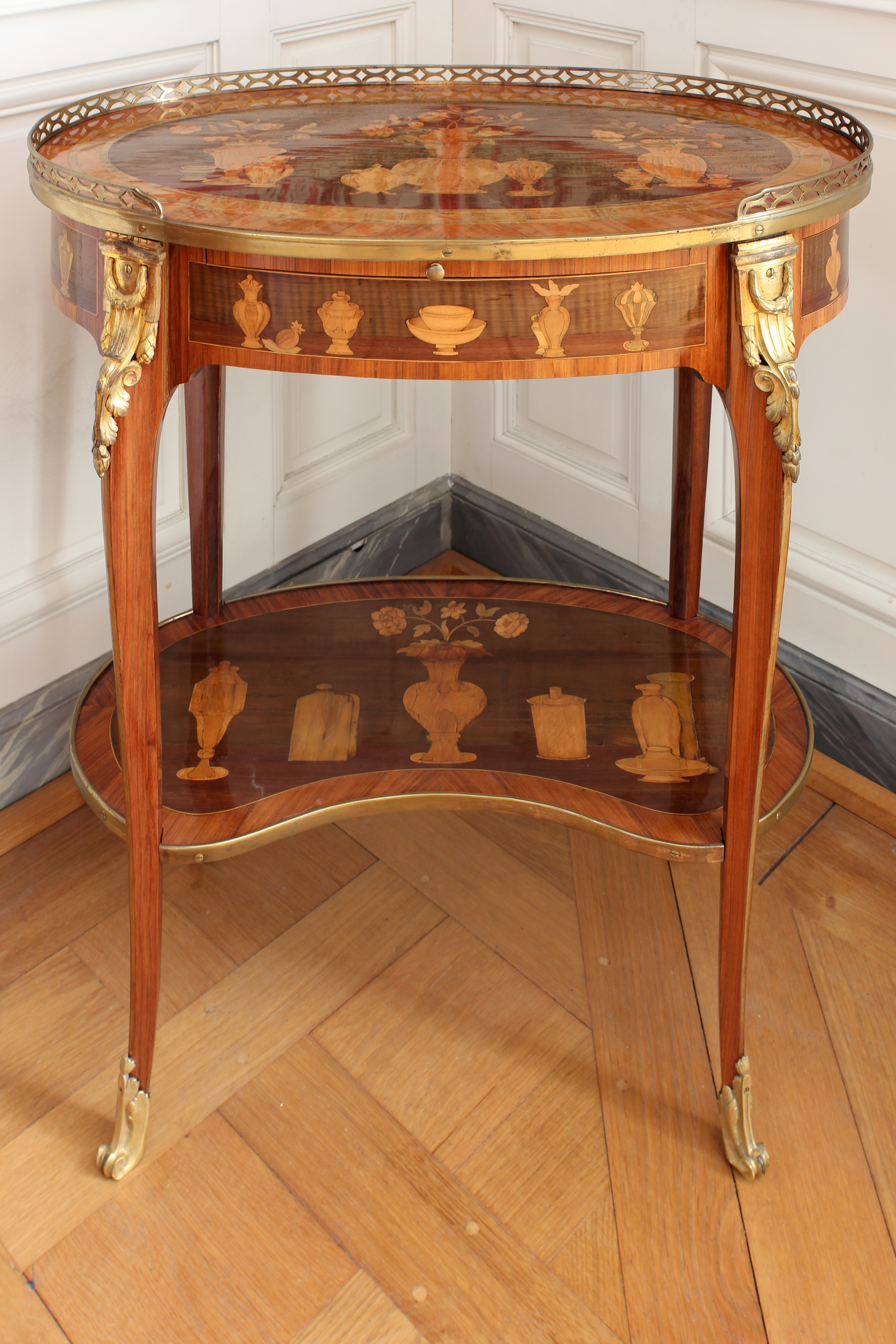
Small oval table volante by Macret and Charles Topino (Versailles)

Pierre Macret (1727–1806) was a well-known Parisian cabinetmaker (ébéniste). At the death of the widow of Jean-Pierre Latz in December 1756, he received Latz' court warrant as marchand-ébéniste privilégié du Roi suivant la Cour, ("royally privileged merchant-cabinetmaker following the court"), a brevet that exempted him from the stringent regulations of the Paris guild. In 1758 he was belatedly admitted maître-ébéniste by the guild, which henceforth required him to stamp his production. Numerous pieces bearing Macret's poinçon survive.

He retained premises in the fashionable rue Saint-Honoré near the church of Saint-Roch, across from the passage of the Académie de Musique. From 1765 to 1771 he provided furniture ordered by the Menus-Plaisirs: a commode of ca 1770 branded for the Garde-Meuble de la dauphine Marie-Antoinette, is now at Versailles. Macret also worked on occasion for the fashionable marchand-mercier Lazare Duvaux, for in the inventory compiled on Duvaux's death in 1758, Macret appears among the creditors: he was owed the considerable sum of 1169 livres.

Among his finest works is a slant-front writing-desk in Louis XV style, lacquered red with raised gilded figures in Chinese style, from the Forsythe Wickes collection now at Boston Museum of Fine Arts. On several commodes and corner cabinets (encoignures) dating from the 1760s he employed varnished sheet metal panels imitating Japanese or Chinese lacquer.

Macret married Jeanne Foulliėre en 1747. Though he retired from active practice in 1787, he was still alive in 1796.' L'acte de décès de Pierre Macret indique sa mort le 31 décembre 1806, rue Moreau à Paris paroisse des quinze- vingt.
