= Gaylord (automobile) =

American automobile manufacturer

The Gaylord was an American automobile manufactured in Gaylord, Michigan by the Gaylord Motor Car Company from 1911 to 1912. The vehicles were built in multiple styles, including a convertible four-seater private car and a utility vehicle with rear space for storage. It used a four-cylinder OHV engine of 30/35 hp and was shaft driven.

The only remaining Gaylord has been fully restored, and is owned by the Gaylord Chamber of Commerce. It is on display in the city's visitors' center.
