= Château de Puyguilhem (Thénac) =

Castle in Nouvelle-Aquitaine, France

Coordinates: 45.426°N 0.744°E

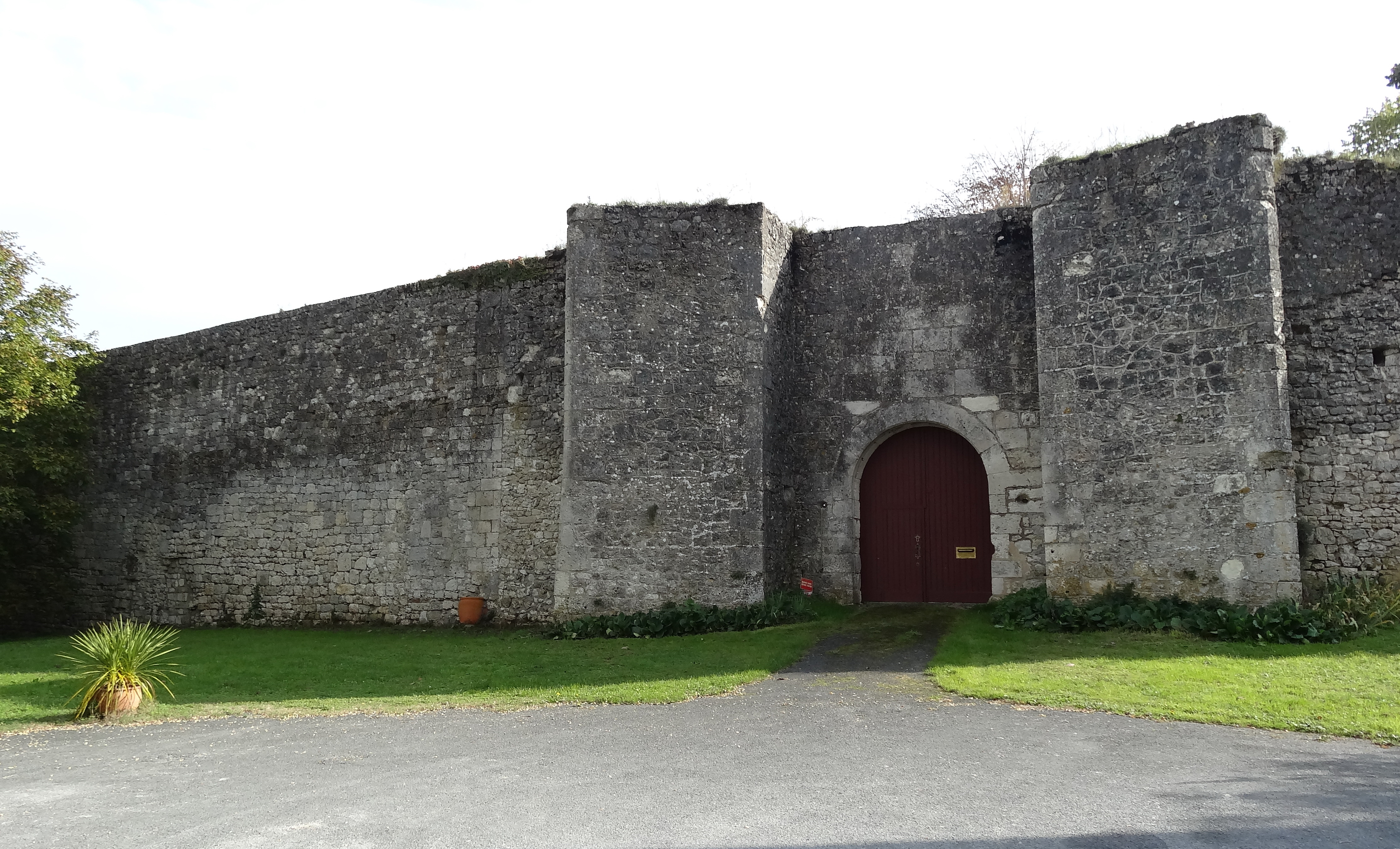
Château de Puyguilhem in 2003

Château de Puyguilhem is located in the town of Thénac, in the department of Dordogne, Nouvelle-Aquitaine, France.

The castle was captured in the 13th century by King Henry III of England. The castle was rebuilt by Bertrand de Panisseau after 1265.
