= Gaillard II de Durfort =

Gascon nobleman

Arms of Gaillard II de Durfort: Argent, a bend azure, impaling Gules a lion rampant argent.

Gaillard II de Durfort (died 1422), Lord of Duras, Blanquefort, and Villandraut, and Seneschal of Gascony, was a 13th-14th century Gascon nobleman of the Durfort family.

== Life ==
Durfort was the eldest son of Gaillard I de Durfort (died 1356) and Marguerite de Caumont. Gaillard was taken prisoner with Thomas Felton, the Seneschal of Gascony during a skirmish in 1377, near Eymet. Durfort was himself appointed Seneschal of Gascony and served between 1399 and 1415. Durfort died in 1422.

== Marriage and issue ==
Gaillard married Eléonore, daughter of Roger Bernard, Count of Périgord and Eléonore de Vendome and is known to have had the following issue:

- Gaillard III de Durfort, married Juliette de La Lande, had issue.

Durfort married secondly Jeanne de Lomagne, it is not known whether they had any issue.
