= Gaillard I de Durfort =

French priest and nobleman

Gaillard's coat of arms, shared with his brothers

Gaillard I de Durfort (Occitan: Galhart; fl. 1309–1356), known as the Archdeacon (l'Archidiacre), was a French priest and nobleman of the Durfort family. He inherited the Lacour–Durfort lands in 1345 and abandoned his clerical career to marry Marguerite de Caumont.

At first he took the English side in the Hundred Years' War. As a commander, he played a major role in the campaigns of 1345–46 in the Duchy of Gascony. In 1352 he changed sides, but in 1356 he returned to the English side.

== Early life and clerical career ==
Born towards 1299, Gaillard was a son of Arnaud (fl. 1306–21), lord of Clermont and Lacour, and Marquèse de Got. His brothers were Aimeric (fl. 1336–45), the eldest, lord of Duras; Bertrand (fl. 1322–60), lord of Gageac; and Raymond-Bernard (fl. 1345–66), lord of Fenouillet.

Gaillard was one of the most successful clerics of his age in accumulating benefices. Through the nepotism of his mother's uncle, Pope Clement V (1305–14), he received three priories and three canonries with their prebends, as well as the archdeaconries of Orléans and Tours, all before he was either of canonical age or had received holy orders. Clement supplied him with the necessary dispensations, as well as a dispensation from the obligation of residing in his benefices.

In his mature life, Gaillard was a professor of canon law at the University of Toulouse, where he had studied. He held prebends in Saintes, Agen and York and the archdeaconries of Périgueux, Aurillac and Outre-Loire in Angers. He was also the cantor of Cahors. His uncle, Raymond-Bernard, had served as bishop of Périgueux from 1314 to 1331. Gaillard and his brothers used an armorial seal that combined a lion rampant and a bend from two seals first used by their uncle.

Gaillard's income from his numerous clerical benefices amounted to some 3,000 livres tournois a year. Pope John XXII, in an effort to remedy the excesses of Clement V's pontificate, forced Gaillard to resign from the archdeaconry of Angers on 8 May 1318.

A single manuscript survives of Gaillard's legal teaching, titled "Reports given by the most excellent lord Gaillard of Durfort" (Latin Reportationes date per excellentissimum dominum Gualhardum de Duroforti). It contains lessons Gaillard apparently gave at Toulouse in 1337 or 1338 and was compiled either by Gaillard himself or by his students. Topics include the Decretals of Gregory IX and the Enchiridion of Sextus Pomponius.

== War against France ==
At the outbreak of war between England and France in 1337, his older brother Aimeric sided with the French. This cost Aimeric some lands in the Bordelais, which were confiscated by the English, but he retained his lands in the Agenais and the Périgord and he received from King Philip VI some estates confiscated from pro-English barons. Aimeric was probably killed at the battle of Auberoche in October 1345. His brother Bernard sided with the English and took part in the Earl of Derby's Bergerac campaign in August 1345.

In this situation in November 1345 Gaillard, who had only ever taken minor orders, abandoned the priesthood to become a knight, inherit his brother's lands and marry. Gaillard brought the fortresses of Puyguilhem and Duras to the English, as well as the allegiance of his remaining brothers and their followers. He became lord of Lacour, Duras, Blanquefort, Moissaguel and Villandraut. Gaillard made his formal submission to the Earl of Derby at La Réole on 13 November 1345 and in exchange he received back Blanquefort, which the English had seized, and a large cash subsidy.

During the Gascon campaign of 1345 and the siege of Aiguillon in 1346, Gaillard held the fortified town of Bajamont against the French. He launched several raids against the provincial capital of Agen, seat of the French. He also launched raids along the stretch of the river Garonne between Moissac and Aiguillon in order to cut off supplies to the besiegers. In response, the seneschal of the Agenais, Robert de Houdetot, laid siege to Bajamont with several hundred men. On 18 July 1346, the Duke of Normandy detached 2,000 of his men from the siege of Auguillon to help the seneschal surround Bajamont with earthworks. Before the project could begin, however, Gaillard ordered a sortie that dealt a serious defeat to the French and captured Houdetot.

Following the relief of the sieges of Aiguillon and Bajamont, the Earl of Derby led a chevauchée into French territory in early September 1346. He divided his army into three columns at La Réole and Gaillard took command of the column that raided the Agenais. Having secured the Agenais, Gaillard launched raids into Quercy, reaching as far as Cahors. He took 400 horsemen under his own command and in the last ten days of September raided north into the Corrèze, taking the market town of Tulle. This raid sparked panic in the province of Auvergne. News of the capture of Tulle reached Montferrand [80 miles (130 km) away] on 30 September and the town began immediately to prepare for an attack. The army of Count John of Armagnac was diverted to Tulle, which it besieged from mid-November until late December. The Gascon occupiers surrendered on terms and were taken prisoner, ultimately all were ransomed.

== Changes of allegiance ==
On 22 July 1348, Gaillard received from the English treasury the final payment owed him under the convention of November 1345. On 3 May 1352, with the French ascendant in Aquitaine, he switched allegiance, signing a convention with Carlos de la Cerda, constable of France, at Limoges. His brother Bertrand and his relative Bertrand de Goth, lord of Puyguilhem, were also signatories to this agreement, which was approved by King John II of France (formerly the Duke of Normandy) in February 1354. For his allegiance, Gaillard obtained a complete amnesty, the restitution of his lands occupied by French troops and a large subsidy to fund the defence of his castles and compensate him for lost revenues from those estates which he had or would lose to the English. The Caumont, the family of his wife, may have played a role in securing Gaillard's favourable terms.

Gaillard changed his allegiance again in 1356, following the great chevauchée of Edward the Black Prince in 1355. On 6 April he signed a convention with English similar in terms to the one he signed four years earlier with the French. It was ratified by Edward III at Westminster on 6 July 1358, although by that time Gaillard was dead.

Gaillard died between 4 April 1356 and 20 January 1357. He was not at the Battle of Poitiers in September 1356. He was succeeded in his lordships by his son by Marguerite, Gaillard II, who was a minor.
