= Françoise Gaillard =

French literary critic

Françoise Gaillard

Françoise Gaillard is a French literary critic, philosopher and professor at University of Paris VII specializing in fin-de-siècle French literature, aesthetics and art and is a regular visiting professor at New York University.

== Background ==
Françoise Gaillard is the author of various studies of French literature in its collective, political, and cultural framework. Gaillard is particularly interested in ideas of dogma and epistemology.

Gaillard has extensive proficiency in present-day artistic issues and is frequently a participant in debates and programs on French Culture. She has prepared a succession of debates on literature and philosophy at the Centre Georges Pompidou, collaborated for many years in the reviews La Quinzaine Littéraire and Canal (a magazine of contemporary art) and contributed to Le Monde des débats. She is a regular contributor to the seminars organized as Cerisy-la-Salle and serves on the editorial board of Romantisme, Etudes françaises, Esprit, Cahiers de médiologie, and Crises. She is a member of several research teams at the CNRS.

== Publications ==
- Diana Crash Éditions Descartes
- La Modernité en questions Editions du Cerf
- Littérature et médecine ou les pouvoirs du récit (co-auteur) Editions du Cerf
- La Modernité en questions - De Richard Rorty à Jürgen Habermas (co-auteur) Editions du Cerf
- Autoportrait sur fond de paysage americain MLN - Volume 119, Number 4, September 2004 (French Issue), pp. 637–643 The Johns Hopkins University Press

== See also ==
- Literary criticism
