= Gallardon (disambiguation) =

Gallardon may refer to:

- Alberto Ruiz-Gallardón
- Estadio Eduardo Gallardón
- Gallardon, France
