= Helio Gallardo =

Chilean philosopher

Helio Gallardo Martínez is a Chilean Philosopher and Professor of the University of Costa Rica. He moved to Costa Rica after Salvador Allende was overthrown.

== Books (in Spanish) ==
- Mitos e ideología en el proceso político chileno. Heredia: EUNA, 1979.
- Pensar en América Latina. Heredia: EUNA, 1981.
- Fundamentos de comprensión de lectura. San José: Nueva Década, 1982.
- Teoría y crisis en América Latina. San José: Nueva Década, 1984.
- Cultura, política, estado. San José: Nueva Década, 1985.
- Elementos de política en América Latina. San José: DEI, 1986.
- Fundamentos de formación política: análisis de coyuntura. San José: DEI, 1988.
- Actores y procesos políticos latinoamericanos. San José: DEI, 1989.
- Crisis del socialismo histórico: ideologías y desafíos. San José: DEI, 1991.
- Elementos de investigación académica San José: EUNED, 1992.
- 500 años: Fenomenología del mestizo (violencia y resistencia). San José: DEI, 1993 .
- Habitar la tierra. Bogotá, Colombia: Asamblea Pueblo de Dios, 1997. 112 pp.
- Vigencia y mito de Ernesto Ché Guevara. San José: Editorial de la Universidad de Costa Rica, 1997. 121 pp.
- El fundamento social de la esperanza. Quito: Escuela de Formación de Laicos y Laicas, Vicaría Sur de Quito, Ecuador, 1998.
- Castro/Pinochet. San José, Ediciones Perro Azul, 1999. 100 pp.
- Globalización, lucha social, derechos humanos. San José, Ediciones Perro Azul, 1999. 120 pp.
- (ed.), Pinochet procesado. San José, Ediciones Nueva Década, 1999. 216 pp.
- Abisa a los compañeros, pronto. San José, Ediciones Perro Azul, 2000. 94 pp. Segunda edición, 202 pp.
- Política y transformación social. Discusión sobre Derechos Humanos. Quito, Serpaj, 2000. 308pp.
- Adquisición de un automóvil. San José, Ediciones Perro Azul, 2001.
- Para subir al Jomalú. San José, Ediciones Perro Azul, 2002.
