= Gaillard, Georgia =

Unincorporated community in Georgia, U.S.

Coordinates: 32°38′37″N 84°00′19″W

Gaillard is an unincorporated community in Crawford County, in the U.S. state of Georgia.

== History ==
A post office called Gaillard was established in 1903, and remained in operation until 1951. The community was named after a local surveyor.

== Decline ==
Gaillard was a railroad community that died after the closure of the rail line.
