= Château de Quintin =

Castle in Côtes-d'Armor, Brittany, France

Coordinates: 48.4030°N 2.9087°W

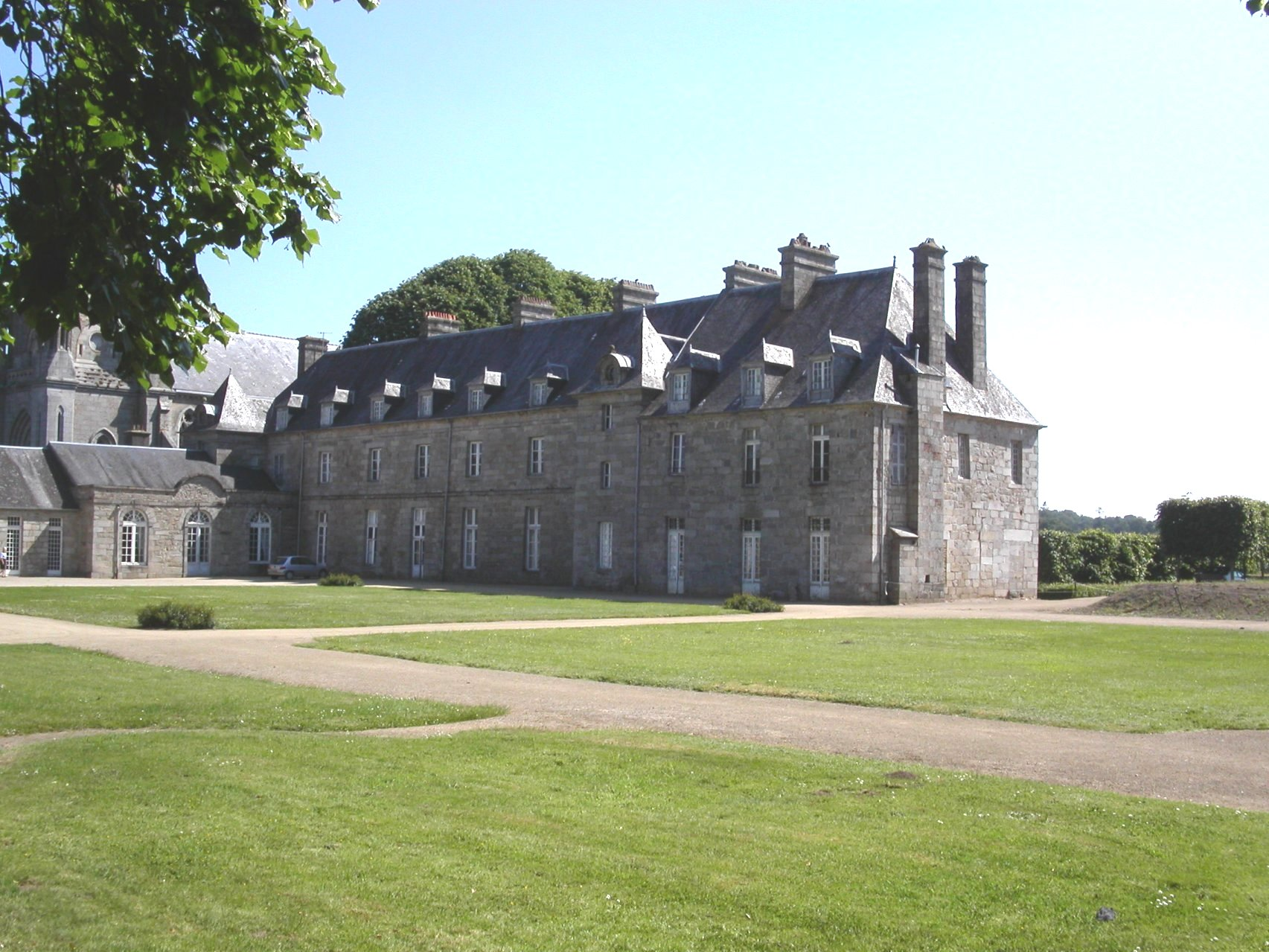
- Interactive map of the Château de Quintin area

The Château de Quintin is a castle in Quintin, Côtes-d'Armor, Brittany, France.

== History ==
The castle was partly built in 1775.

== Architectural significance ==
It has been listed as an official monument since 1983.
