= Gaillard III de Durfort =

Gascon nobleman

Gaillard's coat of arms

Gaillard III de Durfort (Note: Lewis and Vale combines him with his son, Gaillard IV, and thus numbers his father Gaillard III.) (Occitan: Galhart, Latin: Galhardus de Durefort; fl. 1414–1442) was a Gascon nobleman of the Durfort family. He inherited the lordship of Duras and Blanquefort from his father, Gaillard II, in 1422. In the Hundred Years' War between England and France, Gaillard took the side of the English king, who was the feudal suzerain of Gascony.

In 1423, King Henry VI of England appointed Gaillard prévôt of Bayonne, a charge he handed over to Guillaume Stone at the king's request in 1439. In 1434, he served as seneschal of the Landes for the English. In 1436, he signed a contract to fight as an ally (allié) of John I, Count of Foix, and his son, Gaston IV, themselves major supporters of Henry VI.

Gaillard married Indie de La Lande (Note: Her first name is also given as Indix or Judith. Her surname may be spelled de la Lande or de Lalande.) and had one son, Gaillard IV, who spent his childhood in London.

Gaillard III is last mentioned in a document of 1442 and he was dead by 1444.
