= Galliard (disambiguation) =

Galliard (Gaillarde in French; Gagliarda in Italian) is Renaissance dance and associated music.

Galliard may refer to:

== People ==
- Johann Ernst Galliard (1687–1749), German composer
- Léon Olphe-Galliard (1825–1893), French ornithologist
- Pierce Galliard Smith (1826–1908), Australian Baptist Church rector
- Christian Galliard de Lavernée (born 1950), French civil servant

== Other ==
- galliard (typography), another name for bourgeois-size type
- Galliard (typeface), typeface designed by Matthew Carter
- Galliard (horse), Thoroughbred racehorse

== See also ==
- Gaillard (disambiguation)
- Gallardo
- Gaylord (disambiguation)
