= Galhardo =

Galhardo is a surname. Notable people with the surname include:

- Rafael Galhardo (born 1991), Brazilian footballer
- Thiago Galhardo (born 1989), Brazilian footballer

== See also ==
- Fernando Galhardo Borges (born 1985), Brazilian footballer
