= Seneschal of the Landes =

The Seneschal of the Landes was an officer carrying out and managing the domestic affairs of the lord of the district of Landes, Bayonne and Labourd in the former Duchy of Gascony. Created in 1255, from a division of the position of Seneschal of Gascony, the seneschalship, also became an office of military command.

The seneschal managed the household, coordinating between the receivers of various landholdings and the chamber, treasury, and the chancellory or chapel. The seneschals of the Landes, like those appointed in Normandy, Poitou, and Gascony had custody of demesne fortresses, the regional treasuries, and presidency of the highest court of regional custom.

== List of Seneschals ==
- Raymond Duraunt (1326)
- Thomas de Hampton (1348)
- Matthew Gournay (1379–1406)
- John Tiptoft (1407)
