= Gaillard Island =

Island in Alabama, United States

Coordinates: 30.51°N 88.03°W

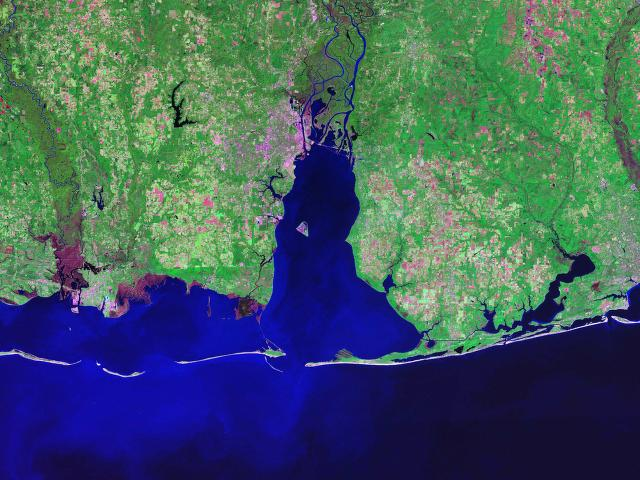
Landsat program photo of Mobile Bay. Gaillard Island is the triangle shaped piece of land near the center of the bay.

Gaillard Island is an artificially created island located in Mobile Bay near Mobile, Alabama. It was built by the United States Army Corps of Engineers, using sand and mud dredged from the Mobile Bay ship channel and elsewhere. The island is an important site for colonial nesting seabirds and shore birds in coastal Alabama and has been the only nesting site for brown pelicans (Pelecanus occidentalis) in Alabama—first discovered in 1983.

== Geography ==
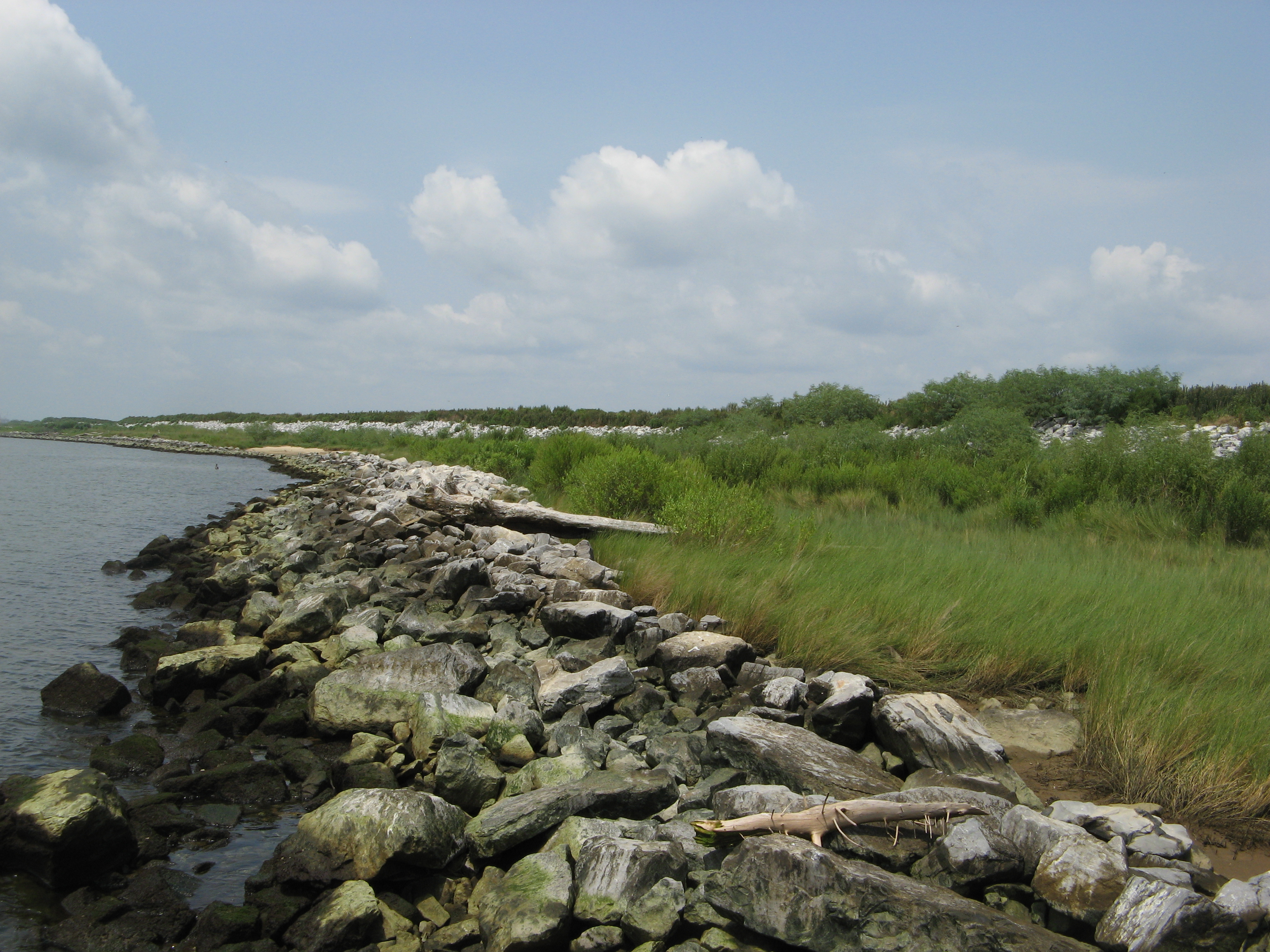
Shoreline of Gaillard Island

The island is 1,300 acres (5.3 km^{2}) and is configured in a triangular shape. It is located approximately 3 miles (4.8 km) east of Theodore Industrial Park Complex and approximately 11 miles (18 km) to 12 miles (19 km) southeast of downtown Mobile, Alabama. Thirty-one million cubic yards of dredged material pulled from the bay and nearby land was used to form the island. The excavated material consisted primarily of hard red clay from the land and silty sand infused with small amounts of shell and gravel from the bottom of the bay.

The dredged material was transported by barge and hydraulically pumped to the island site to make the dikes. Tests were performed by the Corps of Engineers to determine how to maintain the island and not allow it to dissipate into the bay. A triangular shape was designed and floating tire breakwaters were used to protect the island from erosion due to wave action. Marsh plants were used to develop an established root system to assist with long term integrity of the island. This was a state-of-the-art technique which has been widely studied, found to be effective and is now used nationwide.

== History ==
In 1979 Gaillard Island was created as a disposal island for a ship channel made to connect Mobile Bay and Theodore Industrial Park where a navy port was built. The project consisted of dredging a deep draft ship channel about 5.2 miles (8.4 km) long, 300 ft (91 m) wide and 40 ft (12 m) deep. The project was controversial from an engineering and environmental standpoint. The engineers thought the island would not hold up in an open body of water and the environmentalists were concerned about the impact on the bay from an ecological standpoint. The island has been a success from the onset and has become an environmental showcase, home to thousands of birds, particularly brown pelicans.

The island is named after Dr. M. Wilson Gaillard, a Mobile dentist. He was also an environmentalist who envisioned the island as a nesting haven for both shore and seabirds. The island is also known as Pelican Island by locals. The island is owned by the Alabama State Docks and managed by the U.S. Army Corps of Engineers, the Alabama Department of Conservation and Natural Resources, and the U.S. Fish and Wildlife Service.

== Ecosystem ==
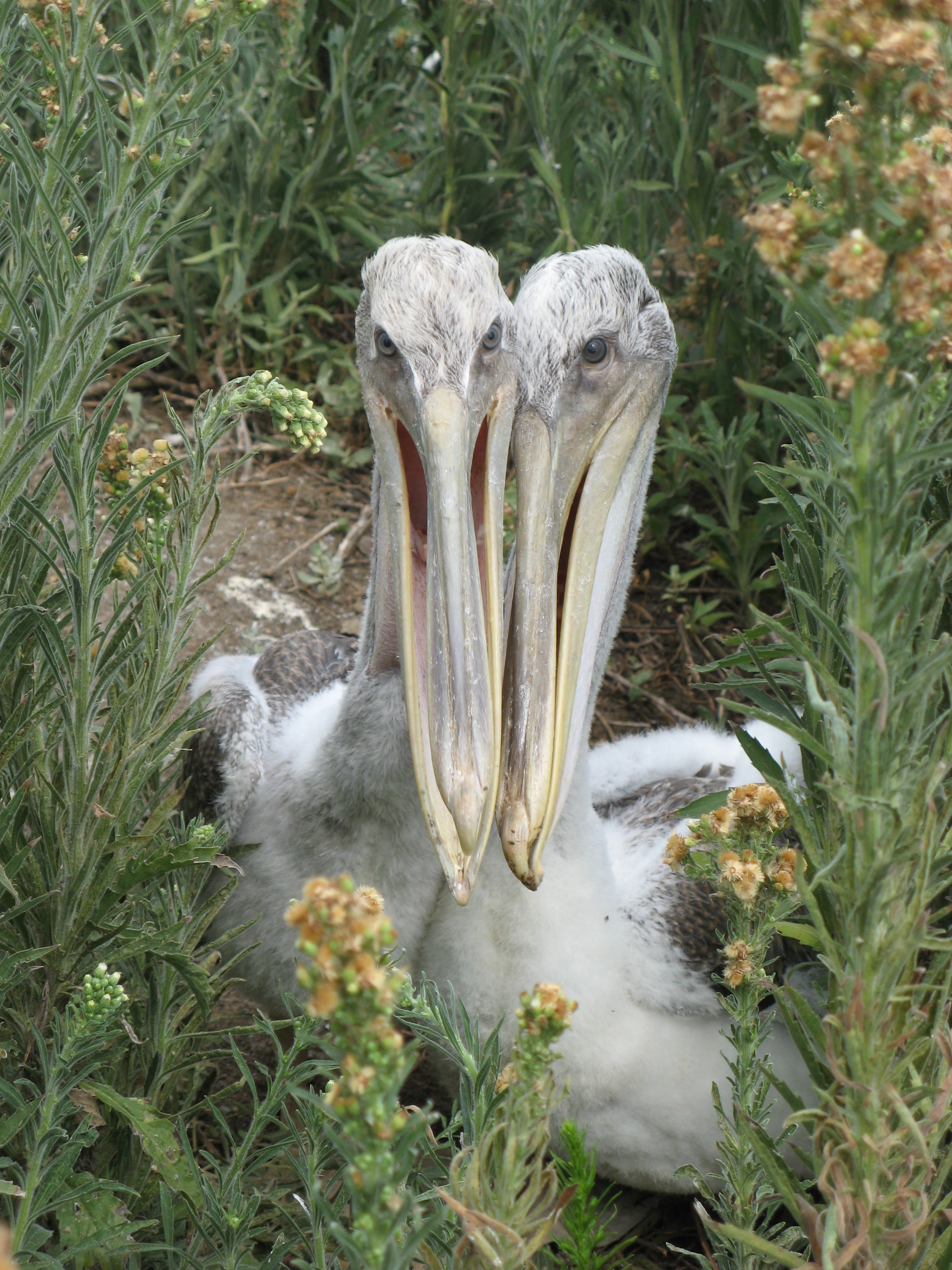
Juvenile brown pelicans hatched on Gaillard Island

Various birds were noted to be inhabiting the island by the time it was completed in 1981. In 1983 a biologist discovered four brown pelicans nesting on the island. This was the first sighting in Alabama since their decline due to hunting in the early 1900s. Pelican feathers, in that era, were used for women's hats. Further decline came in the 1940s due to the widespread use of the pesticide DDT. At that time, they were placed on both the Alabama and federal endangered species list. Partly due to increased nesting and propagation of the brown pelicans on Gaillard Island, the brown pelican was removed from the state's endangered species list in 1995, and in 2009, the brown pelican was removed from the federal endangered species list.

Today Gaillard Island is an important habitat for thousands of birds representing species of skimmers, stilts, terns, pelicans, egrets, herons, and ibis. Gaillard Island is also the only Alabama nesting site for Caspian terns, Sandwich terns, royal terns, and laughing gulls. The first recorded nesting of herring gulls occurred on Gaillard Island in 1986. The Alabama Department of Conservation and Natural Resources has closely monitored the colonial nesting shore and seabirds conducting annual surveys since 1998. During the first survey, they estimated that there were 10,000 nests on the island.

Vegetation is diverse on the island and consists of saltmeadow cordgrass, saltmarsh bulrush, salt marsh cattail, and American threesquare that naturally flourished behind the berms. Originally, smooth cordgrass was the only species that was planted.

A report by the Mobile Register in mid-2011 showed that pelican populations on the island dramatically increased from 2010. The report also indicated the pelicans on the island showed no effects stemming from the 2010 BP oil spill in terms of finding a reliable food source, a previous concern from environmental officials.

== Threats to the island ==
The human factor is not a threat to the island as boaters and jet skiers can reach the sand beach but are prohibited from walking on the island which would disturb the nesting grounds and disrupt the ecosystem of the island. Three hurricanes (Danny, Georges, and Katrina) have damaged the island, however. The U.S. Department of Homeland Security's Federal Emergency Management Agency (FEMA) division approved $8.6 million of financial assistance to restore Gaillard Island after the tidal surge associated with Hurricane Katrina on August 29, 2005, eroded and destroyed the island's levy and berm system.

== Sporting ==
Bird watching is the primary sport associated with the island. The Mobile Bay Audubon Society conducts tours for local enthusiasts and conservationists. The spring months are the best time for viewing the nesting activities. As a side effect, marine life is abundant around the island making this area a favorite spot for fishermen who catch speckled trout, flounder and mullet. Shrimp are also harvested.
