= Gaillard IV de Durfort =

Lord of Duras

Arms of the Barons of Durfort: Quarterly 1st and 4th: Argent, a bend azure; 2nd and 3rd: Gules, a lion rampant argent.

Gaillard IV de Durfort, Lord of Duras (died 1481), was a 15th-century Gascon noble of the Durfort family.

== Biography ==
Durfort was the eldest son of Gaillard III de Durfort and his wife Judiote of La Lande. A minor upon his father's death in 1444, he inherited the titles and possessions of his father. He obtained in 1446 a safeguard or conduct to go to England and to return to Aquitaine at his pleasure.

Durfort was one of the main vassals of the Duchy of Gascony. On 12 June 1451, he signed as representative of the nobility of Bordeaux, the treaty of capitulation of the city before the French army led by Jean de Dunois, Count of Dunois. The French, anxious to conciliate the inhabitants of the region, offered them favourable conditions and they were permitted to maintain their existing titles and lands. The following year, he returned to the favour of the English, contributing to the return of Bordeaux to John Talbot, 1st Earl of Shrewsbury. In 1453, after the French victory at the Battle of Castillon, the French routed the English forces from Gascony. The Count of Clermont invaded the Medoc and took Castelnau, while other French troops captured Cadillac. The castle of Blanquefort, held by Durfort, was the last to surrender.

After the capture of Bordeaux, King Charles VII of France issued directions that the leaders of the insurrection were to be saved, but to be exiled from France. Durfort went to England, and his property in France, the lands and castles of Blanquefort, Duras and Villandraut, with the barony of Duras, were confiscated and entrusted to vassals loyal to the crown.

He obtained from King Edward IV of England the office of governor of Calais, which he defended against French attacks. He was knighted as a member of the Order of the Garter, and remained faithful to Edward during the War of the Roses. In 1470, he was chamberlain to the Charles the Bold, Duke of Burgundy, whilst still retaining his functions at the English court. In 1473 Edward IV gave him the Lordship of Lesparre in the Medoc, a purely symbolic act and title since the English no longer had any control in Gascony. In 1474 he was one of the negotiators of the Treaty of London (25 July 1474), a temporary alliance between the Duchy of Burgundy and the Kingdom of England. Durfort was sent in 1475 at the head of the English army to attempt to reclaim the Duchies of Brittany and Burgundy.The English troops landed at Calais in June 1475, but didn't advance and withdrew in September.

King Louis XI of France recalled Durfort to France in June 1476 and returned his titles, lands and the castles of Blanquefort, Duras and Villandraut. As a result of Durfort's change of allegiance, he was expelled from the Order of the Garter. Durfort was killed during a battle in Burgundy about 1481.

== Marriage and children ==
Durfort married Anne, daughter of William de la Pole, 1st Duke of Suffolk, and probably illegitimate. They had the following known children:

- Aimery de Durfort (died before 1476)
- Jean de Durfort, his successor and mayor of Bordeaux
- Georges de Durfort
- Marguerite de Durfort

He also had an illegitimate son Bertrand.
