= Jim Gaylord =

American artist

- Born: Washington, North Carolina
- Known for: Painting

Jim Gaylord (born 1974) is an American artist living and working in New York City. Based in a tradition of collage, his work is usually made from heavy paper that is cut out and pieced together into relief-like pictures.

Gaylord was born in Washington, North Carolina. He received a degree in Film from the University of North Carolina at Greensboro in 1997, and an MFA from the University of California at Berkeley in 2005.

Gaylord's work has been exhibited internationally and is in the collections of the Museum of Modern Art in New York, the West Collection and the Progressive Art Collection.
