= Lino Gallardo =

Venezuelan musician

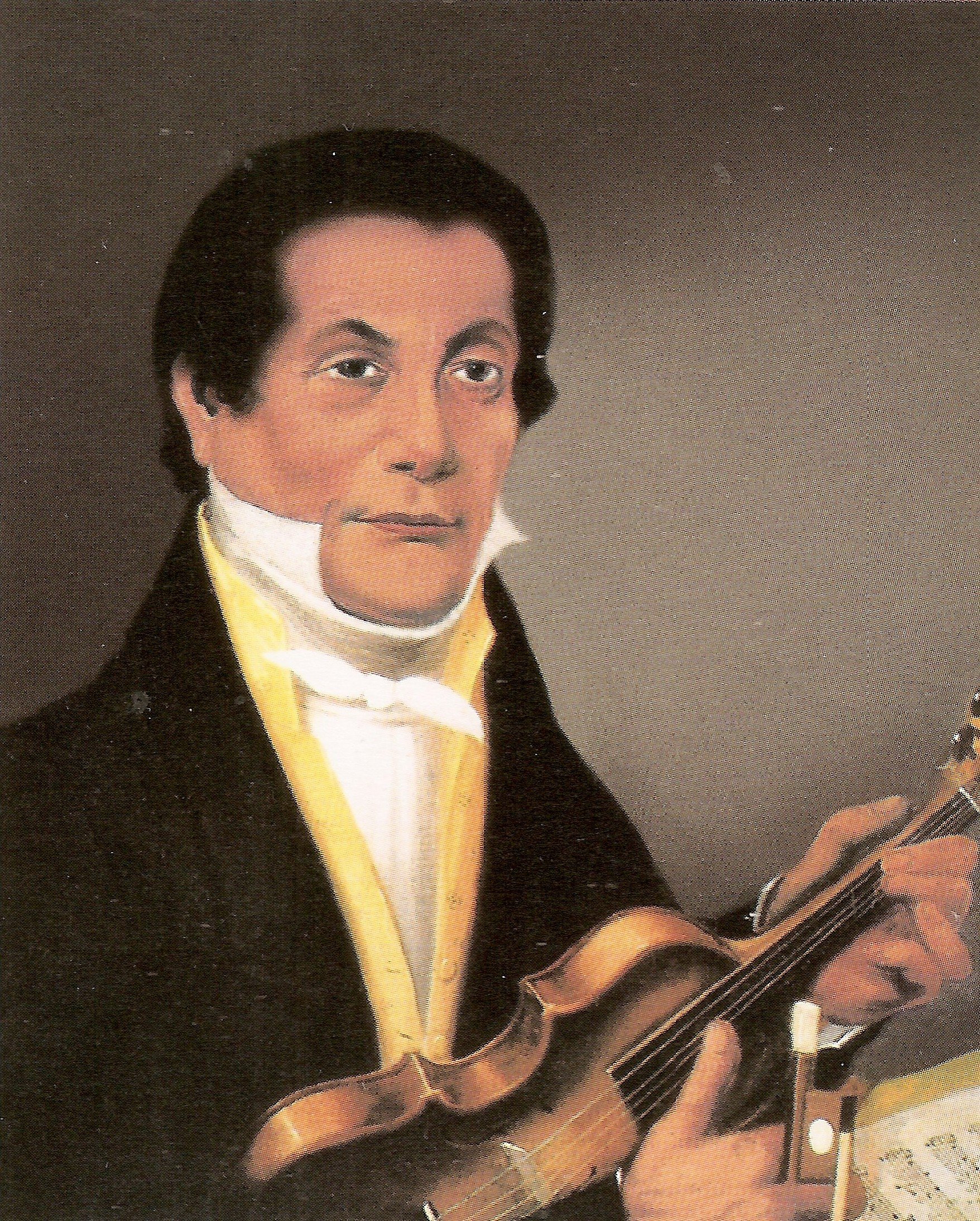
- Portrait by Juan Lovera
- Born: 1773; Ocumare del Tuy, Province of Venezuela, Spanish Empire
- Died: December 22, 1837; Caracas, Province of Caracas, Venezuela

Lino Gallardo (1773–1837) was a Venezuelan composer, conductor, and string player, and was among the musicians who participated in and contributed to the Wars of Independence.
