= Marcel Gaillard (Belgian footballer) =

Belgian footballer (1927-1976)

Personal information
- Full name: Marcel Elie Jean Gailard
- Date of birth: 15 January 1927
- Place of birth: Charleroi, Belgium
- Date of death: 1976 (aged 48–49)
- Place of death: Weymouth, Dorset, England
- Position: Winger

Youth career
- 1937–1946: OC Charleroi

Senior career*
Years	Team	Apps	(Gls)
1946–1947	Tonbridge		
1947–1948	Olympic Charleroi	2	(0)
1948–1951	Crystal Palace	21	(3)
1951–1953	Portsmouth	59	(7)
- Weymouth
- Yeovil Town
1960–1961	Dorchester Town		
Total		82	(10)

Managerial career
- 1960–1964: Dorchester Town
- * Club domestic league appearances and goals

Marcel Elie Jean Gaillard (15 January 1927 – 1976) was a Belgian professional footballer who played in England for Tonbridge, Crystal Palace, Portsmouth, Weymouth, Yeovil Town and Dorchester Town, making a total of 80 appearances in the Football League. Gaillard was the first non-British footballer to play for Crystal Palace; he was also the first non-British player to score for them. He also played in Belgium for Olympic Charleroi. In 1960 he went to Dorchester Town as player-manager but had to retire from playing soon after due to injury, continuing to manage the side until 1964.
