= Villandraut =

- Commune
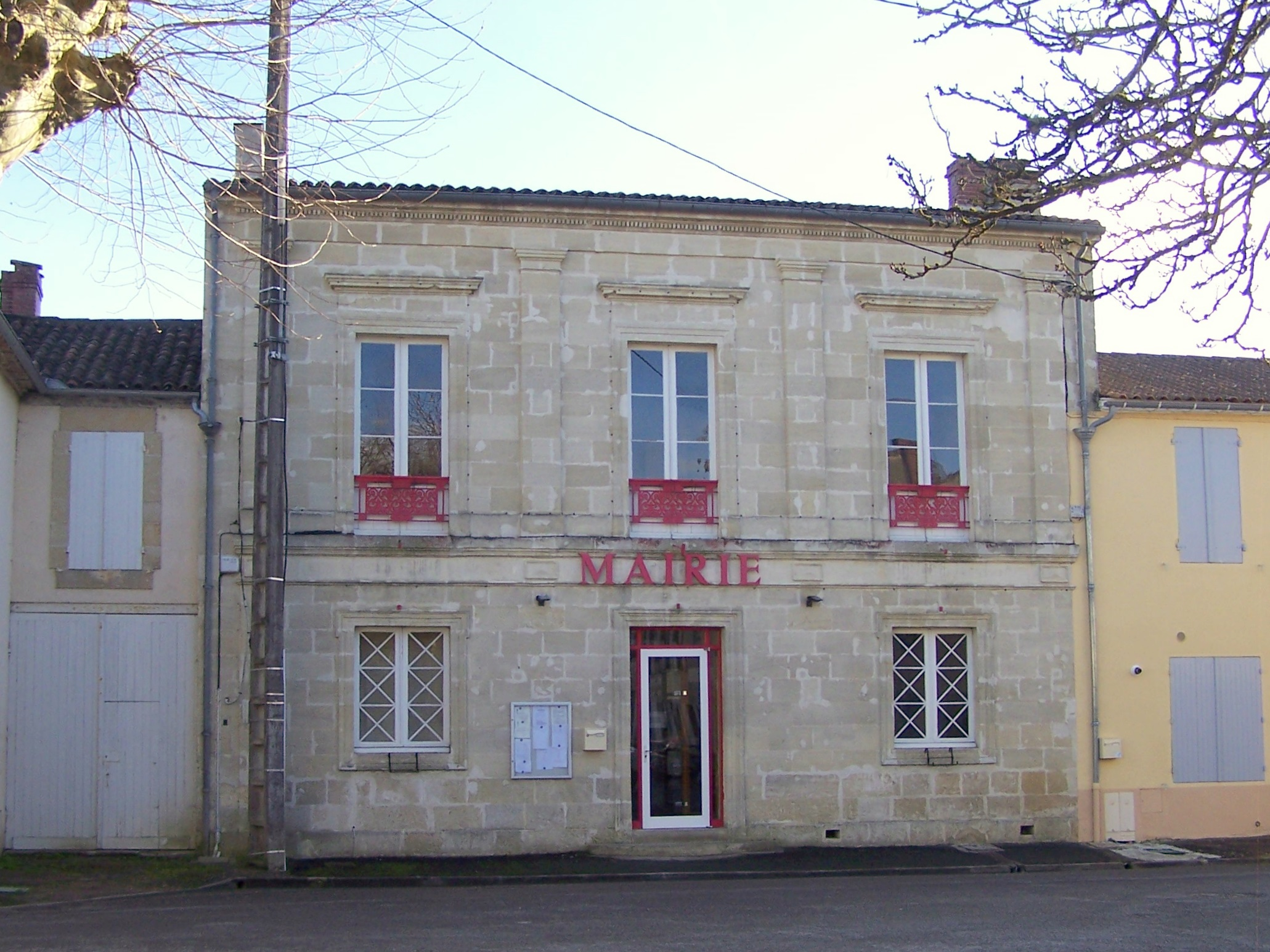
- The town hall in Villandraut

- Coat of arms
- Location of Villandraut
- Location within France Location within Nouvelle-Aquitaine
- Coordinates: 44°27′30″N 0°22′16″W
- Country: France
- Region: Nouvelle-Aquitaine
- Department: Gironde
- Arrondissement: Langon
- Canton: Le Sud-Gironde
- Intercommunality: Sud Gironde

Government
  - Mayor (2020–2026): Patrick Breteau
- Area^{1}: 12.58 km^{2} (4.86 sq mi)
- Elevation: 31 m (102 ft)
- Highest elevation: 54 m (177 ft)
- Lowest elevation: 20 m (66 ft)
- Population (2023): 1,112
  - Density: 88.39/km^{2} (228.9/sq mi)
- Time zone: UTC+01:00 (CET)
  - Summer (DST): UTC+02:00 (CEST)
- INSEE/Postal code: 33547 /33730
- ^{1} French Land Register data, which excludes lakes, ponds, glaciers > 1 km^{2} (0.386 sq mi or 247 acres) and river estuaries.

Villandraut (French pronunciation: [vilɑ̃dʁo]; Occitan: Vilandraut) is a commune in the Gironde department in Nouvelle-Aquitaine in southwestern France.

Pope Clement V was born in Villandraut. He is known for moving the Curia from Rome to Avignon, ushering in the period known as the Avignon Papacy.

== Population ==
Historical population
Year	Pop.	±% p.a.
1968	940	—
1975	887	−0.83%
1982	914	+0.43%
1990	777	−2.01%
1999	815	+0.53%
2007	916	+1.47%
2012	995	+1.67%
2017	1,059	+1.25%
2023	1,112	+0.82%
Source: INSEE

== See also ==
- Communes of the Gironde department
