= Château de Randan =

Former French Royal castle in Puy-de-Dôme

Coordinates: 46°00′55″N 3°21′28″E

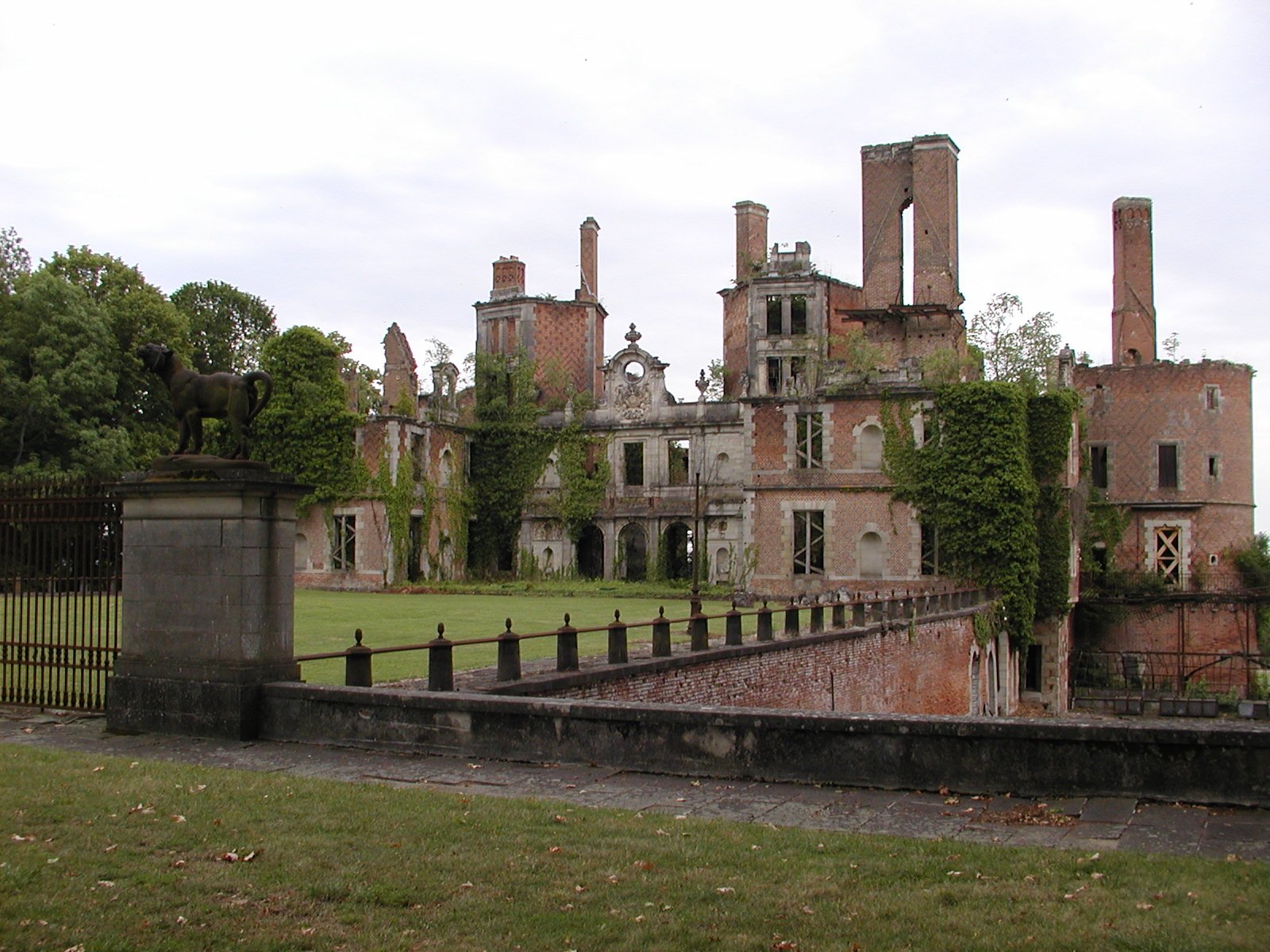
Château de Randan today

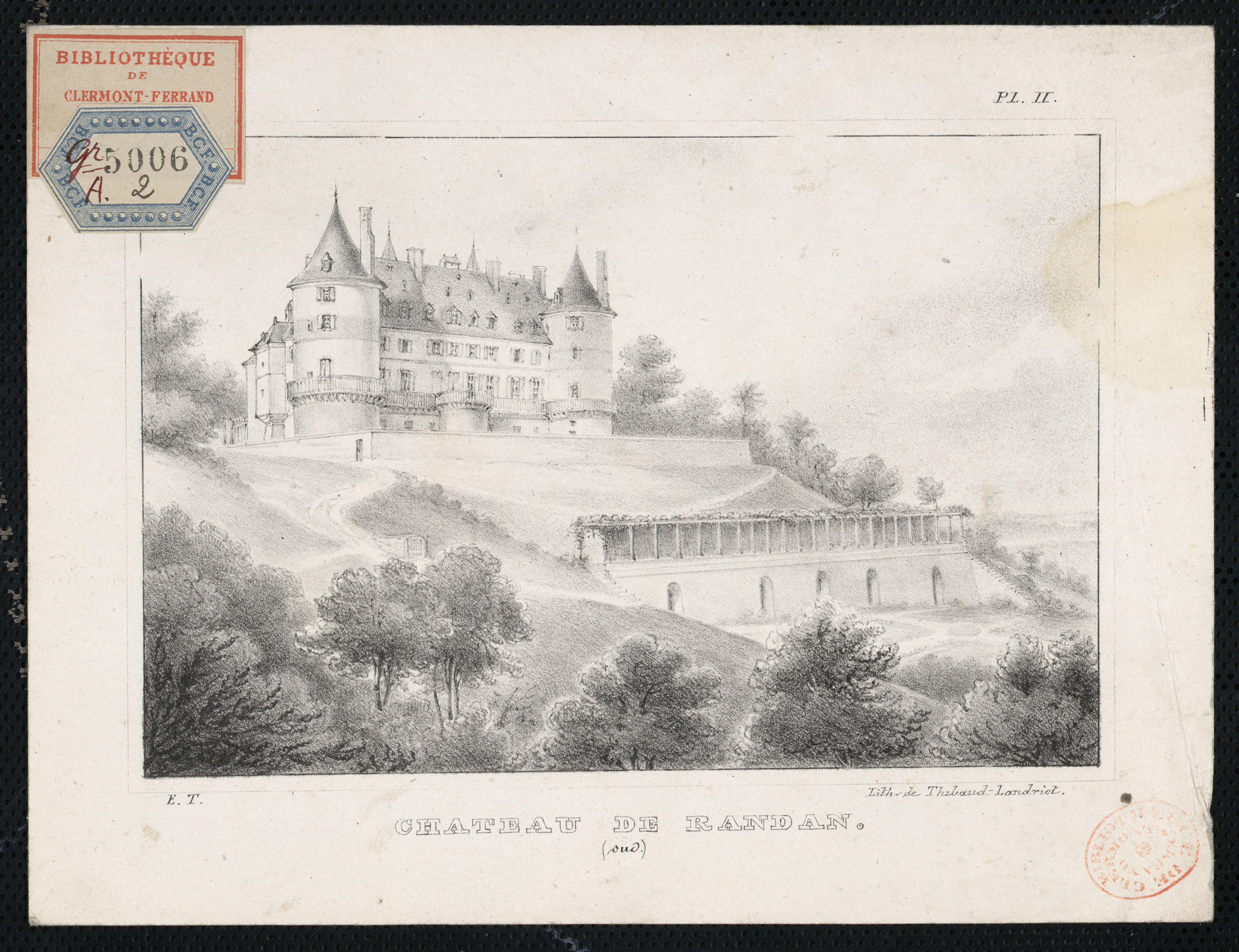
Château de Randan in its heyday

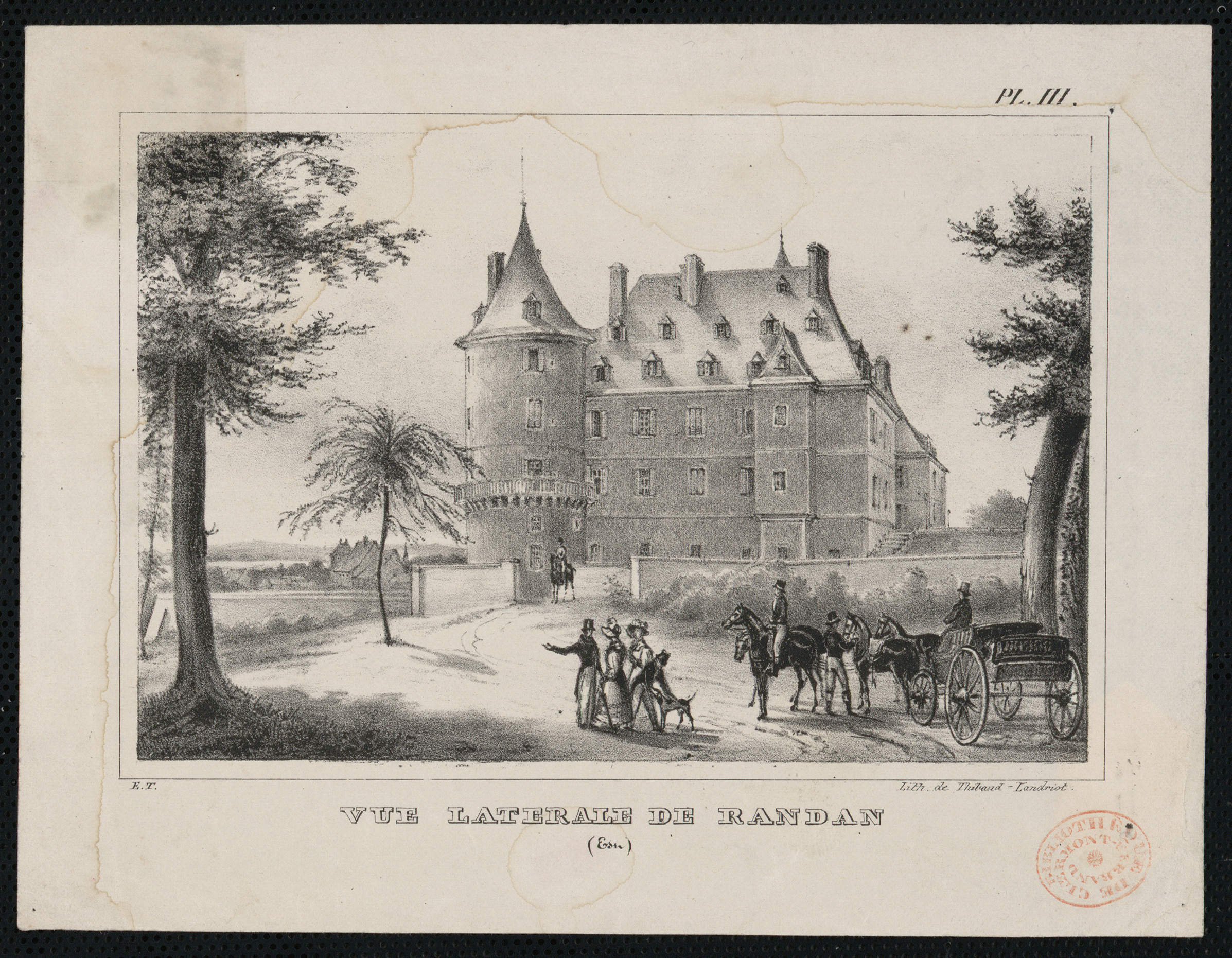
Château de Randan in an old engraving

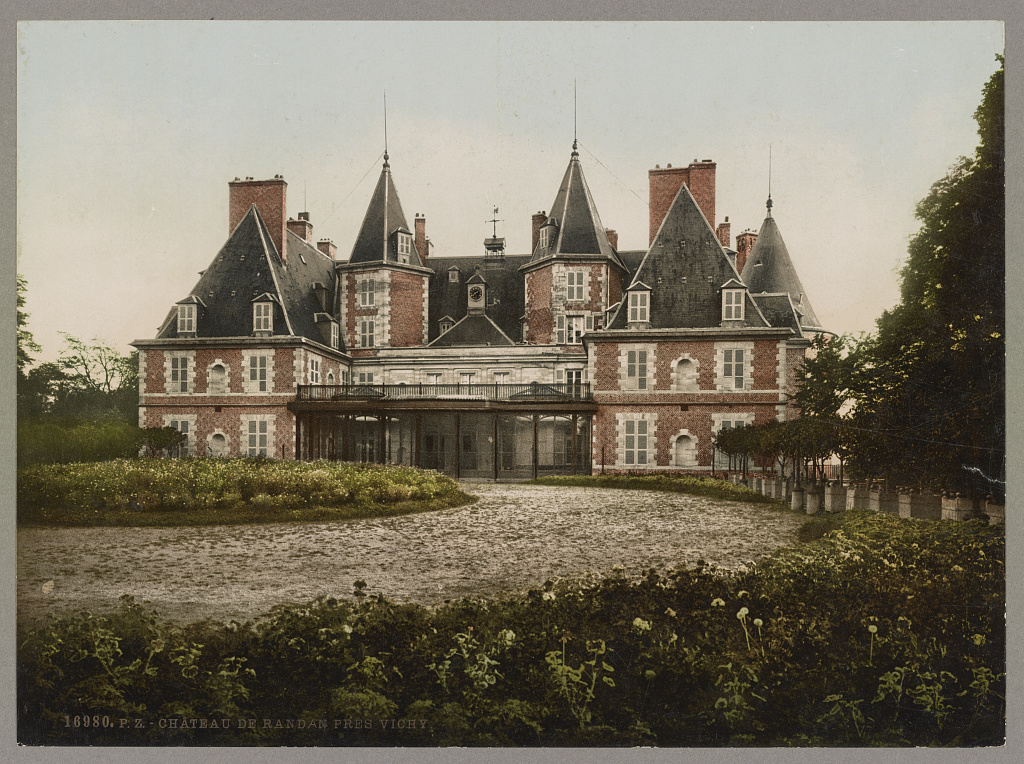
Château de Randan in old photo

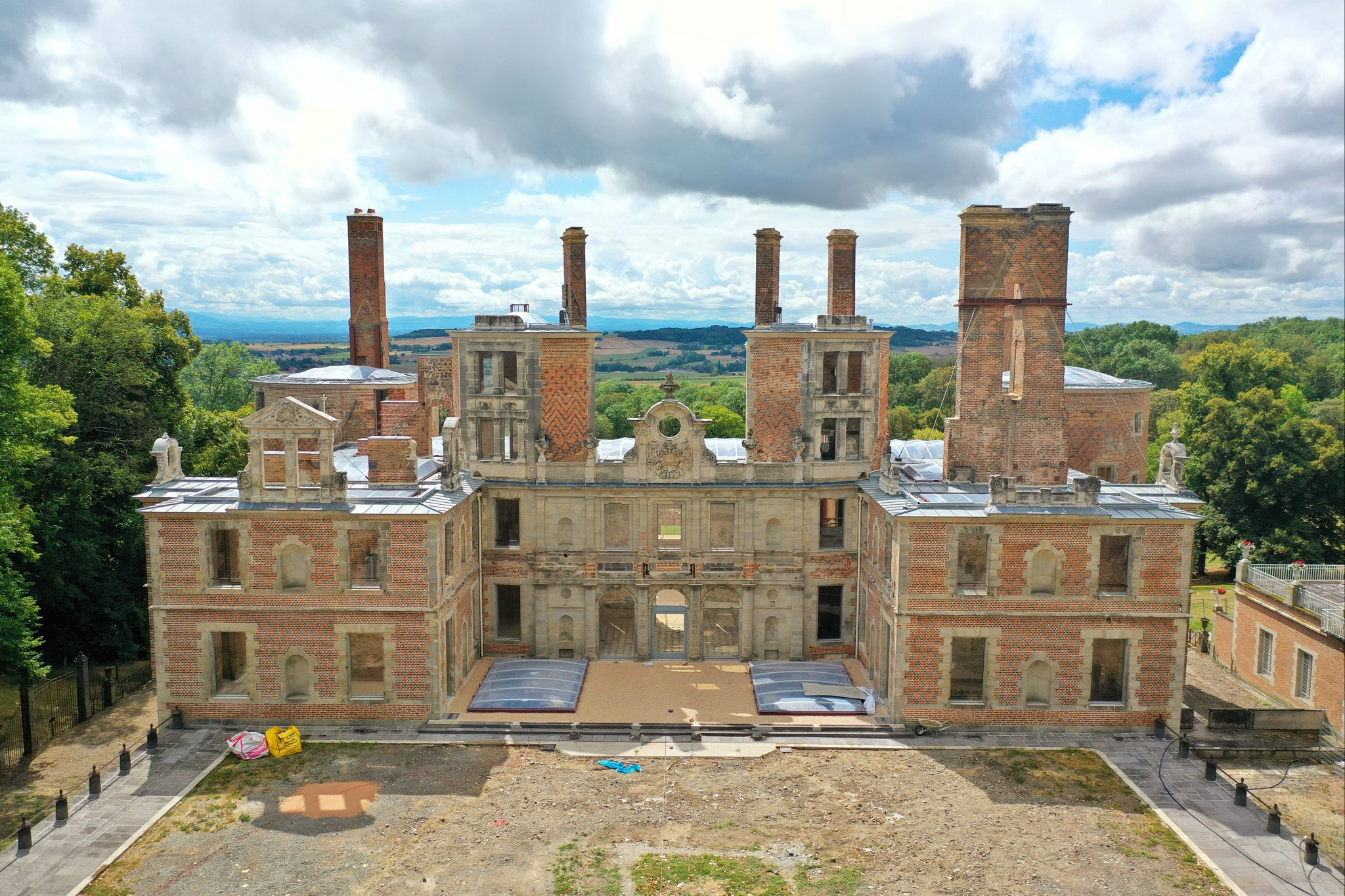
Château de Randan in a drone view

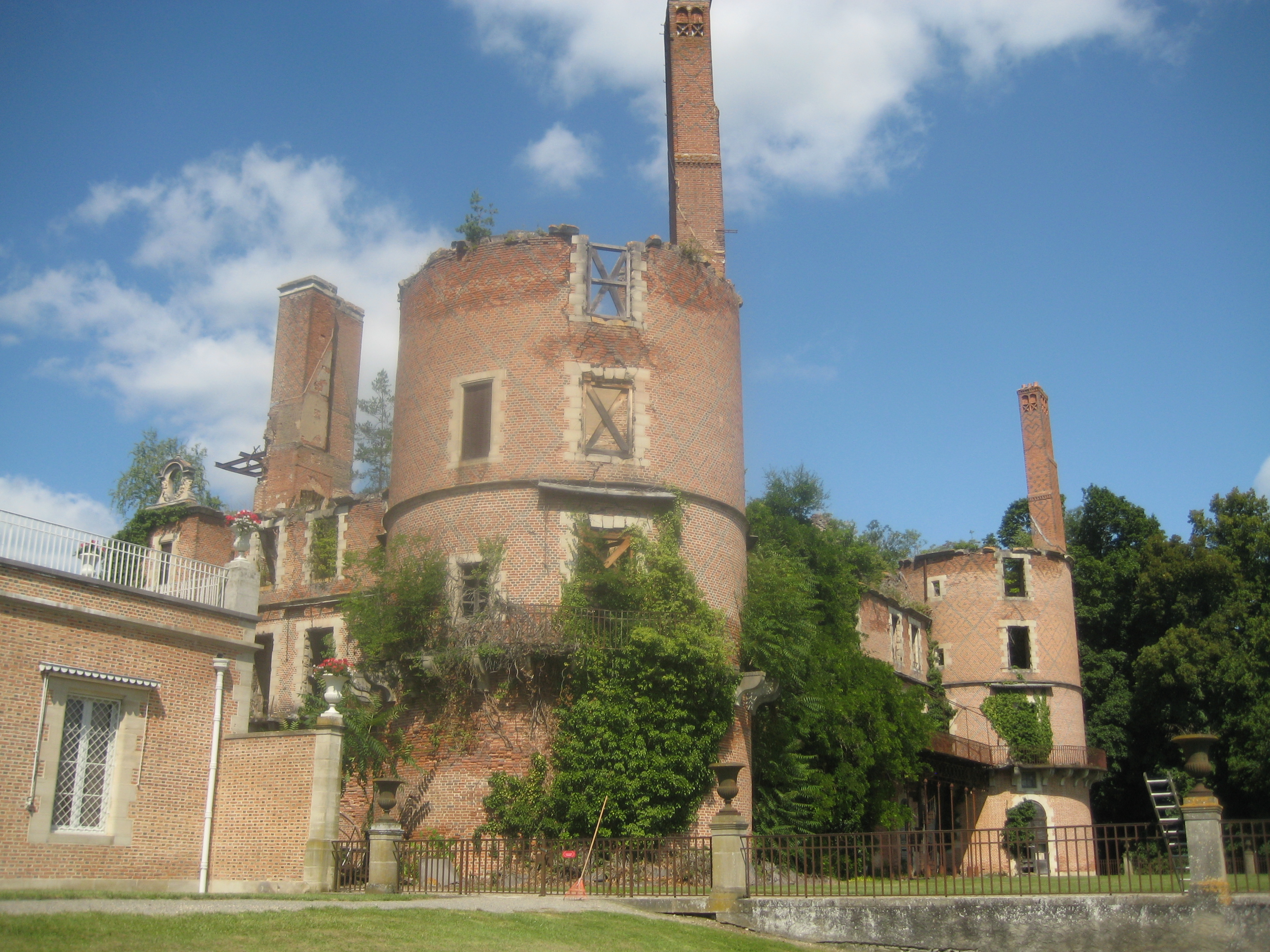
The ruins today

The Château de Randan was a former royal domain in the French town of Randan in the department of Puy-de-Dôme.

The châtellenie of Randan is first recorded in the 12th century and the castle in the 13th century. It was rebuilt under Francis I of France and the châtellenie promoted to a dukedom in 1661. It was acquired in 1821 by Princess Adélaïde of Orléans, sister of Louis Philippe I.

The ruins have been listed as an official national monument since February 21, 2001.

== History ==
=== Beginnings and heyday ===
In 1821, the original Château of Randan, constructed in the 16th century, and forty hectares of land were acquired by Louis-Philippe, Duke of Orléans, and his sister Adélaïde. As early as 1822, they commissioned the restoration of the existing building and an extension by the architect Pierre-François-Léonard Fontaine.

According to reports, the future King of the French purportedly pushed for this purchase and the subsequent renovations to secure a retreat away from Paris in times of peril, preferring an exile in Auvergne over a new emigration, although he was still forced to leave for England in March 1848, where he died two years later at Claremont.

The close proximity of vast forested estates of the family served as another compelling reason for this acquisition.

The project is ambitious. Alongside, the restoration of the castle, other buildings were constructed: the Inspector's house, the grand outbuildings, and an orangery. Furthermore, the estate was expanded, which reached 110 hectares upon the death of Adélaïde d'Orléans in 1847. Additionally, a splendid landscaped park was established.

Adélaïde, having died unmarried and childless, the estate passed to one of her nephews, the youngest son of King Louis-Philippe, Antoine, Duke of Montpensier. Upon his death, his eldest daughter, Princess Marie Isabelle, inherited the estate. Married to her first cousin, Philippe d'Orléans, the first Count of Paris, she set out to restore the estate to its former glory, introducing modern conveniences and enhancements such as electricity in 1909 and running water in 1912.

Henry of Orléans, the second Count of Paris, spent his childhood in this family property, where in late July 1914, the family received news of the declaration of war. In 1915, after setting up a military hospital annex to the one in Vichy, the first Countess of Paris and her daughter, the Queen of Portugal, Amélie of Orléans, acted as nurses, caring for wounded soldiers.

The regional writer Henri Pourrat depicted this Bourbonnais castle and "its tapestries of black and pink bricks (...) the esplanade with noble shades (...) Its immense kitchens were famous, so well arranged that the aromas could not mingle to alter the flavor of the sauces."

=== Decline ===
In 1919, upon the death of Isabelle d'Orléans-Montpensier, the estate passed to her youngest son, Ferdinand, the last "Duke of Montpensier." In 1921, at the insistence of his sisters, he married Isabelle Gonzalez de Olañeta e Ibarreta (1895-1958), the 3rd Marchioness of Valdeterazzo, at the church of Randan. She was the daughter of the Viscount of Las Antrinas. The couple lived at the Randan estate for only three years, as Ferdinand died prematurely in 1924, at the age of forty.

The following summer, during the night of July 25 to 26, 1925, while the "duchess" and a few friends were staying there, the castle was ravaged by a violent fire, leaving ruins that were never rebuilt.

The most exquisite pieces of furniture salvaged from the blaze were transported to Spain by the "Duchess of Montpensier"; the remaining items, including numerous hunting trophies of Ferdinand d'Orléans and dioramas crafted by the renowned English taxidermist Rowland Ward, were stored in the vast outbuildings of the castle.

On July 25, 1940, the founding charter of the "Compagnons de France" was elaborated in the expansive clearing of the Randan forest. This movement, created and later abolished by the Vichy regime, inspired by scouting and the military, aimed to "guide adolescents lost in the exodus and disadvantaged young boys," led by Henry Dhavernas and then Guillaume de Tournemire. This event could not have been organized without the agreement of its owner, who was close to Francoist circles. In September 1940, the first "youth camp" was organized there, and a photograph shows Philippe Pétain, head of the French State, surrounded by young people in uniform.

The Marshal returned on July 26, 1942, where 5,000 youths had set up an immense camp of white tents - and paid tribute to their actions. This day was reported by the Parisian newspaper L'Illustration on August 8, 1942. An oak tree was planted on this occasion, and on August 9, the first Compagnons de France camp was opened in Randan. By the end of that year, 230 camps were established.

After the Second World War, the "second Count of Paris", presumptive heir of the Duke of Montpensier, his maternal uncle who died without descendants, unsuccessfully claimed a significant amount of family silverware and jewelry from the "Montpensier bequest" from his aunt by marriage and then from her heir, José María de Huarte. He was dismissed by the court, perhaps, as some have suggested, due to the personal intervention of Francisco Franco, with whom the dowager duchess had close ties. Indeed, she bequeathed her possessions to José María de Huarte, a Spanish aristocrat who served as her butler and secret second husband, possibly to avoid hefty inheritance taxes upon her death.

=== Rebirth ===
In February 1991, the French government, concerned about the dispersion of the Orléans family's memorabilia stored there for seventy years, classified the neoclassical chapel (1831), which houses, among other things, three cenotaphs copied from those in the family necropolis of Dreux - including that of Adelaide of Orléans with the effigy by Aimé Millet dated 1876 - as Historic Monuments as part of a furniture ensemble related to an ancient residence, as well as the majority of the collections.

Henri d'Orléans, the "second Count of Paris," intervened with Valéry Giscard d'Estaing, President of the Auvergne Regional Council, to prevent Randan from being emptied and dismantled.

In 1999, the Huarte heirs put up for public auction the collections of the Randan estate - the catalog (900 lots) of the significant sale scheduled for 23 and May of the same year, was prepared by the Parisian auction house Millon et associés. The state opposed this and in 2000 acquired the collections consisting of thirty-five paintings, including "The Duke of Montpensier and his entourage in the company of the King of Greece and his court before the ruins of the temple of Jupiter in Athens" by Dominique Papety, furniture (including a set of fourteen armchairs delivered by Jacob for the castle), 280 pieces of weaponry, and 4,896 other objects. In early 2003, the Regional Council of Auvergne purchased the buildings and initiated an extensive renovation program.

On October 30, 2000, at the Hôtel Drouot in Paris, a sale of "Historical Memorabilia from the Estate of Mgr Henri d'Orléans, Count of Paris" took place; on November 29 of the same year, the Millon et associés auction house sold one hundred and twenty pieces from the Randan Castle service "with a green mitt background" (Sèvres, 1838-1842, flower and fruit motifs by the painter Sinsson: probably Jacques-Nicolas or Pierre Sinsson), derived from the service of Louis-Philippe at Fontainebleau, comprising 1,352 pieces for sixty place settings, which was ordered by the king for his sister.

In 2005, the Association of Friends of the Royal Domain of Randan was established to support these efforts and collect historical documents related to the estate.

== Architecture ==
The Château de Randan is constructed with polychrome bricks over two stories and topped with tall slate roofs pierced with ornate dormer windows. Its north façade features a main building flanked by two hexagonal towers and two corner pavilions.

The kitchens, adjacent to the castle and built in 1821, consist of eight vaulted rooms and are covered by a terrace. The chapel, in neoclassical style, retains all of its interior decoration, including parquet floors, stained glass windows, stucco work, and trompe-l'œil ceiling panels dating back to 1831.

Other buildings include the orangery, the inspector's house, and the grand outbuildings, a building constructed in an H-shaped plan, which housed various facilities including the dairy, stables, harness room, and workshops.

== Park and gardens ==
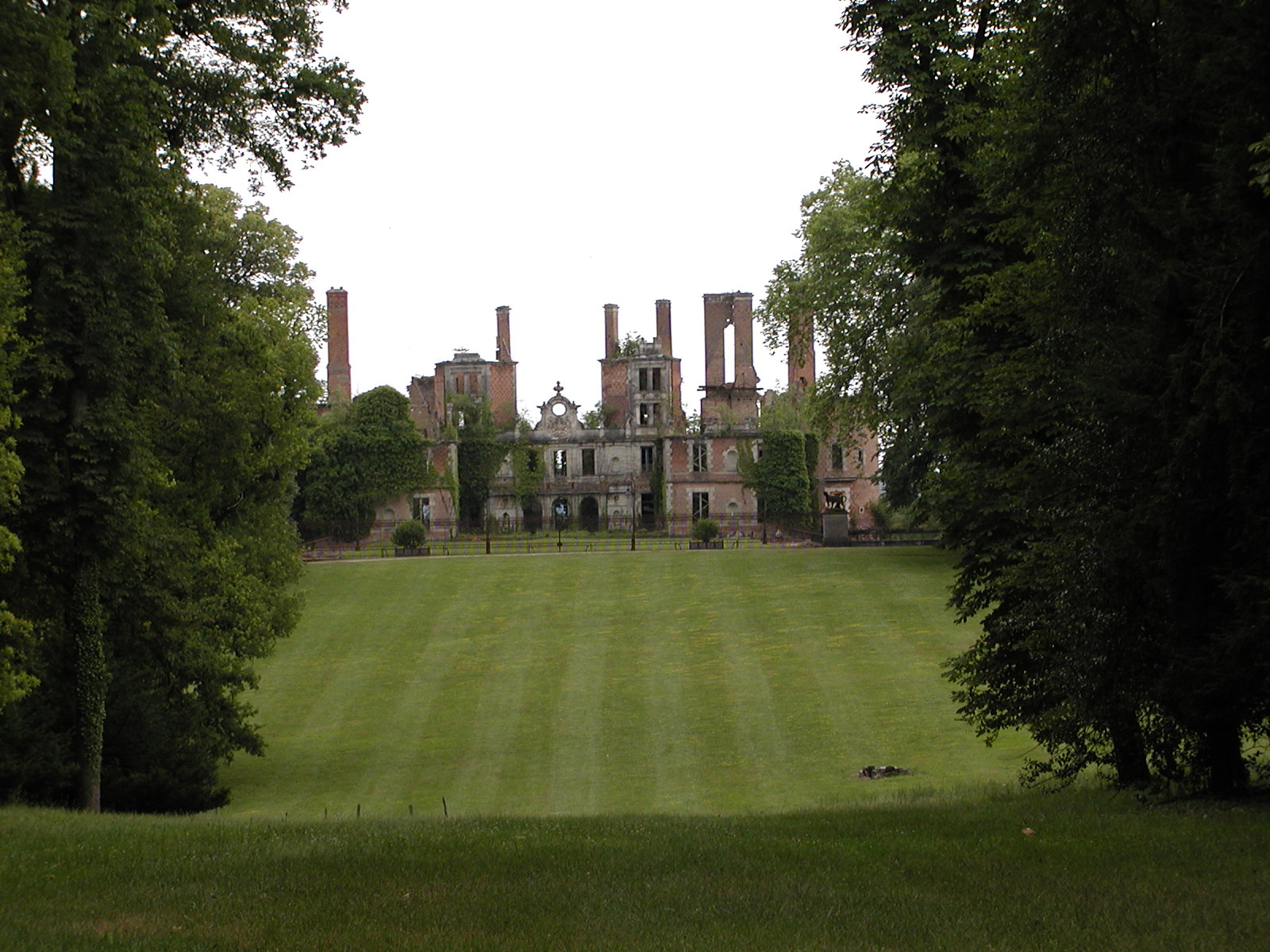
View of the park today

The park of the château is designed by Pierre Fontaine, who drew inspiration from several traditional garden styles: formal gardens around the castle according the French formal garden style; vast landscaped areas adorned with water features, an obelisk, and other structures typical of the English landscape garden; and an Italian terrace with pergolas, wrought ironwork, lanterns, and planters.

The park consists of large wooded areas, meadows planted with both common and exotic species, and also includes several artificial ponds.

It also features a large orangery (56 meters long), a vegetable garden with three hot houses (two of which were built in 1837 following the model of those in the gardens of the Palace of Versailles, now disappeared), an orchard, and two icehouses.
