= 1959 Coupe de France final =

- Event: 1958–59 Coupe de France
Le Havre	Sochaux
Le Havre	Sochaux
2	2
- After extra time
- Date: 3 May 1959
- Venue: Olympique Yves-du-Manoir, Colombes
- Referee: Jean-Louis Groppi
- Attendance: 50,778

Replay
Le Havre	Sochaux
3	0
- Date: 18 May 1959
- Venue: Olympique Yves-du-Manoir, Colombes
- Referee: Jean-Louis Groppi
- Attendance: 36,655

The 1959 Coupe de France final was a football match held at Stade Olympique Yves-du-Manoir, Colombes on May 3, 1959, and May 18, 1959, that saw Le Havre AC of Division 2 defeat FC Sochaux-Montbéliard.

== Match details ==
=== First match ===
3 May 1959

Le Havre	2–2 (a.e.t.)	Sochaux
Ferrari 2'; Bouchache 113'		Eloy 45' (o.g.); Gardien 109'

Stade Olympique Yves-du-Manoir, Colombes
Attendance: 50,778
Referee: Jean-Louis Groppi

GK	(France) Christian Villenave
DF	(France) Kassem Hassouna
DF	(France) Jean Lagadec
DF	(France) Edouard Salzborn
DF	(France) Albert Eloy
MF	(France) Jacques Meyer
MF	(France) Jean Saunier
MF	(France) Jacques Ferrari
FW	(France) André Strappe(c)
FW	(France) (Algeria) Hocine Bouchache
FW	(France) (Cameroon) Frédéric N'Doumbé
Manager:
(France) Lucien Jasseron Man Of The Match: Assistant Referees:

GK	(France) Raymond Barthelmebs
DF	(France) Pierre Lubrano
DF	(France) Lucien Mille
DF	(France) Georges Bout
DF	(France) André Mazimann
MF	(France) Joseph Tellechea
MF	(France) Samuel Edimo
MF	(Sweden) Yngve Brodd
FW	(France) Julien Stopyra
FW	(France) Serge Bourdoncle
FW	(France) René Gardien (c)
Manager:
(France) Paul Wartel

=== Replay ===
18 May 1959

Le Havre	3–0	Sochaux
Meyer 21'; N'Doumbé 31'; Navarro 87'

Stade Olympique Yves-du-Manoir, Colombes
Attendance: 36,655
Referee: Jean-Louis Groppi

GK	(France) Christian Villenave
DF	(France) Kassem Hassouna
DF	(France) Jean Lagadec
DF	(France) Edouard Salzborn
DF	(France) Albert Eloy
MF	(France) Jacques Meyer
MF	(France) André Strappe(c)
MF	(France) Jacques Ferrari
FW	(France) Valentin Navarro
FW	(France) (Algeria) Hocine Bouchache
FW	(France) (Cameroon) Frédéric N'Doumbé
Manager:
(France) Lucien Jasseron Man Of The Match: Assistant Referees:

GK	(France) Paul Wendé
DF	(France) André Mazimann
DF	(France) Lucien Mille
DF	(France) Georges Bout
DF	(France) Pierre Lubrano
MF	(France) Joseph Tellechea
MF	(France) Samuel Edimo
MF	(Sweden) Yngve Brodd
FW	(France) Julien Stopyra
FW	(France) Raphaël Tellechea
FW	(France) René Gardien (c)
Manager:
(France) Paul Wartel

== See also ==
- Coupe de France 1958-59
