= Michel Jacques =

French footballer (1924–1997)

Personal information
- Full name: Michel Albert Georges Jacques
- Date of birth: 9 January 1924
- Place of birth: Sochaux, France
- Date of death: 1 March 1997 (aged 73)
- Place of death: Montbéliard, France
- Height: 1.70 m (5 ft 7 in)
- Position: Forward

Senior career*
Years	Team	Apps	(Gls)
1942–1943	Sochaux-Montbéliard		
1943–1944	Nancy-Lorraine		
1944–1945	Rouen		
1945–1950	Sochaux-Montbéliard		
1950–1952	Strasbourg		
1952–1957	Racing Besançon		
1957–1958	Pays d'Aix		

International career
1944	France	1	(0)
- * Club domestic league appearances and goals

Michel Albert Georges Jacques (9 January 1924 – 1 March 1997) was a French footballer who played as a forward for Sochaux-Montbéliard in the 1940s. He also made one appearance for the French national team in 1944.

== Playing career ==
=== Club career ===
Born on 9 January 1924 in the Doubs town of Sochaux, Jacques began his football career at his hometown club Sochaux-Montbéliard in 1942, aged 18. Together with Georges Sesia, Roger Guérin, and Roger Magnin, he was a member of the short-lived Nancy-Lorraine federal team that won the 1944 Coupe de France final against Reims-Champagne at the Parc des Princes on 7 May, scoring his side's third goal in an eventual 4–0 victory. After the final, the 20-year-old Jacques stated that "he had the most beautiful day of his life".

After a short stint with Rouen (1944–45), Jacques returned to Sochaux-Montbéliard, remaining there for five seasons, until 1950, four in the top-flight and one in the second division (1946–47). In 1950, he signed for Strasbourg, where he had an imidiate impact, because in his first season at the club, they won the Coupe de France, beating Valenciennes 3–0 in the final. On the following day, the journalists of L'Équipe described him as a "hard-working and unrepentant left-winger", who "deserves the citation for his constant activity in all situations; it is a shame he lacks the use of his right foot".

After leaving Strasbourg in 1952, Jacques joined Racing Besançon, with whom he played for five years, until 1957, when he moved to Pays d'Aix, where he retired in 1958, aged 34. In total, he scored 57 goals in 172 matches in Ligue 1.

=== International career ===
On 23 March 1947, the 23-year-old Jacques earned his first (and only) international cap for France in a friendly match against Portugal at the Colombes, helping his side keep a clean-sheet in a 1–0 win. He later stated that he was so nervous when he walked into the field that "You could have cracked nuts with my legs". After the match, Gaston Barreau, the national team manager, publicly stated that Jacques lacked maturity

== Death ==
Michel Jacques died in Montbéliard on 1 March 1997, at the age of 73.

== Honours ==
Reims-Champagne

- Ligue 1:
  - Champions (1): 1944

RC Strasbourg

  - Champions (1): 1951
