= 1944 Coupe de France final =

- Event: 1943–44 Coupe de France
| ÉF Nancy-Lorraine | ÉF Reims-Champagne |
| 4 | 0 |
- Date: 7 May 1944
- Venue: Parc des Princes, Paris
- Referee: Charles Tibaldi
- Attendance: 31,995

The 1944 Coupe de France final was a football match held at Parc des Princes, Paris on May 7, 1944, that saw EF Nancy-Lorraine defeat EF Reims-Champagne 4–0 thanks to goals by Marcel Parmeggiani, Marcel Poblomme (2) and Michel Jacques.

== Match details ==
7 May 1944

| ÉF Nancy-Lorraine | 4–0 | ÉF Reims-Champagne |
|---|---|---|
| Parmeggiani 21'; Poblomme 54', 74'; Jacques 66' |

Parc des Princes, Paris
Attendance: 31,995
Referee: Charles Tibaldi

| GK | (France) Roger Guérin "Coulon" |
| DF | (France) Lucien Rué |
| DF | (France) Jean Mathieu |
| DF | (France) Pierre Givert |
| DF | (France) Roger Magnin | (c) |
| MF | (France) Jean Grandidier |
| MF | (France) Georges Sesia |
| FW | (France) Jean Pessoneaux |
| FW | (France) Marcel Poblomme |
| FW | (France) Marcel Parmeggiani |
| FW | (France) Michel Jacques |
Manager:
(France) Paul Wartel Assistant Referees: Fourth Official:

| GK | (France) Alfred Dambach |
| DF | (France) Daniel Prince |
| DF | (France) Louis Carrara |
| DF | (France) Ignace Kowalczyk |
| DF | (France) Pierre Brambilla | (c) |
| MF | (France) Henri Roessler |
| MF | (France) Jean-Louis Pradel |
| FW | (France) Albert Batteux |
| FW | (France) Pierre Flamion |
| FW | (France) André Petitfils |
| FW | (France) Ferenc Szücs "Szego" |
Manager:
(France) Sarkis Garabedian

== See also ==
- 1943–44 Coupe de France
