= 1980–81 Eintracht Frankfurt season =

Eintracht Frankfurt
1980-81 season
- Chairman: Achaz von Thümen
- Manager: Lothar Buchmann
- Bundesliga: 5th
- DFB-Pokal: Winner
- UEFA Cup: 3rd Round
- Top goalscorer: League: Bernd Hölzenbein (11); All: Cha Bum-kun (16)
- Highest home attendance: 59,000 29 November 1980 v Bayern Munich (league)
- Lowest home attendance: 8,000 13 December 1980 v Fortuna Düsseldorf (league)
- Average home league attendance: 21,500
Home colours	Away colours

The 1980–81 Eintracht Frankfurt season was the 81st season in the club's football history. In 1980–81 the club played in the Bundesliga, the top tier of German football. It was the club's 18th season in the Bundesliga.

The season ended up with Eintracht winning the DFB-Pokal for the third time.

== Matches ==
=== Legend ===
Win Draw Loss Postponed

=== Friendlies ===
19 July 1980	Schlüchtern XI (West Germany)	0–11	(West Germany) Eintracht Frankfurt	Sinntal, West Germany
14:30 CEST		(Report)	Cha Bum-kun 14' 76'; Schaub 26' 45'; Nickel 41' 68'; Lorant 53' (pen.) 61'; 73' (o.g.); Lottermann 90'	Attendance: 1,500

22 July 1980	SSV Eintracht Überherrn (West Germany)	0–6	(West Germany) Eintracht Frankfurt	Überherrn, West Germany
		(Report)	Hölzenbein 18'; Cha Bum-kun 24', 33', 82'; Nachtweih 58'; Lorant 84'	Attendance: 4,000; Referee: Treib

23 July 1980	TV Ebern (West Germany)	0–12	(West Germany) Eintracht Frankfurt	Ebern, West Germany
		(Report)	Neuberger 11'; Cha Bum-kun 20'; Nachtweih 32', 38', 79', 83'; Lorant 43'; Nickel 45'; Körbel 48'; Lottermann 74'	Attendance: 4,000

26 July 1980 Baden-Pokal (Semi-Final)	Karlsruher SC (West Germany)	2–2 (a.e.t.) (5–3 p)	(West Germany) Eintracht Frankfurt	Offenburg, West Germany
	Fanz 66'; Günther 82'	(Report)	Hölzenbein 4'; Nachtweih 5'	Attendance: 10,000; Referee: Truttenbach
	Penalties
	(penalty scored) Struth; (penalty scored) Trenkel; (penalty scored) Groß; (penalty scored) Becker; (penalty scored) Harforth		(penalty scored) Nickel; (penalty missed) Schaub; (penalty scored) Nachtweih; (penalty scored) Sziedat

27 July 1980 Baden-Pokal (3rd place play-off)	Offenburger FV (West Germany)	2–6	(West Germany) Eintracht Frankfurt	Offenburg, West Germany
	Hertweck 16', 70'	(Report)	Cha Bum-kun 6'; Nickel 26', 62', 76'; Borchers 55'; Lottermann 66'	Attendance: 12,000; Referee: Schnurr

29 July 1980	FC Luzern (Switzerland)	0–4	(West Germany) Eintracht Frankfurt	Luzern, Switzerland
		(Report)	Rahmen 4' (o.g.); Gruber 26'; Cha Bum-kun 44'; Schaub 59'	Attendance: 1,100

1 August 1980 Edi Naegeli memorial tournament (Semi-Final)	FC Zürich (Switzerland)	1–3	(West Germany) Eintracht Frankfurt	Zurich, Switzerland
16:30 CEST	Seiler 79'	(Report)	Pezzey 31'; Körbel 61'; Lottermann 88'	Stadium: Letzigrund; Attendance: 3,500; Referee: Heinis

2 August 1980 Edi Naegeli memorial tournament (Final)	Grasshopper Club Zürich (Switzerland)	1–2	(West Germany) Eintracht Frankfurt	Zurich, Switzerland
20:30 CEST	Pfister 18'	(Report)	Cha Bum-kun 15', 54'	Stadium: Letzigrund; Attendance: 3,000; Referee: Renggli

6 August 1980	SV Hattersheim (West Germany)	0–8	(West Germany) Eintracht Frankfurt
		(Report)	Borchers 32'; Schaub 88'; Hinz (o.g.); Blättel 72'; Cha Bum-kun 63'	Attendance: 4,500

7 August 1980	VfL Oberbieber (West Germany)	0–15	(West Germany) Eintracht Frankfurt	Neuwied, West Germany
		(Report)	Hölzenbein; Cha Bum-kun; Lottermann; Gruber; Schaub; Borchers; Pezzey; Körbel	Attendance: 2,000

9 August 1980	Rapid Wien (Austria)	2–1	(West Germany) Eintracht Frankfurt	Vienna, Austria
	Keglevits 4'; Veselý 76'	(Report)	Gruber 83'	Attendance: 5,500; Referee: Matthias

10 August 1980	FVgg Kastel (West Germany)	1–6	(West Germany) Eintracht Frankfurt	Mainz-Kastel, West Germany
	Konrad 56'	(Report)	Cha Bum-kun 7', 53'; Pezzey 21', 30'; Blättel 60', 82'	Attendance: 2,800; Referee: Birlenbach

26 August 1980	Rödermark XI (West Germany)	1–12	(West Germany) Eintracht Frankfurt	Rödermark, West Germany
18:30 CEST	Witzel 53'	(Report)	Lorant 7', 63' (pen.), 76'; Nachtweih 19'; Hönnscheidt 24', 60', 81'; Lottermann 27'; Hölzenbein 34'; Schaub 51'; Blättel 79', 83'	Stadium: Sportplatz der Turngemeinde; Attendance: 2,500; Referee: Baierer

9 September 1980	1. FC Eschborn (West Germany)	1–11	(West Germany) Eintracht Frankfurt
	Henrich 75' (pen.)	(Report)	Hölzenbein 7', 18'; Nachtweih 16', 22'; Trapp 36'; Borchers 43'; Blättel 50'; Schaub 52', 58'; Hönnscheidt 68', 87'	Attendance: 2,000; Referee: Kohn

7 October 1980	Belgium	4–2	(West Germany) Eintracht Frankfurt	Brussels, Belgium
	Vandenbergh 40', 69'; Mommens 60'; Ceulemans 89'	(Report)	Nachtweih 45'; Lottermann 72'	Stadium: Stade du Heysel; Attendance: 3,000

8 October 1980	SKV Büttelborn (West Germany)	0–7	(West Germany) Eintracht Frankfurt
		(Report)	Hölzenbein 7', 18'; Nachtweih 15'; Borchers 28'; Hönnscheidt 38'; Lorant 47' (pen.), 67'	Attendance: 1,000; Referee: Knierim

11 October 1980	SKG Frankfurt (West Germany)	0–8	(West Germany) Eintracht Frankfurt	Frankfurt, West Germany
		(Report)	Nachtweih 6', 87'; Pezzey 10'; Trapp 42'; Neuberger 57'; Hönnscheidt 72'; Gruber 82'; Hölzenbein 89'	Stadium: Sportplatz an der Hahnstraße; Attendance: 800; Referee: Storck

28 October 1980	Al-Masry SC (Egypt)	2–1	(West Germany) Eintracht Frankfurt	Port Said, Egypt
	Gamal Gouda 14'; Salah 82'	(Report)	Lorant 26' (pen.)	Attendance: 6,000

12 November 1980	Eintracht Frankfurt (West Germany)	6–4	West Germany 1974 World Cup Team	Frankfurt, West Germany
20:00 CEST	Nickel 12'; Karger 19', 24', 30'; Hölzenbein 48', 67'	(Report)	Grabowski 5'; Hölzenbein 42'; Heynckes 74', 75'	Stadium: Waldstadion; Attendance: 45,000; Referee: Eschweiler

3 January 1981	AS Cannes (France)	0–1	(West Germany) Eintracht Frankfurt	Cannes, France
		(Report)	Pezzey 75'	Attendance: 3,000; Referee: Benali

4 January 1981	OGC Nice (France)	6–5 (a.e.t.) (4–3 p)	(West Germany) Eintracht Frankfurt	Cannes, France
	Bravo 67'; Gentili 76'	(Report)	Werner Lorant (10.); Bernd Nickel (45.)	Attendance: 5,000; Referee: Benali
	Penalties
	(penalty scored) Struth; (penalty scored) Trenkel; (penalty scored) Groß; (penalty scored) Becker; (penalty scored) Harforth		(penalty scored) Pezzey; (penalty scored) Trapp; (penalty scored) Körbel; (penalty missed) Lorant; (penalty missed) Nickel

9 January 1981	FC Nantes (France)	3–2	(West Germany) Eintracht Frankfurt	Lorient, France
	Rampillon 15', 71'; Bibard 82'	(Report)	Cha Bum-kun 36'; Nachtweih 42'	Attendance: 8,000; Referee: Femenia

24 January 1981	Eintracht Frankfurt (West Germany)	5–0	(West Germany) Eintracht Frankfurt Amateure	Frankfurt, West Germany
10:30 CEST	Borchers 36'; Nickel 39'; Mintgen 44' (o.g.); Pezzey 49'; Cha Bum-kun 62'	(Report)		Stadium: Waldstadion; Attendance: 150

21 April 1981	Viktoria Sindlingen (West Germany)	0–5	(West Germany) Eintracht Frankfurt	Frankfurt, West Germany
		(Report)	Hölzenbein 25'; Borchers 27'; Nickel 31'; Cha Bum-kun 37', 53'	Attendance: 1,500; Referee: Willbuck

11 May 1981	Rheingau XI (West Germany)	1–8	(West Germany) Eintracht Frankfurt	Geisenheim, West Germany
	Harry Schmid (20.)	(Report)	Borchers 28'; Cha Bum-kun 43', 72'; Pezzey 61'; Lorant 63'; Blättel 70'; Nickel 77'; Lottermann 89'	Stadium: Rheingau-Stadion; Attendance: 3,800; Referee: Birlenbach

12 May 1981	FV 09 Eschersheim (West Germany)	1–9	(West Germany) Eintracht Frankfurt	Frankfurt, West Germany
19:00 CEST	Jovanovski 16'	(Report)	Nachtweih 15', 87'; Caspary 21'; Lottermann 31', 82', 90'; Lorant 62'; Künast 85', 88'	Stadium: Sportplatz Berkersheimer Weg; Attendance: 2,500; Referee: Schneider

17 May 1981	Walldorf XI (West Germany)	1–9	(West Germany) Eintracht Frankfurt
	Kornhuber 81'	(Report)	Trapp 3', 26'; Lottermann 37'; Lorant 38'; Nachtweih 58'; Pezzey 63'; Cha Bum-kun 76', 78', 80'	Attendance: 2,500; Referee: Nischwitz

21 May 1981	SG Sossenheim (West Germany)	0–20	(West Germany) Eintracht Frankfurt
18:45 CEST		(Report)	Cha Bum-kun; Nickel; Pezzey; Plattek; Lottermann; Caspary; Zick; Trapp	Attendance: 2,000; Referee: Dork

24 May 1981	South China AA (Hong Kong)	0–1	(West Germany) Eintracht Frankfurt	Hong Kong, United Kingdom
		(Report)	Blättel 48'	Attendance: 20,000; Referee: Wang

31 May 1981	VfB Schrecksbach (West Germany)	2–7	(West Germany) Eintracht Frankfurt
		(Report)	Nachtweih; Künast; Nickel; Blättel; Trapp; Borchers; Cha Bum-kun	Attendance: 2,000

1 June 1981	SV Zeilsheim (West Germany)	1–14	(West Germany) Eintracht Frankfurt
	Feigl 14'	(Report)	Nickel 1', 56', 68', 71', 79', 87'; Zick 24'; Borchers 36'; Körbel 37'; Nachtweih 43'; Lorant 53', 82'; Caspery 54', 72'	Attendance: 2,500; Referee: Dörk

9 June 1981	Oberursel XI (West Germany)	2–13	(West Germany) Eintracht Frankfurt	Oberursel, West Germany
		(Report)	Borchers; Nickel; Nachtweih; Pezzey; Neuberger; Falkenmayer; Funk (pen.); Künast; Caspary	Attendance: 2,500; Referee: Gebauer

14 June 1981	TSV Ostheim (West Germany)	2–8	(West Germany) Eintracht Frankfurt	Ostheim, West Germany
	Gramm (38.); Matthias Helm (79.)	(Report)	Nickel 5', 68'; Trapp 36'; Borchers 43'; Blättel 47'; Lorant 51', 67'; 89' (o.g.)	Attendance: 2,800; Referee: Trenk

=== Bundesliga ===
==== League fixtures and results ====
16 August 1980 1	Schalke 04	1–4	Eintracht Frankfurt	Gelsenkirchen, West Germany
15:30 CEST	Džoni 31'	(Report)	Nachtweih 28'; Lorant 32'; Hölzenbein 43'; Borchers 77'	Stadium: Parkstadion; Attendance: 25,000; Referee: Horstmann

19 August 1980 2	Eintracht Frankfurt	2–0	Arminia Bielefeld	Frankfurt, West Germany
15:30 CEST	Cha Bum-kun 19', 29'	(Report)		Stadium: Waldstadion; Attendance: 25,000; Referee: Föckler

23 August 1980 3	Bayer Leverkusen	3–2	Eintracht Frankfurt	Leverkusen, West Germany
15:30 CEST	Økland 23'; Herzog 60'; Demuth 84' (pen.)	(Report)	Nickel 77'; Nachtweih 87'	Stadium: Ulrich-Haberland-Stadion; Attendance: 11,000; Referee: Ohmsen

3 September 1980 4	Eintracht Frankfurt	2–1	VfB Stuttgart	Frankfurt, West Germany
20:00 CEST	Lottermann 36'; Schaub 51'	(Report)	Klotz 90'	Stadium: Waldstadion; Attendance: 40,000; Referee: Risse

6 September 1980 5	Hamburger SV	3–1	Eintracht Frankfurt	Hamburg, West Germany
15:30 CEST	Kaltz 17' (pen.); Reimann 45'; Hrubesch 73'	(Report)	Lorant 27'	Stadium: Volksparkstadion; Attendance: 35,000; Referee: Ahlenfelder

13 September 1980 6	Eintracht Frankfurt	2–1	1860 Munich	Frankfurt, West Germany
15:30 CEST	Pezzey 87'; Hölzenbein 88'	(Report)	Năstase 67'	Stadium: Waldstadion; Attendance: 15,000; Referee: Schmoock

20 September 1980 7	VfL Bochum	2–0	Eintracht Frankfurt	Bochum, West Germany
15:30 CEST	Gross 50'; Abel 57' (pen.)	(Report)		Stadium: Ruhrstadion; Attendance: 26,000; Referee: Retzmann

27 September 1980 8	Eintracht Frankfurt	2–1	MSV Duisburg	Frankfurt, West Germany
15:30 CEST	Nachtweih 45'; Hölzenbein 86' (pen.)	(Report)	Kempe 37'	Stadium: Waldstadion; Attendance: 15,000; Referee: Schmidhuber

15 October 1980 9	1. FC Nürnberg	1–4	Eintracht Frankfurt	Nuremberg, West Germany
20:00 CEST	Heck 66'	(Report)	Hölzenbein 37', 84'; Lottermann 57', 70'	Stadium: Städtisches Stadion; Attendance: 40,000; Referee: Hennig

18 October 1980 10	Eintracht Frankfurt	3–2	1. FC Kaiserslautern	Frankfurt, West Germany
15:30 CEST	Pezzey 46'; Lottermann 53'; Cha Bum-kun 56'	(Report)	Geye 3'; Neues 82'	Stadium: Waldstadion; Attendance: 37,000; Referee: Stäglich

25 October 1980 11	1. FC Köln	5–0	Eintracht Frankfurt	Cologne, West Germany
15:30 CEST	Gerber 9'; Woodcock 11'; Littbarski 44'; Botteron 53', 75'	(Report)		Stadium: Müngersdorfer Stadion; Attendance: 15,000; Referee: Redelfs

1 November 1980 12	Eintracht Frankfurt	3–3	Karlsruher SC	Frankfurt, West Germany
15:30 CEST	Pezzey 78', 90'; Hölzenbein 80'	(Report)	Krauth 44', 60'; Schüler 89'	Stadium: Waldstadion; Attendance: 16,000; Referee: Ross

8 November 1980 13	Eintracht Frankfurt	2–1	Borussia Mönchengladbach	Frankfurt, West Germany
15:30 CEST	Borchers 41'; Lottermann 46'	(Report)	Nielsen 54'	Stadium: Waldstadion; Attendance: 18,000; Referee: Hontheim

15 November 1980 14	Bayer Uerdingen	4–1	Eintracht Frankfurt	Krefeld, West Germany
15:30 CEST	Hofmann 5'; Raschid 6' (pen.), 87'; Zimmer 49'	(Report)	Neuberger 20'	Stadium: Grotenburg-Stadion; Attendance: 8,000; Referee: Roth

29 November 1980 15	Eintracht Frankfurt	0–0	Bayern Munich	Frankfurt, West Germany
15:30 CEST		(Report)		Stadium: Waldstadion; Attendance: 59,000; Referee: Walz

6 December 1980 16	Borussia Dortmund	2–1	Eintracht Frankfurt	Dortmund, West Germany
15:30 CEST	Burgsmüller 20'; Abramczik 48'	(Report)	Bernd Hölzenbein 80'	Stadium: Westfalenstadion; Attendance: 20,000; Referee: Luca

13 December 1980 17	Eintracht Frankfurt	2–2	Fortuna Düsseldorf	Frankfurt, West Germany
15:30 CEST	Pezzey 70'; Hölzenbein 81' (pen.)	(Report)	K Allofs 52', 89'	Stadium: Waldstadion; Attendance: 8,000; Referee: Gabor

27 January 1981 18	Eintracht Frankfurt	5–0	Schalke 04	Frankfurt, West Germany
20:00 CEST	Nickel 19'; Lorant 42' (pen.), 72' (pen.); Cha Bum-kun 84'; Nachtweih 89'	(Report)		Stadium: Waldstadion; Attendance: 9,500; Referee: Kasperowski

3 February 1981 19	Arminia Bielefeld	1–1	Eintracht Frankfurt	Bielefeld, West Germany
20:00 CEST	Schock 76'	(Report)	Nickel 4'	Stadium: Bielefelder Alm; Attendance: 16,000; Referee: Linn

7 February 1981 20	Eintracht Frankfurt	2–0	Bayer Leverkusen	Frankfurt, West Germany
15:30 CEST	Nickel 20', 23'	(Report)		Stadium: Waldstadion; Attendance: 10,000; Referee: Niebergall

14 February 1981 21	VfB Stuttgart	1–1	Eintracht Frankfurt	Stuttgart, West Germany
15:30 CEST	Allgöwer 19'	(Report)	Lottermann 53'	Stadium: Neckarstadion; Attendance: 27,000; Referee: Pauly

21 February 1981 22	Eintracht Frankfurt	1–1	Hamburger SV	Frankfurt, West Germany
15:30 CEST	Hölzenbein 47'	(Report)	Kaltz 83' (pen.)	Stadium: Waldstadion; Attendance: 40,000; Referee: Assenmacher

7 March 1981 23	1860 Munich	0–2	Eintracht Frankfurt	Munich, West Germany
15:30 CEST		(Report)	Nickel 41', 65'	Stadium: Olympiastadion; Attendance: 28,000; Referee: Stäglich

14 March 1981 24	Eintracht Frankfurt	2–2	VfL Bochum	Frankfurt, West Germany
15:30 CEST	Cha Bum-kun 5'; Pezzey 34'	(Report)	Pinkall 27', 46'	Stadium: Waldstadion; Attendance: 12,000; Referee: Horstmann

21 March 1981 25	MSV Duisburg	0–0	Eintracht Frankfurt	Duisburg, West Germany
15:30 CEST		(Report)		Stadium: Wedaustadion; Attendance: 10,000; Referee: Föckler

28 March 1981 26	Eintracht Frankfurt	3–0	1. FC Nürnberg	Frankfurt, West Germany
15:30 CEST	Pezzey 14'; Cha Bum-kun 15', 64'	(Report)		Stadium: Waldstadion; Attendance: 16,000; Referee: Retzmann

11 April 1981 28	Eintracht Frankfurt	4–0	1. FC Köln	Frankfurt, West Germany
15:30 CEST	Pezzey 42'; Nachtweih 45'; Hölzenbein 61', 65' (pen.)	(Report)		Stadium: Waldstadion; Attendance: 22,000; Referee: Roth

14 April 1981 27	1. FC Kaiserslautern	2–0	Eintracht Frankfurt	Kaiserslautern, West Germany
20:00 CEST	Hofeditz 78'; Briegel 85' (pen.)	(Report)		Stadium: Betzenbergstadion; Attendance: 30,000; Referee: Waltert

18 April 1981 29	Karlsruher SC	1–1	Eintracht Frankfurt	Karlsruhe, West Germany
15:30 CEST	Bold 70'	(Report)	Nickel 18'	Stadium: Wildparkstadion; Attendance: 23,000; Referee: Ahlenfelder

8 May 1981 30	Borussia Mönchengladbach	2–2	Eintracht Frankfurt	Mönchengladbach, West Germany
20:00 CEST	Loontiens 51'; Bruns 74'	(Report)	Nachtweih 28'; Pezzey 31'	Stadium: Bökelbergstadion; Attendance: 15,500; Referee: Redelfs

16 May 1981 31	Eintracht Frankfurt	2–2	Bayer Uerdingen	Frankfurt, West Germany
15:30 CEST	Gruber 6'; Lorant 73' (pen.)	(Report)	Hofmann 24', 86'	Stadium: Waldstadion; Attendance: 10,000; Referee: Horeis

30 May 1981 32	Bayern Munich	7–2	Eintracht Frankfurt	Munich, West Germany
15:30 CEST	Kraus 54'; Breitner 60' (pen.), 64', 85'; Rummenigge 77' (pen.), 80'; Hoeneß 90'	(Report)	Borchers 81'; Cha Bum-kun 86'	Stadium: Olympiastadion; Attendance: 48,000; Referee: Eschweiler

6 June 1981 33	Eintracht Frankfurt	0–4	Borussia Dortmund	Frankfurt, West Germany
15:30 CEST		(Report)	Schneider 12'; Eðvaldsson 14'; Abramczik 17'; Wagner 31'	Stadium: Waldstadion; Attendance: 13,000; Referee: Ross

13 June 1981 34	Fortuna Düsseldorf	2–2	Eintracht Frankfurt	Düsseldorf, West Germany
15:30 CEST	Nachtweih 2'; Pezzey 48'	(Report)	Schmitz 18', 58'	Stadium: Rheinstadion; Attendance: 20,000; Referee: Linn

==== League table ====
Pos	Team	Pld	W	D	L	GF	GA	GD	Pts	Qualification or relegation
3	VfB Stuttgart	34	19	8	7	70	44	+26	46	Qualification to UEFA Cup first round (Note: As Eintracht Frankfurt qualified for the Cup Winners' Cup, their UEFA Cup spot was transferred to Mönchengladbach.)
4	1. FC Kaiserslautern	34	17	10	7	60	37	+23	44	Qualification to UEFA Cup first round
5	Eintracht Frankfurt	34	13	12	9	61	57	+4	38	Qualification to Cup Winners' Cup first round
6	Borussia Mönchengladbach	34	15	7	12	68	64	+4	37	Qualification to UEFA Cup first round
7	Borussia Dortmund	34	13	9	12	69	59	+10	35	

Source: www.dfb.de
Rules for classification: 1) points; 2) goal difference; 3) number of goals scored.

=== DFB-Pokal ===
30 August 1980 1st Round	VfB Gaggenau	0–3	Eintracht Frankfurt	Gaggenau, West Germany
15:30 CEST		(Report)	Hölzenbein 14'; Hönnscheidt 44'; Lorant 49'	Stadium: Traischbachstadion; Attendance: 4,500; Referee: Schraivogel

22 October 1980 2nd Round	Eintracht Frankfurt	6–0	VfB Friedrichshafen	Frankfurt, West Germany
	Nachtweih 31'; Lottermann 31', 73'; Cha Bum-kun 41', 79'; Blättel 86'	(Report)		Stadium: Waldstadion; Attendance: 2,500; Referee: Dölfel

22 November 1980 3rd Round	Eintracht Frankfurt	3–0	SSV Ulm 1846	Frankfurt, West Germany
15:30 CEST	Hölzenbein 22' (pen.); Lottermann 54'; Borchers 73'	(Report)		Stadium: Waldstadion; Attendance: 2,000; Referee: Aulenbacher

31 January 1981 4th Round	VfB Oldenburg	4–5	Eintracht Frankfurt	Oldenburg, West Germany
	Peter Darsow 27' (pen.); Wilfried Klinge 38'; Wilfried Osterkamp 75'; Reinhold Specht 89'	(Report)	Lorant 8', 37'; Cha Bum-kun 34', 62'; Pezzey 54'	Stadium: Marschweg-Stadion; Attendance: 22,000; Referee: Eschweiler

28 February 1981 Quarter-finals	Eintracht Frankfurt	2–1	VfB Stuttgart	Frankfurt, West Germany
	Trapp 67'; Pezzey 90'	(Report)	Allgöwer 32'	Stadium: Waldstadion; Attendance: 26,000; Referee: Hennig

4 April 1981 Semi-finals	Eintracht Frankfurt	1–0	Hertha BSC	Frankfurt, West Germany
	Cha Bum-kun 30'	(Report)		Stadium: Waldstadion; Attendance: 26,000; Referee: Heitmann

==== Final ====
2 May 1981
16:00 CEST

Eintracht Frankfurt	3–1	1. FC Kaiserslautern
Neuberger 38'; Borchers 40'; Cha 64'	Report	Geye 90'

Neckarstadion, Stuttgart
Attendance: 71,000
Referee: Horst Joos (Stuttgart)

=== UEFA Cup ===
17 September 1980 1st Round	Shakhtar Donetsk (Soviet Union)	1–0	(West Germany) Eintracht Frankfurt	Donetsk, Soviet Union
	Starukhin 22' (pen.)	(Report)		Stadium: Shakhtar Stadium; Attendance: 46,000; Referee: Courtney

1 October 1980 1st Round	Eintracht Frankfurt (West Germany)	3–0	(Soviet Union) Shakhtar Donetsk	Frankfurt, West Germany
	Hölzenbein 4'; Cha Bum-kun 38', 70'	(Report)		Stadium: Waldstadion; Attendance: 25,000; Referee: Garcia Carrion

22 October 1980 2nd Round	FC Utrecht (Netherlands)	2–1	(West Germany) Eintracht Frankfurt	Utrecht, Netherlands
	Carbo 59' de Kruyk 90' (pen.)	(Report)	Borchers 32'	Stadium: Stadion Galgenwaard; Attendance: 25,000; Referee: Galler

5 November 1980 2nd Round	Eintracht Frankfurt (West Germany)	3–1	(Netherlands) FC Utrecht	Frankfurt, West Germany
	Karger 52'; Nachtweih 58'; Pezzey 74'	(Report)	Neuberger 48' (o.g.)	Stadium: Waldstadion; Attendance: 18,000; Referee: Krnach

26 November 1980 3rd Round	Eintracht Frankfurt (West Germany)	4–2	(France) FC Sochaux	Frankfurt, West Germany
20:00 CEST	Neuberger 2'; Borchers 43'; Hölzenbein 52'; Nachtweih 61'	(Report)	Genghini 72'; Ruty 88'	Stadium: Waldstadion; Attendance: 15,000; Referee: Dotchev

10 December 1980 3rd Round	FC Sochaux (France)	2–0	(West Germany) Eintracht Frankfurt	Montbéliard, France
	Genghini 17'; Revelli 44'	(Report)		Stadium: Stade Auguste Bonal; Attendance: 12,000; Referee: van Langenhove

== Squad ==
=== Squad and statistics ===
No.	Pos	Nat	Player	Total		Bundesliga		DFB-Pokal		UEFA Cup	
No.	Pos	Nat	Player	Apps	Goals	Apps	Goals	Apps	Goals	Apps	Goals
	GK	(West Germany) FRG	Klaus Funk	14	0	9	0	1	0	4	0
	GK	(West Germany) FRG	Joachim Jüriens	3	0	3	0	0	0	0	0
	GK	(East Germany) GDR	Jürgen Pahl	32	0	23	0	6	0	3	0
	DF	(West Germany) FRG	Rigobert Gruber	12	1	9	1	2	0	1	0
	DF	(West Germany) FRG	Charly Körbel	43	0	30	0	7	0	6	0
	DF	(West Germany) FRG	Willi Neuberger	47	3	34	1	7	1	6	1
	DF	(Austria) AUT	Bruno Pezzey	43	13	31	10	7	2	5	1
	DF	(West Germany) FRG	Michael Sziedat	39	0	27	0	6	0	6	0
	DF	(West Germany) FRG	Wolfgang Trapp	23	1	19	0	2	1	2	0
	DF	(West Germany) FRG	Claus-Peter Zick	1	0	1	0	0	0	0	0
	MF	(West Germany) FRG	Michael Blättel	16	1	12	0	2	1	2	0
	MF	(West Germany) FRG	Ralf Falkenmayer	2	0	2	0	0	0	0	0
	MF	(West Germany) FRG	Bernd Hölzenbein	40	15	27	11	7	2	6	2
	MF	(West Germany) FRG	Werner Lorant	44	8	32	5	6	3	6	0
	MF	(West Germany) FRG	Stefan Lottermann	42	9	32	6	5	3	5	0
	MF	(East Germany) GDR	Norbert Nachtweih	42	10	30	7	7	1	5	2
	MF	(West Germany) FRG	Bernd Nickel	33	8	23	8	6	0	4	0
	FW	(West Germany) FRG	Ronny Borchers	45	7	34	3	5	2	6	2
	FW	(South Korea) KOR	Cha Bum-kun	38	16	27	8	6	6	5	2
	FW	(West Germany) FRG	Norbert Hönnscheidt	7	1	5	0	1	1	1	0
	FW	(West Germany) FRG	Harald Karger	4	1	3	0	0	0	1	1
	FW	(West Germany) FRG	Michael Künast	2	0	2	0	0	0	0	0
	FW	(West Germany) FRG	Fred Schaub	8	1	5	1	2	0	1	0

== Sources ==
- Matheja, Ulrich (2011). Unsere Eintracht - Eintracht Frankfurt - Die Chronik. Die Werkstatt. ISBN 978-3-89533-750-5.
