= Albert Rust (footballer) =

French footballer and coach (born 1953)

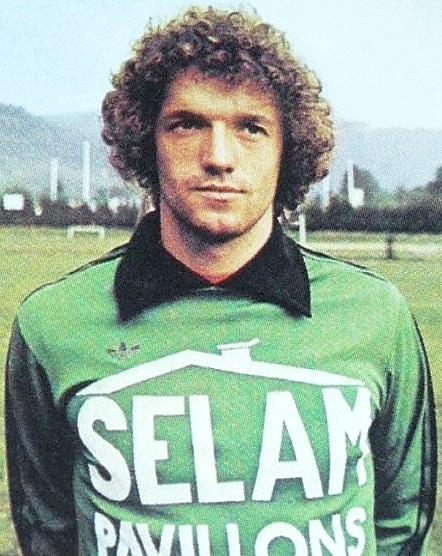
- Rust in 1978

Personal information
- Full name: Albert Marcel Henri Rust
- Date of birth: 10 October 1953 (age 73)
- Place of birth: Mulhouse, Haut-Rhin, France
- Height: 1.82 m (6 ft 0 in)
- Position: Goalkeeper

Senior career*
Years	Team	Apps	(Gls)
1972–1987	Sochaux	367	(0)
1987–1990	Montpellier	113	(0)
1990–1991	Monaco	0	(0)
Total		480	(0)

International career
1986	France	1	(0)

Managerial career
- 1991–1993: Le Crès
- 1995–1999: Chamois Niortais FC
- 2000–2001: Clermont
- 2002: Stade Tunisien
- 2002–2003: FC Sète
- 2003–2006: Brest
- 2006: US Créteil-Lusitanos
Medal record
Men's football
Representing France
UEFA European Championship
Winner	1984
CONMEBOL–UEFA Cup of Champions
Winner	1985
Olympic Games
Gold medal – first place	1984	Team competition
- * Club domestic league appearances and goals

Albert Marcel Henri Rust (born 10 October 1953) is a French former professional footballer who played as a goalkeeper. He later became a coach.

Rust spent most of his career at Sochaux Football Club, he is the most capped player in history of the club, with 455 games played. He then played for Montpellier HSC with whom he won the Coupe de France in 1990.

For the national team, he won the 1984 Olympic games with the French Olympic team. He was called up to the France National team numerous times, with whom he won the European Championship in 1984 and finished third in the World Cup in 1986.

Becoming a coach, he worked for Chamois Niortais and Stade Brestois.

== Early life ==
Albert Marcel Henri Rust was born on 10 October 1953 in the city of Mulhouse in the department of Haut-Rhin in France.

== Club career ==
Formed in the local club in Wittelsheim, Rust evolved as a defender in his early years before opting for the goalkeeper position. At age 19, he rejoined FC Sochaux, a club known for its training center, and relatively quick accomplishment of its first team; they demonstrated an unspectacular but safe and steady style. He quickly took over the first choice goalkeeper position from Eugène Battmann and became the title holder during the 1975-1976 season. After his good performances, he was called upon by Henri Guérin of the team France A' 27 March 1976 against Luxembourg.

The following season, he knew there would be tough competition with another promising goalkeeper, Joël Bats coming up. The coach René Hauss opted for an original solution and alternated his goalkeepers every game to release a hierarchy. The situation unraveled with the departure of Bats to AJ Auxerre in 1979. Later, Rust and Bats agreed that this was the most painful time in their professional careers.

Rust had his best years at the club with "The Golden Generation" of Sochaux F.C. in 1979-1983. With Bernard Genghini, Yannick Stopyra, Philippe Anziani and Abdel Djaadaoui, the team played good attacking football and focused on their journey in the UEFA Cup of 1980-81. They reached the semi-finals after winning in the third round against Eintracht Frankfurt, a game in which they came up from a deficit of 2-0 to win 4-2 on aggregate, in the snow, thanks to Patrick Revelli. The same year these players also played the final of the Coupe des Alpes and lost to FC Basel in the Final.

Rust's club's good form could not be matched at the National level by the France National team. The national team lacked the skill that the team possessed in 1982. Taking advantage of the Olympic football tournament rule change which opened the tournament up to five professionals of any age per team, Rust joined the French Olympic team for qualification to the 1984 Games in Los Angeles, alongside François Brisson, Daniel Xuereb, and Dominique Bijotat. They ultimately won and were awarded the gold medal on the top step of the podium at the Rose Bowl in Pasadena, after a victory in the final against Brazil (2-0).

After demonstrating good form during the Olympic qualifications, Rust was named in the list of 20 for the UEFA Euro 1984 just before the Olympic Games. He was second choice to Joël Bats. Rust then won national number 2 behind his old rival club and was, naturally, selected for the 1986 FIFA World Cup in Mexico. In 1987, he left his club and signed with newly promoted Montpellier. He then won a Coupe de France with them in 1990. Rust finally hung up his boots at 38 years after a "freelance" year in AS Monaco. He played over 500 first division matches.

== International career ==
He won one international cap for the France national team during the 1980s. After having won the gold medal at the 1984 Summer Olympics in Los Angeles, California and Euro 84, he was a member of the French team in the 1986 FIFA World Cup, where he played his sole international match against Belgium on 28 June.

== Coaching career ==
After his playing career, he became a coach with several Ligue 2 and Championnat National sides. On 14 June 2010 the former US Créteil and Stade Brestois head coach signed for AS Saint-Etienne as goalkeeper coach. Rust immediately moved on to a coaching career with several league 2 teams, after that he coached Internationally as the Assistant Coach to Henry Michel (Saudi Arabia, Tunisia). He then went back to coaching in the National League (League 2) with the Stade Brestois for three seasons. He led the National Club in D2. In May 2006, he took over coaching for the team Créteil in League 2 but was dismissed by the Club on 18 September following a poor start to the 2006-07 season and was replaced by Artur Jorge. Albert Rust, graduate of DEPF, was selected by Roland Romeyer to fill the Assistant Coach position of l'AS Saint-Étienne as the Keeper trainer in the 2010-11 season. For non-sport related reasons, Albert Rust was dismissed of his duties as a goalie trainer following his 2-year contract extension with the Club.

== Career as a coach ==
- 1991-1993 : Le Crès
- 1993-1994 : AS Beauvais (assistant coach)
- 1994-1995 : Al-Nasr (assistant coach of Henri Michel)
- 1995-1999 : Chamois Niortais FC
- 2000-2001 : Clermont Foot
- 2001-2002 : Tunisia (assistant coach of Henri Michel)
- 2002 : Stade Tunisien (Tunisia)
- 2002-2003 : FC Sète
- 2003-2006 : Stade Brestois
- 2006-2007 : US Créteil

== Honours ==
Montpellier

- Coupe de France: 1989–90

France

- UEFA European Championship: 1984

Orders

- Knight of the Legion of Honour: 2026
