= Frédéric N'Doumbé =

Cameroonian footballer (1935–1978)

Personal information
- Full name: Frédéric N'Doumbé Mondo
- Date of birth: 9 January 1935
- Place of birth: Douala, French Cameroon
- Date of death: December 1978 (aged 43)
- Place of death: Douala, Cameroon
- Height: 1.65 m (5 ft 5 in)
- Position: Left winger

Senior career*
Years	Team	Apps	(Gls)
–1957	Caïman Douala		
1957–1960	Le Havre	87	(17)
1960–1963	Montpellier	107	(23)
1964–1969	Saint-Étienne	106	(7)
1970–1971	Le Havre	10	(2)
Total		310+	(49+)
- * Club domestic league appearances and goals

Frédéric N'Doumbé Mondo (9 January 1935 – December 1978) was a Cameroonian footballer who played as a left winger.

== Career ==
N'Doumbé began his career in Cameroon with Caïman Douala, before joining Le Havre in 1957. In the final of the 1958–59 Coupe de France, N'Doumbé scored Le Havre's second goal in the 3–0 replay win against Sochaux.

In January 1964, he joined Saint-Étienne, where he won four French Division 1 titles. He scored a total of seven goals for Saint-Étienne, with all of them occurring at the Stade Geoffroy-Guichard.

== Personal life and death ==
N'Doumbé died in December 1978, aged 43, after a car accident in Douala. His daughter Norma Ray (born Sylvie N'Doumbé) is a French singer and songwriter.

== Honours ==
Le Havre

- French Division 2: 1958–59
- Coupe de France: 1958–59

Montpellier

- French Division 2: 1960–61

Saint-Étienne

- French Division 1: 1963–64, 1966–67, 1967–68, 1968–69
