= Serge Bourdoncle =

French footballer (1936–2020)

Personal information
- Date of birth: 24 January 1936
- Place of birth: Milhars, France
- Date of death: 10 October 2020 (aged 84)
- Height: 1.67 m (5 ft 6 in)
- Position: Midfielder

Youth career
- 1952–1953: Sochaux

Senior career*
Years	Team	Apps	(Gls)
1953–1960	Sochaux	112	(19)
1960	Nîmes	13	(4)
1960–1961	Bordeaux	12	(4)
1961–1962	Nîmes	13	(4)
1962–1965	Sochaux	80	(22)
1965–1967	Franc-Comtois	59	(10)
1967–1968	Metz	15	(1)
Total		304	(64)

Managerial career
- 1969–1970: Algrange
- * Club domestic league appearances and goals

Serge Bourdoncle (24 January 1936 – 10 October 2020) was a French football player and coach.

== Career ==
Born in Milhars, Bourdoncle played as a midfielder for Sochaux, Nîmes, Bordeaux, Franc-Comtois and Metz. With Sochaux he was runner-up in the 1959 Coupe de France, and the winner of the Coupe Charles Drago in 1963 and 1964.

He later became a coach, managing Algrange.

== Honours ==
Sochaux

- Coupe de France runner-up: 1959
- Coupe Charles Drago: 1963, 1964
