= Alfred Dambach =

French footballer

Personal information
- Date of birth: 22 September 1918
- Place of birth: Strasbourg, France
- Date of death: 19 November 1960 (aged 42)
- Place of death: Darnétal, France
- Height: 1.84 m (6 ft 0 in)
- Position: Goalkeeper

Youth career
- FC Neuhof

Senior career*
Years	Team	Apps	(Gls)
1937–1939	Strasbourg		
1939–1940	Stade cadurcien		
1940–1943	ESA Brive		
1943–1944	Reims-Champagne		
1944–1949	Rouen		
1949–1951	SM Caen		

International career
1944	France	1	(0)
- * Club domestic league appearances and goals

Alfred Dambach (22 September 1918 – 19 November 1960) was a French footballer who played as a goalkeeper for Strasbourg, Reims-Champagne and Rouen in the 1940s. He also made one appearance for the French national team in 1944.

== Club career ==
Born on 22 September 1918 in Strasbourg, Bas-Rhin, Dambach began his career at his hometown club RC Strasbourg in 1937, aged 19, where he remained for two seasons, until 1939. In total, he played 53 Ligue 1 matches for Strasbourg, making his official debut on 12 September 1937, Racing de Paris, and played his last game on 29 May 1939, against Olympique de Marseille, keeping a clean-sheet in both matches (3–0 and 1–0, respectively). After the outbreak of World War II, he joined Les Jeunes Cadourques, which later merged with Stade cadurcien. After one season there, he played three more at ESA Brive (1940–43), Dambach joined Reims-Champagne in 1943, and in his first (and only) season at the club, he helped his side reach the 1944 Coupe de France final, which ended in a 4–0 loss to Nancy-Lorraine.

In 1944, Dambach joined Rouen, remaining there for five seasons, until 1949, helping them win the 1944–45 French Football Championship. One of his autographed pictures from April 1949 was later displayed and sold at a high price. In 1949, he was signed by SM Caen, where he retired in 1950, aged 32. In total, he played 106 matches in Ligue 1.

== International career ==
On 24 December 1944, a few months after the Coupe de France final, Dambach earned his first (and only) international cap in France's first official match since March 1942, starting in a friendly match against Belgium at the Parc de Princes, and helping his side to a 3–1 win.

== Death ==
Dambach died in Darnétal on 19 November 1960, at the age of 42.

== See also ==
- List of RC Strasbourg Alsace players

== Honours ==
Reims-Champagne

- Ligue 1:
  - Champions (1): 1944

FC Rouen

- Coupe de France:
  - Champions (1): 1944–45
