= Norbert Hofmann =

Norbert Hofmann may refer to:

- Norbert Hofmann (footballer, born 1951), German footballer
- Norbert Hofmann (footballer, born 1972), German footballer
- Norbert Hofmann (sport shooter) (born 1963), German sports shooter
