= Sesia (disambiguation) =

Sesia may refer to:

- The river Sesia, in northwest Italy
- Sesia (département), a district during the First French Empire, named after the river
- Sesia, a genus of moths
- The Valsesia, the river’s valley
- Georges Sesia, French footballer
