= Dambach =

Dambach may refer to:

== Places ==
- Dambach, Bas-Rhin, France
- Dambach Colonia, a neighborhood of Managua, Nicaragua
- Dambach-la-Ville, Bas-Rhin, France
- Dambach, Germany, a municipality in Landkreis Birkenfeld, Rhineland-Palatinate

== People with the surname ==
- Alfred Dambach (1918–1960), French footballer
- Erica Dambach (born 1975), American women's soccer player and coach
