= André Strappe =

French footballer (1928–2006)

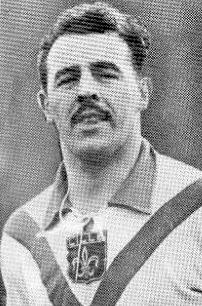
- Strappe in 1955

Personal information
- Full name: André Louis Strappe
- Date of birth: 23 February 1928
- Place of birth: Bully-les-Mines, Pas-de-Calais, France
- Date of death: 10 February 2006 (aged 77)
- Place of death: Le Havre, Seine-Maritime, France
- Position: Forward

Youth career
- 1945–1948: ES Bully

Senior career*
Years	Team	Apps	(Gls)
1948–1958	Lille	310	(110)
1958–1961	Le Havre	93	(26)
1961–1963	Nantes	49	(7)
1963–1965	Bastia		
1966–1970	Tavaux-Damparis		
1970–1971	Châteauroux	10	(2)
Total		465+	(145+)

International career
1948	France Olympic	2	(0)
1949–1954	France	23	(4)

Managerial career
- 1964–1965: Bastia
- 1966–1970: Tavaux-Damparis
- 1970–1971: Châteauroux
- * Club domestic league appearances and goals

André Louis Strappe (23 February 1928 – 10 February 2006) was a French professional footballer who played as a forward, and later served as a manager.

== Club career ==
Strappe was a player for Lille, Le Havre, and Nantes, and then a player-manager for Bastia, Tavaux-Damparis, and Châteauroux. He scored 112 goals in the French Division 1 and won the league tournament in 1953–54 with Lille. He also won the Coupe de France in 1953 and 1955 with Lille, and again with Le Havre in 1959.

== International career ==
Strappe also played 23 matches and scored 4 goals for France. He participated at the 1948 Summer Olympics and in the 1954 FIFA World Cup in Switzerland.

== Honours ==
Lille

- Division 1: 1953–54
- Coupe de France: 1952–53, 1954–55

Le Havre

- Division 2: 1958–59
- Coupe de France: 1958–59
- Challenge des Champions: 1959
