= Ignace Kowalczyk =

French-German footballer (1913-1996)

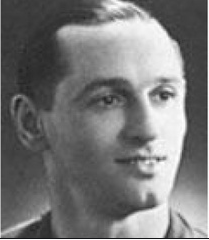

Personal information
- Date of birth: 29 December 1913
- Place of birth: Castrop, Germany
- Date of death: 27 March 1996 (aged 82)
- Position: Midfielder

Youth career
- 1930–1931: Noyelles sous Lens

Senior career*
Years	Team	Apps	(Gls)
1931–1933	Lens		
1933–1936	Valenciennes		
1936–1937	Marseille	29	(6)
1937–1939	Metz	22	(1)
1943–1944	Reims-Champagne		
1944–1945	Reims		
1945–1949	Metz	127	(3)

International career
1935–1938	France	5	(1)

Managerial career
- 1949–1950: Metz
- * Club domestic league appearances and goals

Ignace Kowalczyk (29 December 1913 – 27 March 1996) was a footballer. Born in Germany, Kowalczyk played for the France national team.

== Personal life ==
Born in Castrop, Kowalczyk was of Polish descent. He moved to France at a young age. He acquired French nationality by naturalization on 26 October 1934.
