= 1958–59 Coupe de France =

Tournament details
- Country: France

The Coupe de France's results of the 1958–59 season. Le Havre AC won the final played on May 3 and May 18, 1959, beating FC Sochaux-Montbéliard.

== Round of 16 ==
Team 1	Score	Team 2
Le Havre AC (D2)	2–0	SC Draguignan (CFA)
FC Metz (D2)	2–1	RC Besançon (D2)
FC Sochaux-Montbéliard (D1)	2–0	Angers SCO (D1)
Nîmes Olympique (D1)	4–0	Red Star (D2)
RC Paris (D1)	3–2	AS Saint-Étienne (D1)
Toulouse FC (D1)	1–1 (a.e.t.)	UA Sedan-Torcy (D1)
Stade Rennais (D1)	2–0	AS Troyes (D2)
Olympique Lyonnais (D1)	3–1	Stade de Reims (D1)
Replay
Toulouse FC (D1)	3–1	UA Sedan-Torcy (D1)

== Quarter-finals ==
Team 1	Score	Team 2
Le Havre AC (D2)	2–0	FC Metz (D2)
Nîmes Olympique (D1)	4–0	RC Paris (D1)
FC Sochaux-Montbéliard (D1)	2–1 (a.e.t.)	Toulouse FC (D1)
Stade Rennais (D1)	2–0	Olympique Lyonnais (D1)

== Semi-finals ==
12 April 1959

Le Havre AC (2)	1–0	Nîmes Olympique (1)
Strappe 43'	(Report)

Stade Olympique Yves-du-Manoir, Colombes

12 April 1959

FC Sochaux-Montbéliard (1)	2–1	Stade Rennais (1)
Brodd 17'; Stopyra 21'	(Report)	Méano 70'

Stade Henri Fouquès-Duparc, Oran

== Final ==
3 May 1959

Le Havre	2–2 (a.e.t.)	Sochaux
Ferrari 2'; Bouchache 113'		Eloy 45' (o.g.); Gardien 109'

Stade Olympique Yves-du-Manoir, Colombes
Attendance: 50,778
Referee: Jean-Louis Groppi

=== Replay ===
18 May 1959

Le Havre	3–0	Sochaux
Meyer 21'; N'Doumbé 31'; Navarro 87'

Stade Olympique Yves-du-Manoir, Colombes
Attendance: 36,655
Referee: Jean-Louis Groppi
