= Maxence Flachez =

French footballer (born 1972)

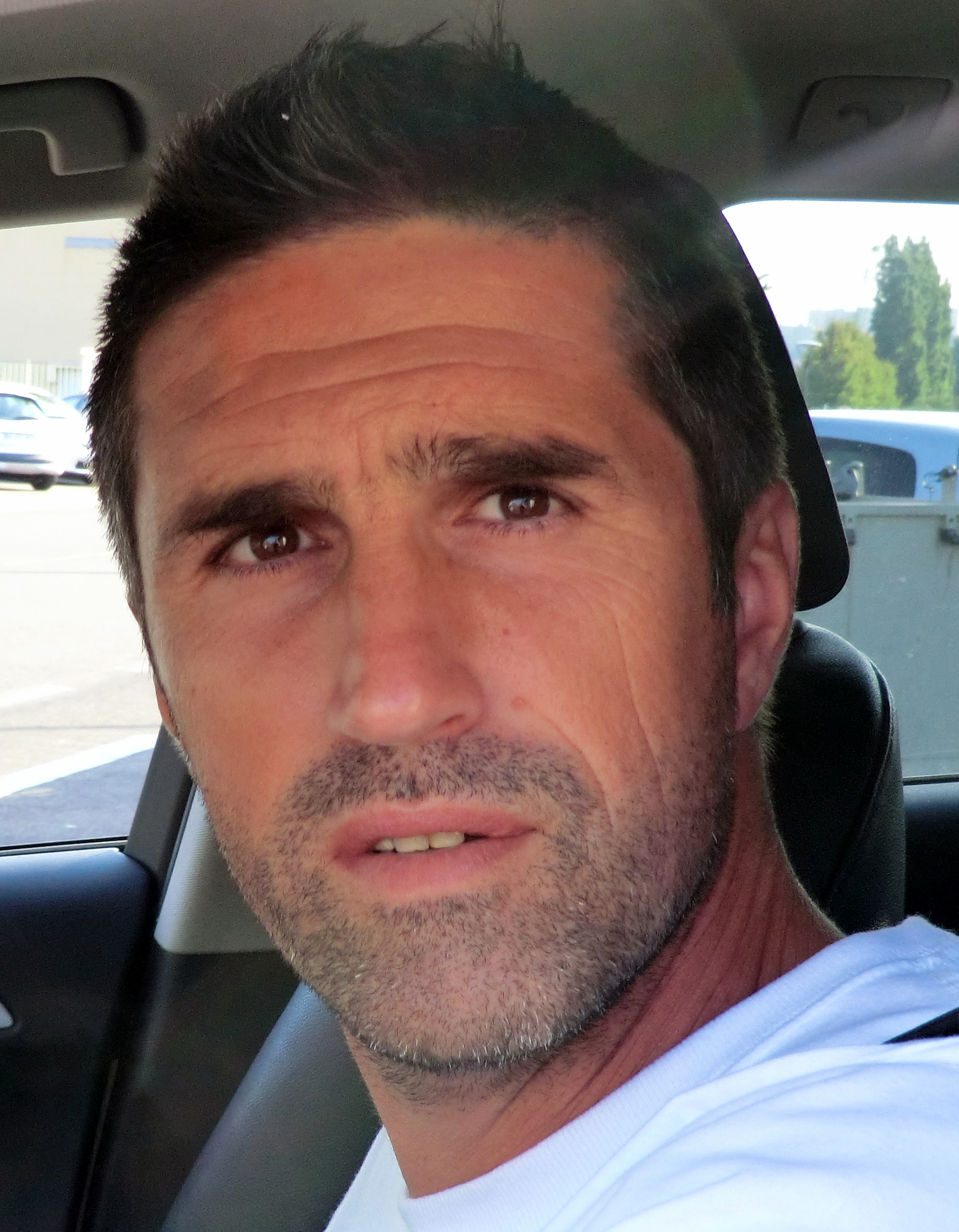
- Flachez in 2013

Personal information
- Date of birth: 5 August 1972 (age 54)
- Place of birth: Grenoble, France
- Height: 1.81 m (5 ft 11 in)
- Position: Centre-back

Youth career
- ES Manival
- Lyon

Senior career*
Years	Team	Apps	(Gls)
1992–1995	Lyon	55	(2)
1995–1996	Martigues	31	(3)
1996–2004	Sochaux	280	(12)
2004–2005	Guingamp	30	(0)
2005–2007	Valenciennes	67	(2)
2007–2009	Grenoble	47	(0)
Total		510	(19)

International career
1992–1995	France U21		

Managerial career
- 2013–2015: Lyon (U19)
- 2015–2017: Lyon B
- 2018: Montreal Impact (assistant)
- 2019–2021: Marseille B (assistant)
- 2021–2022: Chateauroux (assistant)
- 2022–2023: Chateauroux
- * Club domestic league appearances and goals

Maxence Flachez (born 5 August 1972) is a French former professional footballer who played as a central defender, and is a manager.

== Playing career ==
Born in Grenoble, Flachez made his professional – and Ligue 1 – debut for Lyon on 29 August 1992 (aged 20), in a 2–2 home draw against Marseille. Ironically, after gaining more experience he appeared less for the first team, eventually leaving in the summer of 1995.

After one year in Martigues, Flachez joined Sochaux, where he would remain for eight straight seasons always as an undisputed starter (four years apiece in the top flight and Ligue 2), playing more than 300 competitive matches. In 2002–03 he helped the team finish fifth and reach the final of the Coupe de la Ligue; as the latter competition winners Monaco ranked second in the league and qualified for the UEFA Champions League, Sochaux qualified for the UEFA Cup, where the player took part in his first matches (six).

Flachez spent one more campaign in the second division with Guingamp, then switched to another side in that level, Valenciennes, which he helped promote immediately as champions. A final promotion to the top tier was achieved in 2007–08, with hometown's Grenoble; after their subsequent relegation, he retired from football at nearly 37 and returned to first professional club Lyon, as a TV pundit for the official channel.

== Coaching career ==
Flachez started working as a manager in 2015, going on to spend four years at Lyon in charge of the under-19 side as well as the reserves.

On 10 January 2018, Flachez was appointed assistant manager of Canadian club Montreal Impact under manager Rémi Garde.

In July 2019 it was confirmed, that Flanchez would be the assistant manager of Philippe Anziani for the B-team of Marseille.

== Honours ==
Sochaux

- Ligue 2: 2000–01
- Coupe de la Ligue: 2003–04; runner-up 2002–03

Valenciennes

- Ligue 2: 2005–06
