= Nancy-Lorraine =

Nancy-Lorraine might refer to:

- EF Nancy-Lorraine, French football club active between 1943 and 1944
- AS Nancy-Lorraine, French football club founded in 1967
- Nancy-Lorraine, a minor planet
