= Albert Eloy =

Albert Eloy may refer to:

- Albert Éloy-Vincent, (1868–1945), French journalist and painter
- Albert Eloy (footballer, 1892–1947), French footballer
- Albert Eloy (footballer, 1927–2008), French footballer
