= Raymond Krug =

French footballer (1924–1990)

Personal information
- Date of birth: 19 October 1924
- Place of birth: Strasbourg, Bas-Rhin, France
- Date of death: 8 January 1990 (aged 65)
- Place of death: Strasbourg, Bas-Rhin, France
- Position: Midfielder

Senior career*
Years	Team	Apps	(Gls)
1947-1956	Strasbourg	201	(11)
1956-1957	FC Bischwiller		

International career
1948	France Olympic	2	(0)
- * Club domestic league appearances and goals

Raymond Krug (19 October 1924 – 8 January 1990) was a French footballer who played as a midfielder. He competed in the men's tournament at the 1948 Summer Olympics.

== Club career ==
Krug played for Strasbourg from 1947 to 1956, winning the 1951 Coupe de France.

Then he played for FC Bischwiller from 1956 to 1957.

== International career ==
He was selected in France Football squad for the 1948 Summer Olympics, and played France two Games against India and Great Britain, as France were eliminated in the Quarterfinals. He never had a cap with France senior team.

== Honours ==
Strasbourg

- Coupe de France: 1951
