= 1951 Coupe de France final =

- Event: 1950–51 Coupe de France
Strasbourg	Valenciennes
3	0
- Date: 6 May 1951
- Venue: Olympique Yves-du-Manoir, Colombes
- Referee: Paul Olivia
- Attendance: 61,492

The 1951 Coupe de France final was a football match held at Stade Olympique Yves-du-Manoir, Colombes on 6 May 1951, that saw RC Strasbourg defeat US Valenciennes-Anzin 3–0 thanks to goals by René Bihel, Raymond Krug and André Nagy.

== Match details ==
6 May 1951

Strasbourg	3–0	Valenciennes
Bihel 24'; Krug 34'; Nagy 87'

Stade Olympique Yves-du-Manoir, Colombes
Attendance: 61,492
Referee: Paul Olivia

GK	(France) Lucien Schaeffer
DF	(France) René Hauss
DF	(France) René Démaret
DF	(France) Raymond Krug
DF	(France) Michel Wawrzyniak	(c)
MF	(Soviet Union) Alexandre Vanags
MF	(France) Claude Battistella
FW	(Hungary) André Nagy
FW	(France) René Bihel
FW	(France) Michel Jacques
FW	(France) Edmond Haan
Manager:
(France) Charles Nicolas Assistant Referees: Fourth Official:

GK	(France) Félix Witkowski	(c)
DF	(France) Antoine Pazur
DF	(France) Marcel Gaillard
DF	(France) Grégoire Izidorczyk
DF	(France) Simon Blaszczyk
MF	(France) Emile Wassmer
MF	(France) Emile Vrand
FW	(France) Marius Rozé
FW	(Italy) (Argentina) Juan Carlos Verdeal
FW	(France) Marcel Létugeon
FW	(France) Pierre Goffart
Manager:
(France) Henri Pérus

== See also ==
- 1950–51 Coupe de France
