= Vincent Hognon =

French football player and manager (born 1974)

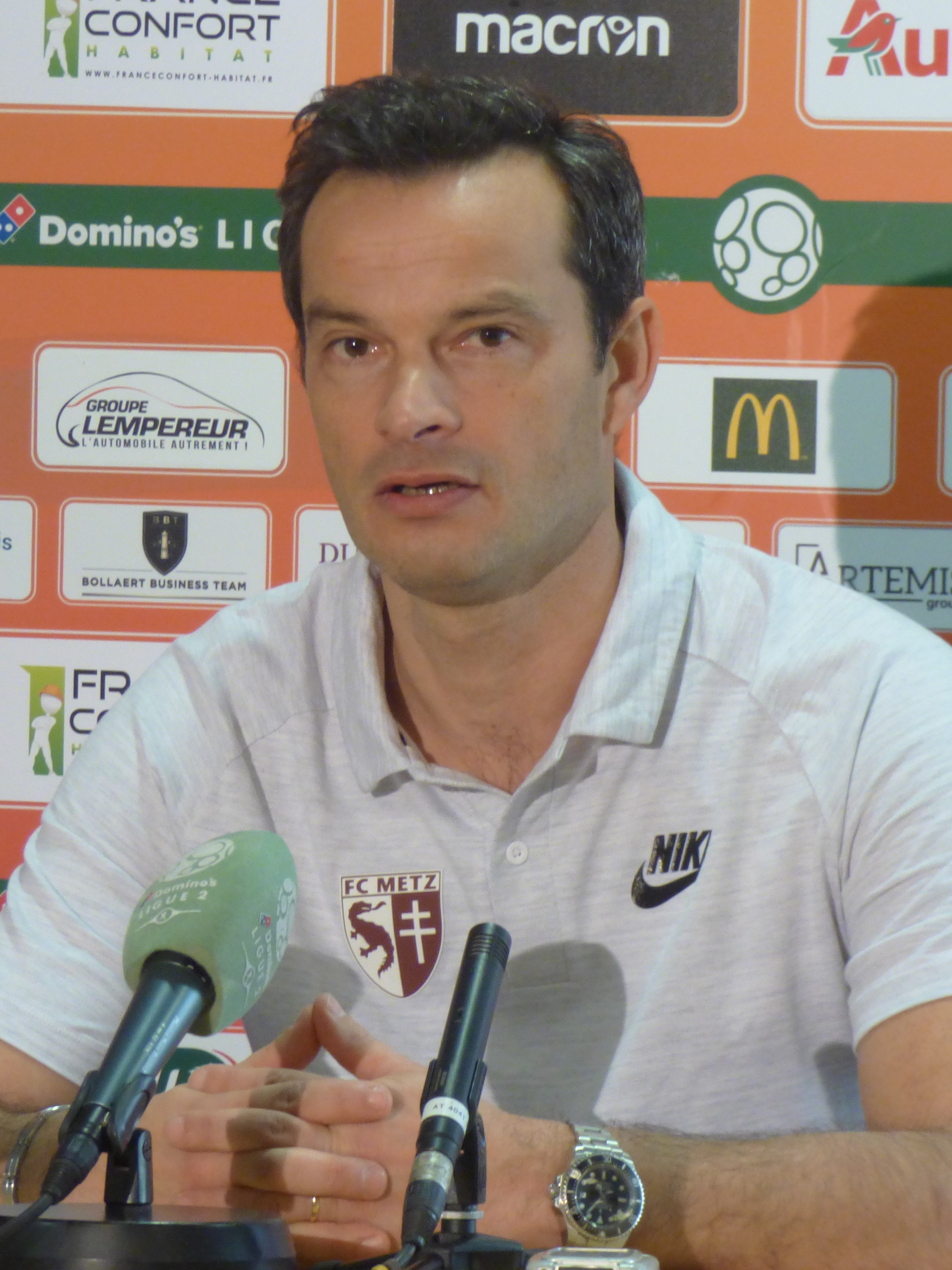
- Hognon during a press conference as Metz interim manager in 2019

Personal information
- Date of birth: 16 August 1974 (age 52)
- Place of birth: Nancy, France
- Height: 1.83 m (6 ft 0 in)
- Position: Centre-back

Team information
- Current team: Sochaux (manager)

Youth career
- 1988–1993: Nancy

Senior career*
Years	Team	Apps	(Gls)
1993–2002	Nancy	202	(9)
2002–2007	Saint-Étienne	159	(16)
2007–2009	Nice	34	(3)
Total		395	(28)

Managerial career
- 2010–2013: Nancy (under-19s)
- 2013–2017: Nancy (assistant)
- 2017–2018: Nancy
- 2018: Metz (assistant)
- 2018–2020: Metz (interim)
- 2021: Hesperange
- 2021–2024: Grenoble
- 2024–2025: Valenciennes
- 2025–: Sochaux
- * Club domestic league appearances and goals

Vincent Hognon (born 16 August 1974) is a French professional football manager and former player who played as a defender. He is the manager of Championnat National club Sochaux.

He spent his playing career in Ligue 1 and Ligue 2 at Nancy, Saint-Étienne and Nice. He managed Nancy, Metz and Grenoble in Ligue 2, winning the title with the second club in 2018–19 and then leading them in Ligue 1.

== Playing career ==
Born in Nancy, Hognon started his career at hometown club Nancy in Ligue 2, making his debut during the 1993–94 season. He played a total of nine seasons with the club, three of them in Ligue 1, before moving to Saint-Étienne, who had recently been relegated to Ligue 2 following a fake passport scandal. However, the club won promotion during his second season there, and Hognon became a key member of the side during their past three seasons in the top division. During the summer 2007, he signed for Nice, where he played until hanging up his boots in 2009.

== Managerial career ==
=== Nancy ===
Hognon became assistant manager of Nancy in January 2013, working alongside Patrick Gabriel. On 30 August 2017, he succeeded Pablo Correa as manager, as the team had not won any of the first five games of the Ligue 2 season. On his debut eight days later, the team won 3–0 at home to Valenciennes. After four wins in 17 games, he was dismissed by the 17th-placed team on 22 January.

=== Metz ===
In August 2018, Hognon was hired at Nancy's local rivals Metz as an assistant to Frédéric Antonetti. When Antonetti returned to his native Corsica on short notice due to his wife's illness, Antonetti became interim manager, beginning his term on 17 December with a 2–0 win at Valenciennes. After winning promotion to Ligue 1 as champions, he was confirmed as coach while his predecessor became general manager.

Hognon's first Ligue 1 game as manager was a 1–1 draw at Strasbourg on 11 August 2019. The season was abandoned with ten games remaining due to the COVID-19 pandemic, with Metz in 15th. On 12 October 2020, Antonetti – widowed in July – replaced Hognon, who declined the opportunity to remain as assistant.

=== Hesperange ===
On 22 June 2021, Hognon was hired on a contract of undisclosed length by Hesperange, who had finished the previous season third in the Luxembourg National Division. His first game was his first in European competition, a 1–0 loss at Slovenia's Domžale on 8 July in the UEFA Europa Conference League first qualifying round, followed a week later by elimination after a 1–1 draw in the second leg. He was fired on 19 September, having won three and drawn two of six league games.

=== Grenoble ===
Hognon returned to Ligue 2 on 29 December 2021, being hired by 16th-placed Grenoble. He missed his debut, a 1–0 loss at home to Auxerre on 8 January, due to COVID; eight days later he led the team to a goalless draw away to Guingamp. The team finished the season in 15th. His team reached the quarter-finals of the Coupe de France in 2022–23, their first such achievement in 14 years. The league season ended with the club in 10th.

On 13 March 2024, Hognon was sacked by Grenoble, with the club in 6th place. They had lost their last five matches.

=== Valenciennes ===
On 16 December 2024, Hognon was hired at Valenciennes, ranked 12th in the Championnat National. He finished his only season in 9th place and left by mutual agreement.

=== Sochaux ===
On 22 May 2025, a day after leaving Valenciennes, Hognon signed for Sochaux in the same division on a two-year contract with the option for one more. The clause would be activated automatically in case of promotion.

== Managerial statistics ==
As of match played 16 May 2025

Managerial record by team and tenure
Team	From	To	Record								
Team	From	To	P	W	D	L	GF	GA	GD	Win %	Ref.
Nancy	30 August 2017	22 January 2018	21	6	6	9	29	30	−1	28.57	
Metz	18 May 2019	12 October 2020	36	10	12	14	34	45	−11	27.78	
Grenoble	29 December 2021	13 March 2024	96	36	24	36	100	100	+0	37.50	
Valenciennes	16 December 2024	30 June 2025	20	7	7	6	31	27	+4	35.00	
Total			173	59	49	65	194	202	−8	34.10	—

== Honours ==
=== Player ===
Nancy

- Division 2: 1997–98

Saint-Étienne

- Ligue 2: 2003–04

=== Manager ===
Metz

- Ligue 2: 2018–19
