= Laslo Seleš =

Yugoslav footballer

Personal information
- Date of birth: 23 June 1943 (age 83)
- Place of birth: Petrovgrad, German-occupied Serbia
- Position: Defender

Senior career*
| Years | Team | Apps | (Gls) |
| 1962–1969 | Proleter Zrenjanin | 202 | (3) |
| 1969–1979 | Sochaux | 296 | (11) |
| Total | | 498 | (14) |
- * Club domestic league appearances and goals

Laslo Seleš (born 23 June 1943) is a Yugoslav former professional footballer who played as a defender.

== Career ==
Over the course of his 17-year-long career, Seleš played for Proleter Zrenjanin in Yugoslavia (1962–1969) and Sochaux in France (1969–1979). He helped his parent club win promotion to the Yugoslav First League for the first time ever in 1967. After suffering relegation from the top flight in 1969, Seleš moved abroad and signed with Sochaux, amassing nearly 300 appearances in the top flight of French football over the next decade.

== Career statistics ==
| Club | Season | League | | |
| Club | Season | Division | Apps | Goals |
|---|---|---|---|---|
| Proleter Zrenjanin | 1962–63 | Yugoslav Second League | 26 | 0 |
| Proleter Zrenjanin | 1963–64 | Yugoslav Second League | 30 | 1 |
| Proleter Zrenjanin | 1964–65 | Yugoslav Second League | 27 | 0 |
| Proleter Zrenjanin | 1965–66 | Yugoslav Second League | 33 | 2 |
| Proleter Zrenjanin | 1966–67 | Yugoslav Second League | 24 | 0 |
| Proleter Zrenjanin | 1967–68 | Yugoslav First League | 29 | 0 |
| Proleter Zrenjanin | 1968–69 | Yugoslav First League | 33 | 0 |
| Proleter Zrenjanin | Total | | 202 | 3 |
| Sochaux | 1969–70 | French Division 1 | 26 | 0 |
| Sochaux | 1970–71 | French Division 1 | 26 | 0 |
| Sochaux | 1971–72 | French Division 1 | 35 | 0 |
| Sochaux | 1972–73 | French Division 1 | 34 | 5 |
| Sochaux | 1973–74 | French Division 1 | 33 | 3 |
| Sochaux | 1974–75 | French Division 1 | 20 | 0 |
| Sochaux | 1975–76 | French Division 1 | 36 | 1 |
| Sochaux | 1976–77 | French Division 1 | 34 | 1 |
| Sochaux | 1977–78 | French Division 1 | 32 | 1 |
| Sochaux | 1978–79 | French Division 1 | 20 | 0 |
| Sochaux | Total | | 296 | 11 |
| Career total | | | 498 | 14 |
