= Lucien Schaeffer =

French footballer (1928–2016)

Personal information
- Date of birth: 6 June 1928
- Place of birth: Eschau, Bas-Rhin, France
- Date of death: 28 December 2016 (aged 88)
- Place of death: Eschau, Bas-Rhin, France
- Position: Goalkeeper

Youth career
- FC Eschau
- ?–1946: FAIG

Senior career*
Years	Team	Apps	(Gls)
1947–1953	Strasbourg	115	
1953–1963	Valenciennes	302	
1963–1965	US Chauny		

International career
1948	France Olympic		

Managerial career
- 1963–1965: US Chauny
- * Club domestic league appearances and goals

Lucien Schaeffer (6 June 1928 – 28 December 2016) was a French football goalkeeper who was a member of the French squad at the 1948 Summer Olympics, but he did not play in any matches.

== Club career ==
Schaeffer started football at FC Eschau and FAIG. In 1945, he was recruited by Strasbourg, starting as an amateur player until 1948 With Strasbourg he won the 1951 Coupe de France, the club's first ever honour while he was the starting goalkeeper. In 1953 he went to Valenciennes where he stayed 10 years. He then ended his career at amateur side US Chauny, from 1963 to 1965.

== International career ==
Schaeffer was selected in France Football squad for the 1948 Summer Olympics, and was an unused substitute for the two Games against India and Great Britain, as France were eliminated in the quarterfinals.

== Managerial career ==
Schaeffer had a brief stint as a manager from 1963 to 1965 at US Chauny while he was still a player there.

== Death ==
Schaeffer died on 28 December 2016 at the age of 88.

== Honours ==
Strasbourg

- Coupe de France: 1951
