= Marcel Gaillard (French footballer) =

French footballer (1923-2007)

Personal information
- Date of birth: 17 November 1923
- Place of birth: Nanterre, France
- Date of death: 2 January 2007 (aged 83)
- Place of death: Valenciennes, France
- Height: 1.72 m (5 ft 7 1/2 in)
- Position: Full back

Youth career
- US Nanterre

Senior career*
Years	Team	Apps	(Gls)
1946–1948	RC Strasbourg		
1948–1950	OGC Nice		
1950–1957	US Valenciennes-Anzin		
- * Club domestic league appearances and goals

Marcel Gaillard (17 November 1923 – 2 January 2007) was a French footballer who played for RC Strasbourg, OGC Nice and US Valenciennes-Anzin. Gaillard won the 1951 French Championship with Nice, and participated in the Coupe de France Final 1951 with Valenciennes.
