= Jean-Luc Ruty =

French footballer and manager (born 1959)

Personal information
- Date of birth: 5 July 1959 (age 67)
- Place of birth: Arbois, France
- Position: Defender

Team information
- Current team: Sochaux (Caretaker)

Youth career
- Sochaux

Senior career*
Years	Team	Apps	(Gls)
1978–1986	Sochaux	246	
1986–1992	Toulouse		

International career
- France U-21

Managerial career
- 1992–1999: Toulouse (Youth academy)
- 1993–1994: Toulouse (caretaker)
- 1999–: Sochaux (youth academy)
- 2007: Sochaux (caretaker)
- * Club domestic league appearances and goals

Jean-Luc Ruty (born 5 July 1959) is a football former defender and manager.
