= Milhars =

- Commune
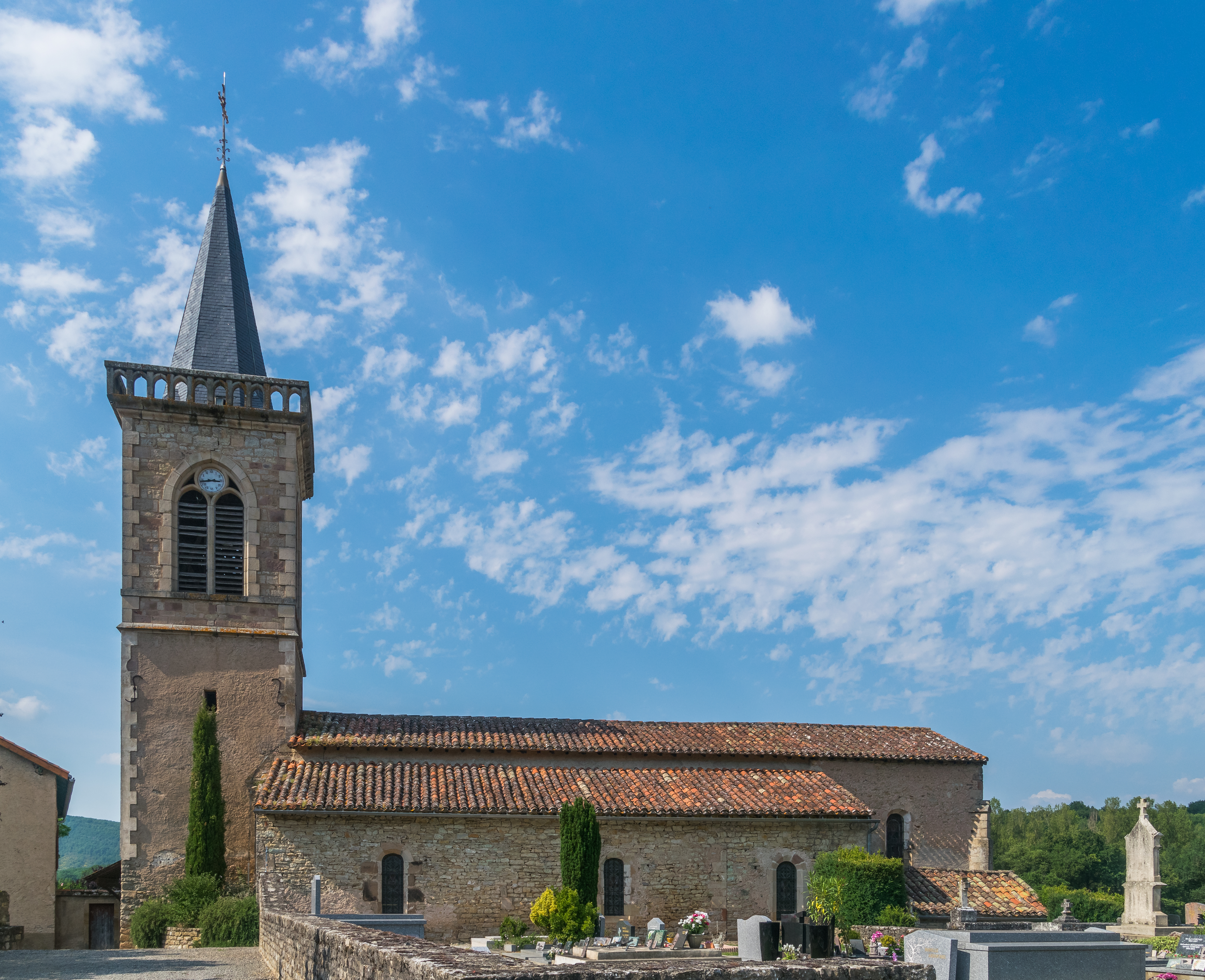

- Coat of arms
- Location of Milhars
- Location within France Location within Occitanie
- Coordinates: 44°07′41″N 1°52′48″E
- Country: France
- Region: Occitania
- Department: Tarn
- Arrondissement: Albi
- Canton: Carmaux-2 Vallée du Cérou

Government
  - Mayor (2020–2026): Pierre Paillas
- Area^{1}: 16.28 km^{2} (6.29 sq mi)
- Elevation: 140 m (460 ft)
- Highest elevation: 461 m (1,512 ft)
- Lowest elevation: 130 m (430 ft)
- Population (2023): 226
  - Density: 13.9/km^{2} (36.0/sq mi)
- Time zone: UTC+01:00 (CET)
  - Summer (DST): UTC+02:00 (CEST)
- INSEE/Postal code: 81165 /81170
- ^{1} French Land Register data, which excludes lakes, ponds, glaciers > 1 km^{2} (0.386 sq mi or 247 acres) and river estuaries.

Milhars (French pronunciation: [mijaʁ]) is a commune in the Tarn department in southern France.

== Geography ==
The river Cérou flows into the Aveyron in the commune, 1.4 km north to the village itself.

== See also ==
- Communes of the Tarn department
