= Paul Wartel =

French footballer (1903-1976)

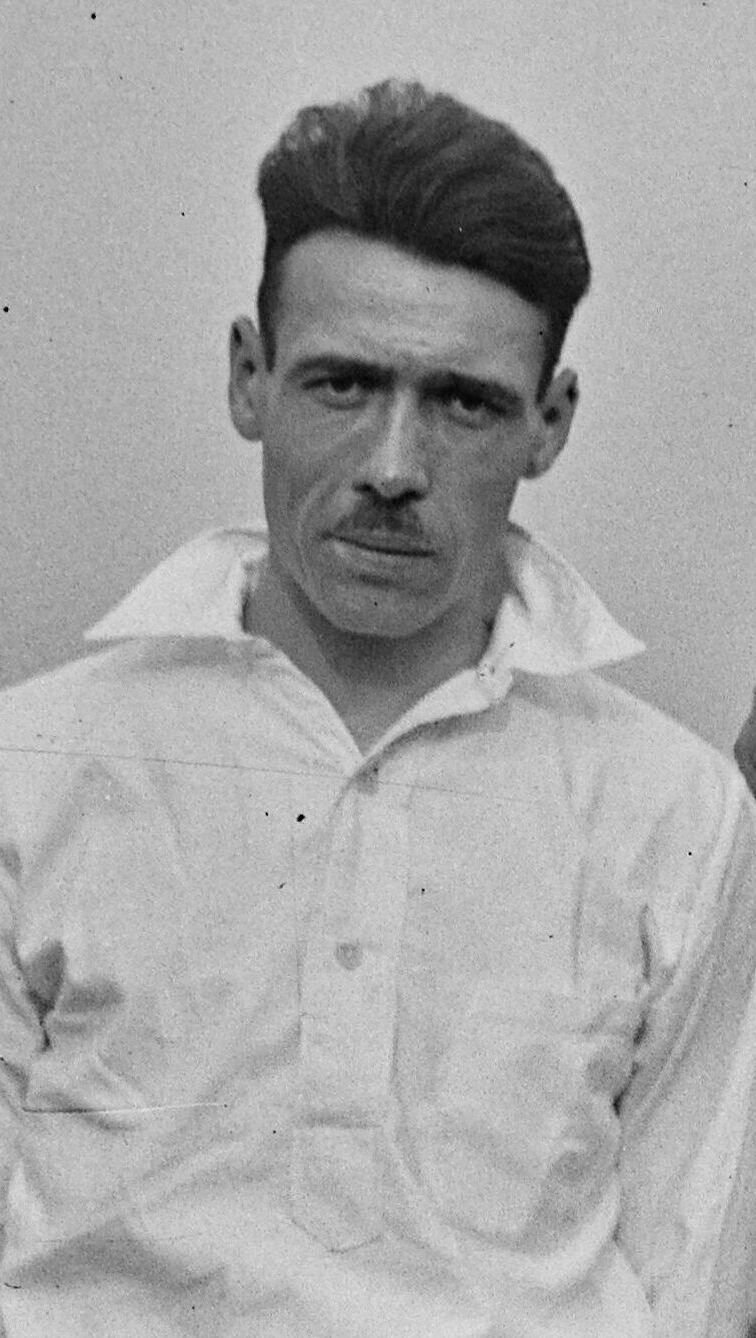

Personal information
- Date of birth: 26 April 1903
- Place of birth: Puteaux, France
- Date of death: 27 April 1976 (aged 73)
- Position: Defender

Senior career*
Years	Team	Apps	(Gls)
1926–1929	Red Star		
1929–1933	Sochaux		

Managerial career
- 1933–1934: US Servannaise et Malouine
- 1939–1944: Sochaux
- 1943–1944: EF Nancy-Lorraine
- 1944–1946: Marseille
- 1946–1952: Sochaux
- 1953–1956: Besançon RC
- 1957–1960: Sochaux (assistant-coach)
- 1960: Sochaux
- * Club domestic league appearances and goals

Paul Wartel (26 April 1903 – 27 April 1976) was a French football defender who, between 1926 and 1933, played for Red Star and FC Sochaux-Montbéliard and, between 1933 and 1960, managed and coached five teams.

At the end of his playing career, Paul Wartel, a native of the Paris suburb of Puteaux, spent most of the following twenty-seven years as a team manager and/or coach with Sochaux-Montbéliard and four other teams, US Servannaise et Malouine, EF Nancy-Lorraine, Olympique de Marseille and Besançon RC.
