= Castrop =

Place in North Rhine-Westphalia, Germany

Coordinates: 51°32′55″N 7°18′37″E

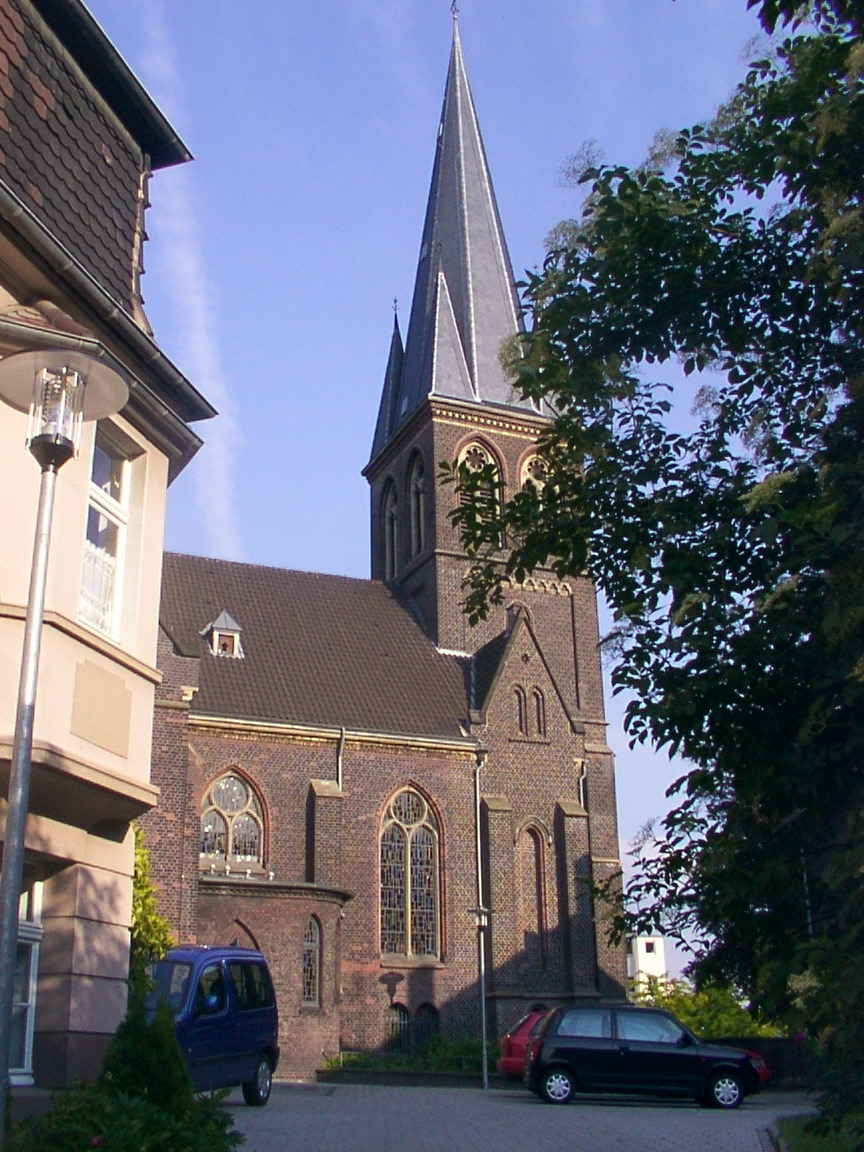
Lutheran church

Castrop, since 1 April 1926, is part of Castrop-Rauxel, North Rhine-Westphalia, Germany.

The name comes from trop/torp for village (German Dorf) and chasto/kast for shed. The oldest mention is from 834 as Villa Castrop.

During the Saxon Wars, Charlemagne used the old Roman streets. For supply Reichshöfe (singular Reichshof) were built. Near to these Reichshöfe, settlements often grew.

The Reichshof Castrop was given to the von Bordelius in 1611.
