= Albert Eloy (footballer, born 1927) =

French footballer (1927–2008)

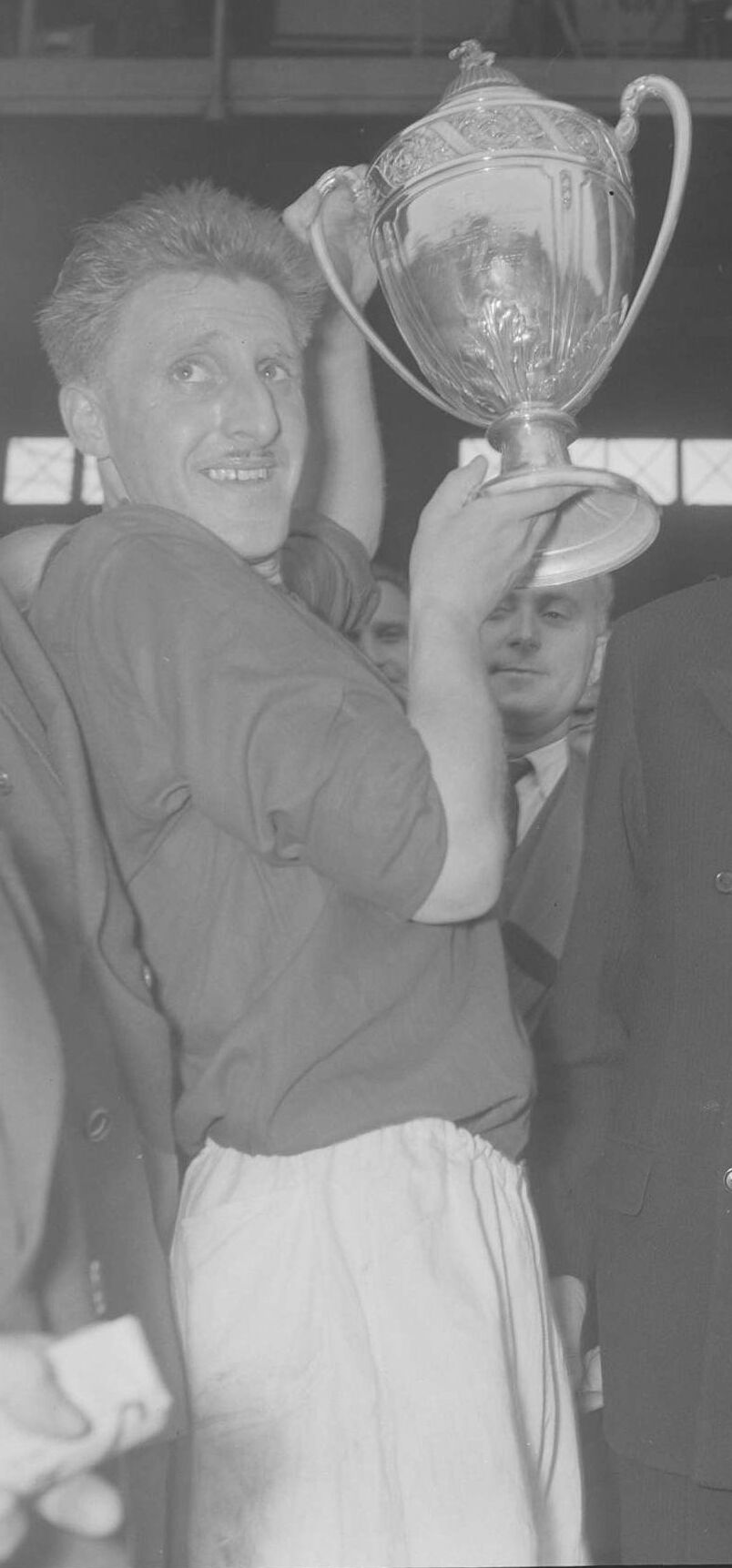
- Eloy in 1956

Personal information
- Date of birth: 30 June 1927
- Place of birth: Bully-les-Mines, France
- Date of death: 8 December 2008 (aged 81)
- Place of death: Troyes, France
- Position: Defender

Senior career*
| Years | Team | Apps | (Gls) |
| 1949–1958 | Sedan-Torcy | | |
| 1958–1961 | Le Havre | | |

Managerial career
- 1961–1962: Caen
- * Club domestic league appearances and goals

Albert Eloy (30 June 1927 – 8 December 2008) was a French football player and manager. He played as defender for Sedan-Torcy. With the Ardennes club, he was the winner of the Coupe de France in 1956. He repeated the achievement three years later, with Le Havre, the club where he finished his career. He was manager of Caen from 1961 to 1962. He also competed in the men's tournament at the 1952 Summer Olympics.

== Honours ==
Sedan-Torcy

- Coupe de France: 1956

Le Havre

- French Division 2: 1958–59
- Coupe de France: 1959
