= Joseph Tellechéa =

French footballer (1926–2015)

Personal information
- Full name: Joseph Tellechéa
- Date of birth: 27 November 1926
- Place of birth: Drancy, Seine-Saint-Denis, France
- Date of death: 16 November 2015 (aged 88)
- Place of death: Montferrand-le-Château, Doubs, France
- Height: 1.75 m (5 ft 9 in)
- Position: Midfielder

Senior career*
Years	Team	Apps	(Gls)
1946–1961	Sochaux		

International career
1955–1959	France	3	(1)
- * Club domestic league appearances and goals

Joseph Tellechéa (27 November 1926 – 16 November 2015) was a French footballer who played as a midfielder for FC Sochaux-Montbéliard and RC Franc-Comtois.
