= Abdel Djaadaoui =

Algerian footballer and manager (born 1947)

Personal information
- Full name: Abdelghani Djaadaoui
- Date of birth: 27 June 1947 (age 79)
- Place of birth: Béni Saf, Algeria
- Height: 1.81 m (5 ft 11 in)
- Position: Defender

Senior career*
Years	Team	Apps	(Gls)
1965–1969	USA Clichy		
1969–1970	CA Romainville		
1970–1972	Rouen	46	(4)
1972–1982	Sochaux	307	(13)
1982–1984	Le Havre	45	(0)

International career
1973–1984	Algeria	3	(0)

Managerial career
- 1996–1997: Red Star
- 2000: Algeria
- * Club domestic league appearances and goals

Abdelghani Djaadaoui (born 27 June 1947) is a former professional footballer who played as a defender. He spent his career in France and played for Algeria. He also coached Algeria.

== Career statistics ==
=== Club ===
Appearances and goals by club, season and competition
Club	Season	League			Cup (Note: Includes the Coupe de France.)		Continental		Total	
Club	Season	Division	Apps	Goals	Apps	Goals	Apps	Goals	Apps	Goals
Rouen	1970–71	Division 2	16	1	2	0	—		18	1
Rouen	1971–72	Division 2	30	3	4	0	—		34	3
Rouen	Total		46	4	6	0	—		52	4
Sochaux	1972–73	Division 1	27	3	0	0	—		27	3
Sochaux	1973–74	Division 1	37	2	8	1	—		45	3
Sochaux	1974–75	Division 1	34	2	5	0	—		39	2
Sochaux	1975–76	Division 1	33	0	5	1	—		38	1
Sochaux	1976–77	Division 1	38	1	7	0	2 (Note: Appearance(s) in UEFA Cup)	0	47	1
Sochaux	1977–78	Division 1	33	3	8	0	—		41	3
Sochaux	1978–79	Division 1	34	2	1	0	—		35	2
Sochaux	1979–80	Division 1	37	0	7	0	—		44	0
Sochaux	1980–81	Division 1	27	0	2	0	9	0	38	0
Sochaux	1981–82	Division 1	7	0	1	0	—		8	0
Sochaux	Total		307	13	44	2	11	0	362	15
Le Havre	1982–83	Division 2	33	0	3	0	—		36	0
Le Havre	1983–84	Division 2	12	0	0	0	—		12	0
Le Havre	Total		45	0	3	0	—		48	0
Career total			398	17	54	2	11	0	463	19
