= Georges Sesia =

French association football player (1924–2016)

Personal information
- Date of birth: 8 July 1924
- Place of birth: Villerupt, France
- Date of death: 12 May 2016 (aged 91)
- Height: 1.75 m (5 ft 9 in)
- Position: Striker

Senior career*
Years	Team	Apps	(Gls)
1943–1944	Nancy-Lorraine		
1944–1948	FC Nancy	92	(36)
1948–1951	Stade Français Paris	100	(30)
1951–1952	Roubaix-Tourcoing	29	(13)
1952–1955	Strasbourg	91	(38)
1955–1957	Béziers	62	(23)
1961–1962	Merlebach		
Total		374	(140)

International career
1948	France	1	(0)
- * Club domestic league appearances and goals

Georges Sesia (8 July 1924 – 12 May 2016) was a French footballer who played as a striker.

== Career ==
Born in Villerupt, Sesia played for Nancy-Lorraine, FC Nancy, Stade Français Paris, Roubaix-Tourcoing, Strasbourg, Béziers, and Merlebach.

He also made one appearance for the France national team in 1948. At the time of his death on 12 May 2016, aged 91, he was the oldest living former French international player.
