= René Gardien =

French footballer (1928-2006)

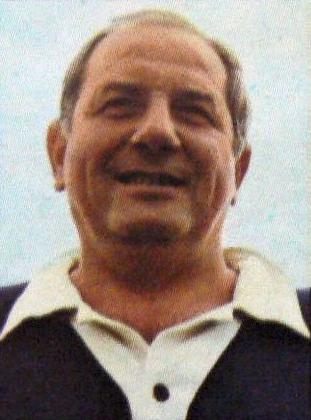
- Gardien in 1980

Personal information
- Date of birth: 10 February 1928
- Place of birth: Chambéry, Savoie, France
- Date of death: 1 February 2006 (aged 77)
- Height: 1.77 m (5 ft 10 in)
- Position: Forward

Senior career*
Years	Team	Apps	(Gls)
1947–1959	Sochaux		
1959–1960	Lille		
1960–1961	Besançon		

International career
1953	France	2	(2)

Managerial career
- 1962–1969: Thiers
- 1969–1970: Grenoble
- 1970–1973: Lille
- 1974–1983: Montluçon
- 1988–1990: Clermont
- * Club domestic league appearances and goals

René Auguste Gardien (10 February 1928 – 1 February 2006) was a French footballer who played as a forward, most notably at FC Sochaux, and scored 122 league goals and 2 international goals. He later became a manager.

== Playing career ==
Gardien played for Sochaux from July 1947 to June 1959, and then one season each at Lille and Besançon. He played for the France national team in two friendlies in 1953, scoring 2 goals in the first, against Wales.

== Managerial career ==
From 1962 to 1969, Gardien was a manager at Thiers. After one season managing at Grenoble, he managed Lille from 1970 to 1973, Montluçon from 1974 to 1983, and Clermont from 1988 to 1990.

== Honours ==
Sochaux

- Coupe de France: finalist 1959
