= Philippe Anziani =

French football striker and manager (born 1961)

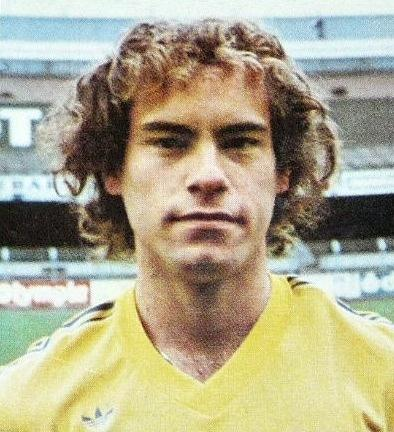
- Anziani in 1980

Personal information
- Date of birth: 21 September 1961 (age 65)
- Place of birth: Bône, French Algeria
- Height: 1.76 m (5 ft 9 in)
- Position: Striker

Youth career
- 1977–1978: Meaux

Senior career*
Years	Team	Apps	(Gls)
1978–1984	Sochaux	153	(40)
1984–1986	Monaco	64	(17)
1986–1988	Nantes	71	(20)
1988–1989	Matra Racing	33	(9)
1989–1993	Toulon	165	(10)
1993–1994	Martigues	32	(2)
1994–1996	GFCO Ajaccio	48	(5)
Total		566	(103)

International career
1981–1987	France	5	(1)

Managerial career
- 1997–1998: Sochaux (Assistant coach)
- 1998–1999: Sochaux
- 2009: Bastia
- 2010–2011: Nantes (Assistant coach)
- 2011: Nantes
- 2019–: Marseille B
- * Club domestic league appearances and goals

Philippe Anziani (born 21 September 1961) is a French former football striker and manager. In 2019, he became manager of the Olympique de Marseille reserves in the fourth tier.

== Coaching career ==
Anziani became SC Bastia manager ahead of the 2009–10 season. On 26 November 2009, he was fired due to poor results.

He was named FC Nantes manager in March 2011.
