= ÉF Reims-Champagne =

French football club

- Full name: Équipe Fédérale Reims-Champagne
- Founded: 1943 (Year of foundation)
- Dissolved: 1944
- Ground: Reims

Équipe Fédérale Reims-Champagne was a French football club located in Reims, France.

== History ==
During World War II in 1943, new so-called Federal (EF) teams were created at the request of the Vichy France government. These brought together professional players from D1 clubs. ÉF Reims-Champagne made it to the 1944 Coupe de France Final, where they lost 4–0 to EF Nancy-Lorraine. The Federal teams were dismantled after that season, and professional clubs reinstated.

== Colours and badge ==
Reims-Champagne's kits were blue with a white stripe on the chest.

== Honours ==
- Coupe de France
  - Runners-up: 1944
