= Norbert Hofmann (footballer, born 1951) =

German footballer

Personal information
- Full name: Norbert Hofmann
- Date of birth: 14 August 1951 (age 75)
- Place of birth: Germany
- Height: 1.78 m (5 ft 10 in)
- Position: Utility player

Senior career*
Years	Team	Apps	(Gls)
- VfB Altenhausen
- VfB Coburg
–1974	FC Bayreuth		
1974–1979	SpVgg Bayreuth	170	(12)
1979–1984	FC Bayer 05 Uerdingen	142	(33)
1984–1990	TSV Ebermannstadt		

Managerial career
- 1984–1990: TSV Ebermannstadt
- 1991–1993: SC 08 Bamberg
- 1993–1995: SpVgg Bayreuth
- 1996–1999: SpVgg Jahn Forchheim
- 1999–2001: 1. SC Feucht
- 2003–2008: 1. FC Sand
- * Club domestic league appearances and goals

Norbert Hofmann (born 14 August 1951) is a German football manager and former player.

Hofmann made 74 appearances in the Bundesliga and a further 238 in the 2. Bundesliga during his playing career.
