= 1958–59 French Division 2 =

20th season of the second-tier football league in France

Division 2
- Season: 1958–59

Statistics of Division 2 in the 1958/1959 season.

== Overview ==
It was contested by 20 teams, and Le Havre won the championship.

== League standings ==
Pos	Team	Pld	W	D	L	GF	GA	GD	Pts	Promotion or relegation
1	Le Havre	38	24	7	7	93	40	+53	55	Promoted
2	Stade Français	38	21	10	7	86	46	+40	52	Promoted
3	Toulon	38	17	10	11	82	63	+19	44	Promoted
4	Girondins Bordeaux	38	17	10	11	69	56	+13	44	Promoted
5	Grenoble	38	18	6	14	65	51	+14	42	
6	FC Metz	38	13	15	10	49	50	−1	41	
7	Besançon	38	14	12	12	69	54	+15	40	
8	Sète	38	17	6	15	44	57	−13	40	
9	Montpellier	38	16	7	15	64	55	+9	39	
10	Béziers	38	13	12	13	58	54	+4	38	
11	Forbach	38	16	6	16	60	64	−4	38	
12	Rouen	38	14	9	15	74	59	+15	37	
13	AS Troyes	38	13	11	14	49	51	−2	37	
14	Nantes	38	13	9	16	49	59	−10	35	
15	Perpignan	38	11	13	14	42	58	−16	35	
16	Roubaix-Tourcoing	38	11	12	15	57	63	−6	34	
17	Cannes	38	10	12	16	50	64	−14	32	
18	Aix-en-Provence	38	11	6	21	49	74	−25	28	
19	Red Star Paris	38	9	8	21	34	72	−38	26	
20	CA Paris	38	7	9	22	34	87	−53	23	

Source: rsssf.com
