= FC Sochaux-Montbéliard =

French football club

Sochaux
- Full name: Football Club; Sochaux-Montbéliard
- Nicknames: Les Lionceaux (The Lions Cubs); Les Jaunes et Bleus (The Yellow and Blues)
- Short name: FCSM
- Founded: 14 June 1928; 98 years ago
- Stadium: Stade Auguste Bonal
- Capacity: 20,005
- Owner: FCSM 2028
- President: Clément Calvez
- Head coach: Vincent Hognon
- League: Ligue 2
- 2025–26: Championnat National, 2nd of 17 (promoted)
- Website: fcsochaux.fr
Home colours	Away colours

Football Club Sochaux-Montbéliard (French pronunciation: [sɔʃo mɔ̃beljaʁ]; commonly referred to as FCSM or simply Sochaux) is a French association football club based in the commune of Montbéliard. The club was founded in 1928 and will compete in Ligue 2, the second tier of French football, for the upcoming 2026–27 season after having been promoted from the Championnat National at the end of the 2025–26 season. Sochaux plays its home matches at the Stade Auguste Bonal, located within Montbéliard.

Sochaux was founded by Jean-Pierre Peugeot, a prominent member of the Peugeot family, and is one of the founding members of the first division of French football. The club has won both Ligue 1 and the Coupe de France twice and have also won the Coupe de la Ligue. Sochaux's last honour came in 2007 when the club, under the guidance of Alain Perrin, defeated favourites Marseille 5–4 on penalties in the 2007 Coupe de France Final. Sochaux's colours are gold and navy blue.

Sochaux is known for its youth academy, which has regularly finished in the top ten rankings of youth academies in France (fourth in 2010). The most successful team in the academy is the under-19 team, which has won the Coupe Gambardella twice, in 1973 and 2007. In 2010, Sochaux finished runners-up to Metz in the 2010 edition of the competition. The academy has produced several notable talents, such as Yannick Stopyra, El-Hadji Diouf, Jérémy Ménez, Bernard Genghini and Benoît Pedretti, among others. The club were a regular in the top flight, until relegation in 2014.

== History ==
=== Formation and early success (1928–1938) ===
Football Club Sochaux-Montbéliard was founded on 14 June 1928 under the name Football Club Sochaux by Jean-Pierre Peugeot, a director of Peugeot, a French car manufacturing company. Peugeot sought to create a football club for the leisure time of the company's workers. He installed Louis Maillard-Salin as the club's first president, and made Maurice Bailly the club's first manager. Bailly was also a member of the team. Sochaux played its first match on 2 September 1928 against the reserve team of local club AS Montbéliard. The club was inserted into the lowest level of league football in the Franche-Comté region and played its first league match three weeks later winning 12–1.

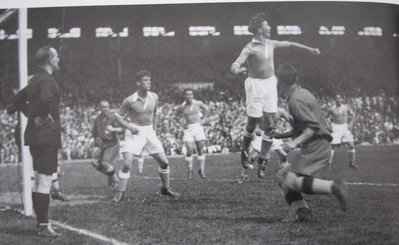
Strasbourg and Sochaux in the Coupe de France final in 1937.

Peugeot was among the first to advocate for the professionalisation of French football and, in 1929, went as far as to admit to paying his players, which was strictly forbidden during this time. The subsequent recruitment of several French internationals and players from abroad led to Sochaux gaining a stranglehold on the region easily disposing of local rivals AS Montbéliard and AS Valentigney. In June 1930, Montbéliard decided to merge with Sochaux to form the club that exists today. The following month, the National Council of the French Football Federation voted 128–20 in support of professionalism in French football. With Peugeot being a strong advocate for professionalism, Sochaux were among the first clubs to adopt the new statute and, subsequently, became professional. In the league's inaugural season, Sochaux finished 3rd in its group. The club's final position was later moved to 2nd after Antibes, the champions of the group, was disqualified from the league for suspected bribery.

In the 1934–35 season, Sochaux captured its first league title finishing one point ahead of Strasbourg. Led by Uruguayan manager Conrad Ross, as well as captain Étienne Mattler, known as Le Lion de Belfort, and strikers Roger Courtois and Bernard Williams, Sochaux dominated the league losing only four times. Two seasons later, the same team, with the addition of goalkeeper Laurent Di Lorto and the Swiss duo of André Abegglen and Maxime Lehmann, Sochaux won its first Coupe de France title. The club faced league rivals Strasbourg in the final and defeated the Alsatians 2–1 courtesy of goals from Williams and the Argentine Miguel Angel Lauri. Ross finished his career at Sochaux by winning another league title in 1938.

=== World War II and relegation (1939–1946) ===
After the 1938–39 season, Ross and several players departed the club to play and manage abroad due to the onset of World War II. The non-deserters were, subsequently, called into action to fight with the French Army, which ultimately caused the club to limit its aspiring ambitions.

During war-time, in an effort to survive financially, Sochaux formed an interim merger with local rivals AS Valentigney. The club, known as FC Sochaux-Valentigney, participated in the war-time championships from 1942 to 1944. Following the conclusion of the war, Sochaux dissolved the merger, turn professional again, and returned to its original name. The club, however, failed to get back to its form prior to the war and, subsequently, made the decision to forgo entering bidding wars for players, which was becoming the norm and, instead, focus on keeping the team's budget even. As a result, in the first season after the war, Sochaux suffered relegation after finishing in last place with only 15 points. Sochaux spent only one season in the second division and returned to Division 1 for the 1947–48 season.

=== Return to Division 1 and further cup wins (1947–1959) ===
The club spent the next 13 seasons playing in Division 1 with its best finish coming during the 1952–53 season when the club finished runner-up to champions Stade Reims. In the same season, Sochaux won its first honour since 1938 after winning the Coupe Charles Drago. In 1959, the club returned to the Coupe de France final, however, the outcome was not in Sochaux's favour, with the club losing 3–0 to Le Havre in a replay after a 2–2 draw.

=== Continued success and European football (1960–2001) ===
In the early 1960s, despite playing in Division 2, Sochaux won the Coupe Drago in back-to-back seasons. The club made its return to Division 1 in 1964, and remained in the league for over 20 years, regularly finishing in the top ten before falling down to Division 2 in the 1987–88 season. During Sochaux's 24-year run in the first division, the club played in European competitions four times. In the 1980–81 season, Sochaux surprised many by reaching the semi-finals of the UEFA Cup. In the round, the club was defeated by Dutch club AZ Alkmaar 4–3 on aggregate. The club's successful play during this stint was predominantly due to the creation of the club's academy in 1974, which paid immediate dividends. Player such as Bernard Genghini, Yannick Stopyra, Joël Bats and Philippe Anziani were among the inaugural graduates who were instrumental in Sochaux's domestic success.

=== New millennium (2001–2014) ===
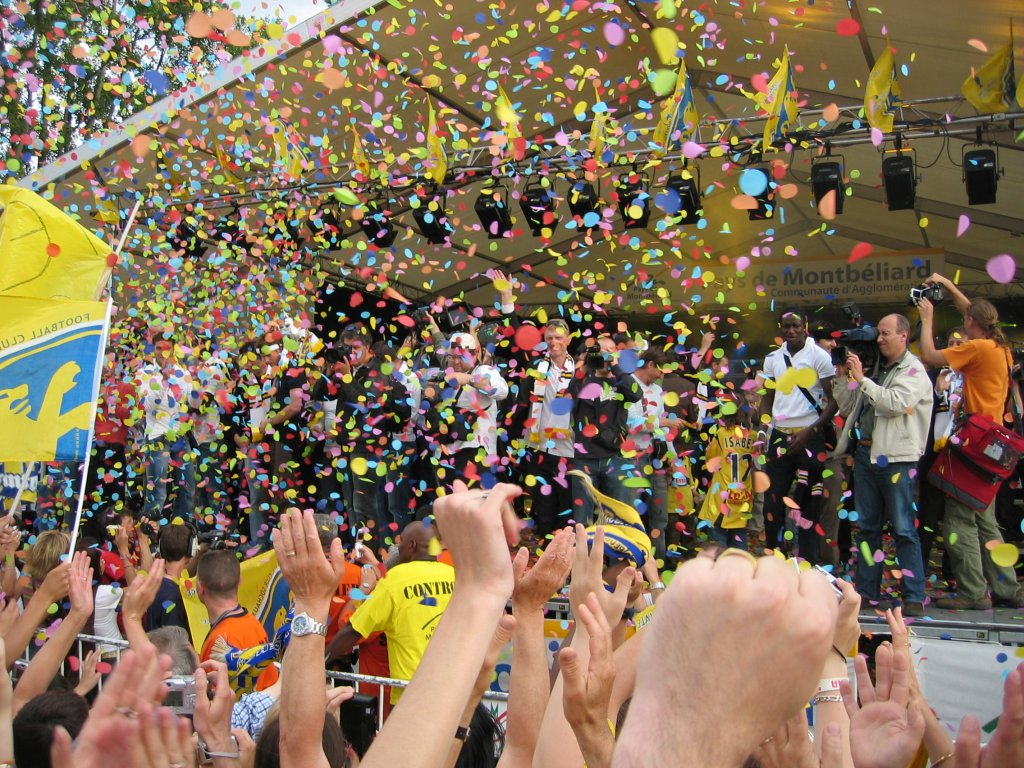
Sochaux supporters celebrating winning the Coupe de France in 2007.

After hovering between the first division and the second division in the 1990s, Sochaux returned to the first division, now called Ligue 1, at the start of the new millennium. The club surprised many by finishing within the top ten in its first three seasons back.

The club made it to the 2003 Coupe de la Ligue final, led by manager Guy Lacombe, but were defeated 4–1 by Monaco. In the following year, Sochaux won the Coupe de la Ligue 5–4 on penalties against Nantes the 2004 final, winning its first major title since winning the Coupe Drago 40 years prior.

Sochaux went on to win the Coupe de France in the 2006–07 season after defeating Marseille 5–4 on penalties. Marseille were favourites heading into match, mainly due to having beaten Sochaux 4–2 just 12 days prior to the final. However, Sochaux, led by Alain Perrin, stunned the nation and claimed its first Coupe de France title since 1937.

=== Peugeot sells Sochaux (2015–2022) ===
In July 2015, Peugeot sold the club to Hong Kong-based company Ledus for €7 million.

In April 2018 it was announced that Spanish club Deportivo Alavés, whose owners had a stake in Ledus, was starting a partnership with Sochaux. However, the agreement lasted only a few months, ending abruptly in December of the same year.

Under manager Omar Daf, Sochaux won their last game of the 2018–19 Ligue 2 season against Grenoble which saw the club finish 16th, safe from relegation. The following month on 12 June 2019, Sochaux were administratively relegated to the third tier Championnat National by the DNCG for not having presented balanced accounts. On 8 July 2019, it was announced that the club's appeal to the DNCG had been successful, and that the club would remain in Ligue 2.

In April 2020, it was announced that Chinese conglomerate, Nenking Group, who had been running the club since the end of the 2018–19 Ligue 2 season in place of Ledus, had formally acquired Sochaux. Samuel Laurent remained as Executive Director General of the club, having been appointed in July 2019.

=== Administrative relegation and return of Peugeot (2023–present) ===
On 28 June 2023, after nine consecutive seasons in Ligue 2, the DNCG confirmed the administrative relegation of Sochaux to the Championnat National, the third tier of French football, due to their financial crisis.

In August 2023, Nenking Group and Sochaux President Frankie Yau signed an agreement to sell the club back to its former president Jean-Claude Plessis and associate, Pierre Wantiez.

On 11 March 2026, Peugeot announced a five-season partnership with Sochaux nearly eleven years after selling the club. At the end of the same season, on 16 May 2026, Sochaux were promoted back to Ligue 2, having finished in second place in the 2025–26 season after three seasons in the third tier.

== Stadium ==
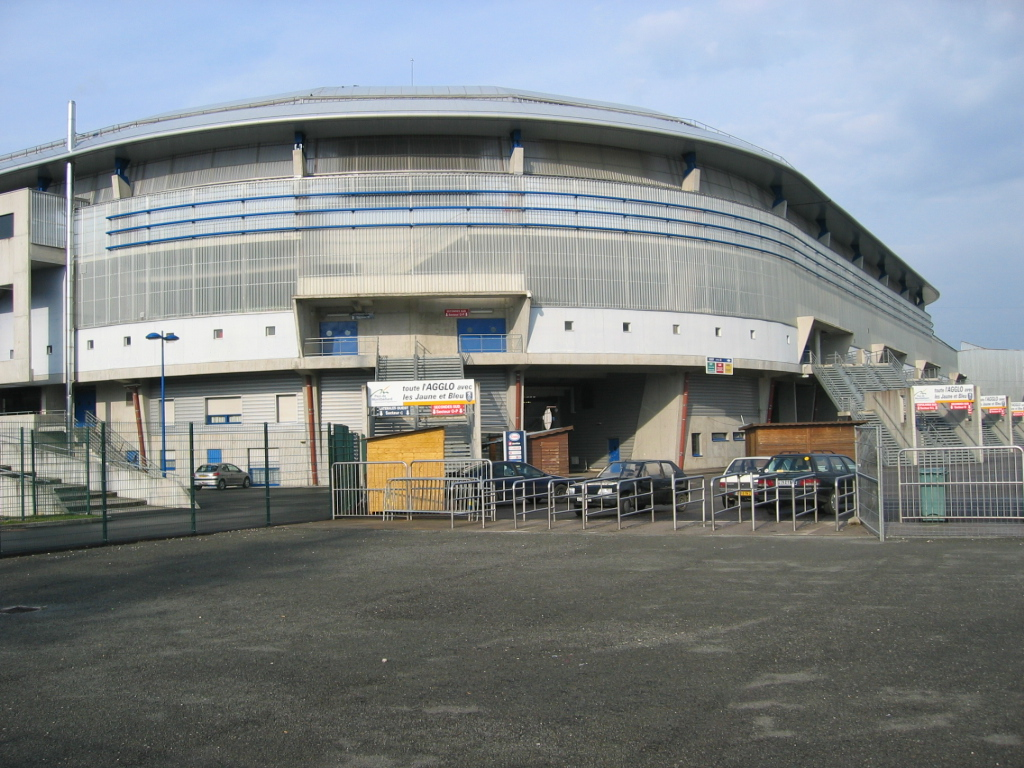
Entrance to the Stade Bonal

Sochaux plays its home matches at the Stade Auguste Bonal in Montbéliard. The stadium was constructed in 1931 and opened on 11 November of that same year. The facility was previously known as Stade de la Forge. In July 1945, the club changed the stadium's name to its current version. It is named after Auguste Bonal, the former sports director of the club, who after refusing to co-operate with the Germans during World War II, was murdered.

The Stade Auguste Bonal has undergone renovations twice: in 1973 and 1997. In 1997, the majority of the stadium was completely overhauled, and practically a new stadium was built. The stadium still hosted matches during the renovation period, but with a limited capacity. The renovation cost ₣114 million, and took nearly three years to complete. The Nouveau Bonal was officially inaugurated on 22 July 2000 in a Trophée des champions match between FC Nantes and AS Monaco. The stadium's current capacity is 20,005.

== Honours and records ==
=== Honours ===
The following table lists the honours of FC Sochaux-Montbéliard, updated as of 1 January 2010, in various official competitions at the national and international levels, as well as in youth competitions. In friendly tournaments, the club won the Coupe Peugeot in 1931 and was a finalist in the Trophée Joan Gamper in 1989.

Honors of FC Sochaux-Montbéliard in Official Competitions
National Competitions

Ligue 1

- Winners (2): 1934–35, 1937–38
- Runners-up (3): 1936–37, 1952–53, 1979–80

Ligue 2

- Winners (3): 1946–47, 1987–88, 2000–01
- Runners-up (1): 1963–64

Ligue 3

- Runners-up (1): 2025–26

Coupe de France

- Winners (2): 1936–37, 2006–07
- Runners-up (3): 1958–59, 1966–67, 1987–88

Coupe de la Ligue

- Winners (1): 2003–04
- Runners-up (1): 2002–03

Coupe Gambardella

- Winners (3): 1982–83, 2006–07, 2014–15
- Runners-up (2): 1974–75, 2009–10

Coupe Charles Drago

- Winners (3): 1952–53, 1962–63, 1963–64

Coupe Peugeot

- Winners (1): 1930–31
International Competitions

UEFA Cup

- Semi-finalists (1): 1980–81

UEFA Intertoto Cup

- Semi-finalists (1): 2001–02

Coupe des Alpes

- Runners-up (1): 1980–81

Mohammed V Cup

- Winners (1): 1988–89

=== National records ===
- Largest victory: 12-1, on 25 August 1935, against Valenciennes
- Youngest player to achieve a hat-trick: Jérémy Ménez, on 22 January 2005 against Bordeaux at 17 years 8 months and 15 days

=== Club records ===
- Most consecutive seasons in Ligue 2: 9 (2014–2023)
- Largest home victory: 12-1, Sochaux vs. Valenciennes, 1935/1936 (Ligue 1)
- Largest away victory: 1-7, Lyon vs. Sochaux, 1987/1988 (Ligue 2)
- Largest home defeat: 0-5, Sochaux vs. Monaco, 1994/1995 (Ligue 1)
  1-6, Sochaux vs. Ajaccio, 2017/2018 (Ligue 2)
  1-6, Sochaux vs. Rennes, 2023/2024 (French Cup)
- Largest away defeat: 8-0, RC Paris vs. Sochaux, 1959/1960 (Ligue 1)
- Most appearances (all competitions): Albert Rust (454 matches)
- Most goals scored (all competitions): Roger Courtois (281 goals)
- Youngest player in an official match: Eliezer Mayenda (16 years, 7 months, and 10 days).

== Players ==
=== Current squad ===
As of 8 September 2026

Note: Flags indicate national team as defined under FIFA eligibility rules; some limited exceptions apply. Players may hold more than one non-FIFA nationality.

No.	Pos.	Nation	Player
2	DF	GUI	Mohamed Touré
3	DF	FRA	Dalangunypole Gomis (on loan from Cercle Brugge)
4	DF	FRA	Arthur Vitelli
5	FW	FRA	Samy Baghdadi
7	FW	FRA	Benjamin Gomel
8	MF	COD	Honoré Bayanginisa
9	FW	FRA	Kapit Djoco
10	FW	FRA	Boubacar Fofana
11	FW	HAI	Louicius Deedson
14	DF	FRA	Mathieu Peybernes
15	MF	MTQ	Jonathan Mexique
16	GK	FRA	Matthis Schübler-Lecart
17	DF	COM	Benjaloud Youssouf
19	MF	FRA	Victor Lobry
21	MF	ESP	Bakary Diawara

No.	Pos.	Nation	Player
23	MF	FRA	Julien Masson
24	MF	FRA	Yohan Demoncy
25	MF	SEN	Pape Yatma Diop
26	DF	FRA	Élie N'Gatta
29	FW	FRA	Ethan Cortes
30	GK	HAI	Alexandre Pierre
40	GK	ALG	Mehdi Jeannin
42	DF	CPV	Dylan Tavares
44	FW	FRA	Noa Kotto Kotto
47	FW	FRA	Julien Vetro
77	FW	CIV	Landry Nomel
91	FW	FRA	Mathis Clairicia
92	FW	FRA	Victor Monthieu
97	DF	MAR	Saad Agouzoul

=== Out on loan ===
Note: Flags indicate national team as defined under FIFA eligibility rules; some limited exceptions apply. Players may hold more than one non-FIFA nationality.

No. / Pos. / Nation / Player; — / DF / FRA / Enzo-Noël Dodé (at Paris 13 Atletico until 30 June 2027)	No. / Pos. / Nation / Player; — / FW / MLI / Aboubacar Sidibé (at Paris 13 Atletico until 30 June 2027)

=== Notable former players ===
Below are the notable former players who have represented Sochaux in league and international competition since the club's foundation in 1928. To appear in the section below, a player must have played in at least 200 official matches for the club.

For a complete list of Sochaux players, see Category:FC Sochaux-Montbéliard players

- (Democratic Republic of the Congo) Cedric Bakambu
- (France) Philippe Anziani
- (France) Eugène Battmann
- (France) Olivier Baudry
- (Bosnia and Herzegovina) Mehmed Baždarević
- (France) Éric Benoît
- (France) Serge Bourdoncle
- (France) Roger Courtois
- (France) Laurent Croci
- (Senegal) Omar Daf
- (Algeria) Abdel Djaadaoui
- (France) Thierry Fernier
- (France) Maxence Flachez
- (France) Pierre-Alain Frau
- (France) René Gardien
- (France) Bernard Genghini
- (Bosnia and Herzegovina) Faruk Hadžibegić
- (France) Fabrice Henry
- (France) Michaël Isabey
- (Socialist Federal Republic of Yugoslavia) Zvonko Ivezić
- (France) Pierre Lechantre
- (France) Philippe Lucas
- (France) Erwan Manac'h
- (France) Bernard Maraval
- (France) Jérémy Mathieu
- (Socialist Federal Republic of Yugoslavia) Vojislav Melić
- (France) Jérémy Ménez
- (Brazil) Miranda
- (France) Stéphane Paille
- (France) Benoît Pedretti
- (Croatia) Ivan Perisic
- (France) Romain Pitau
- (France) Jean-Pierre Posca
- (France) Maxence Prévot
- (France) Claude Quittet
- (France) Albert Rust
- (France) Jean-Luc Ruty
- (Luxembourg) Adolphe Schmit
- (Socialist Federal Republic of Yugoslavia) Laszlo Seleš
- (France) Franck Silvestre
- (France) Yannick Stopyra
- (France) Joseph Tellechéa
- (France) Jean-Christophe Thomas
- (France) Marcel Wassmer
- (Morocco) Jaouad Zairi

== Honours ==
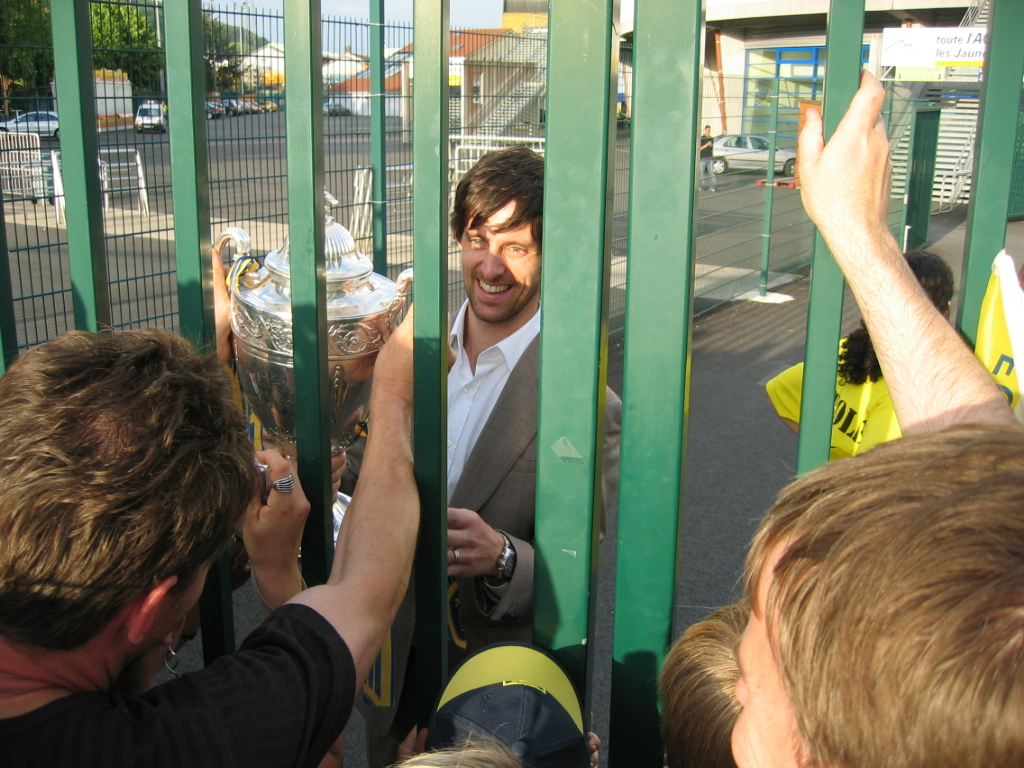
Jérémie Bréchet, with the club's 2007 Coupe de France trophy.

=== Domestic ===
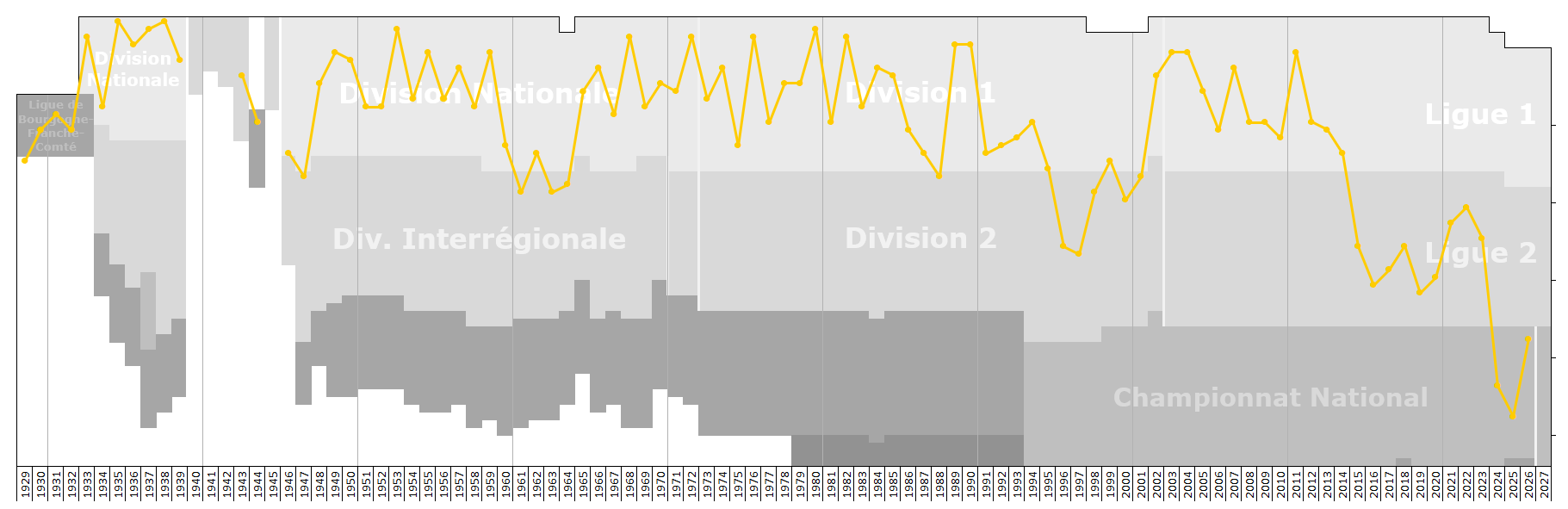
Historical league performance chart of FC Sochaux-Montbéliard

- Ligue 1
  - Champions: 1934–35, 1937–38
- Ligue 2
  - Champions: 1946–47, 1987–88 (Group A), 2000–01
- Coupe de France
  - Champions: 1936–37, 2006–07
  - Runners-up: 1958–59, 1966–67, 1987–88
- Coupe de la Ligue
  - Champions: 2003–04
  - Runners-up: 2002–03
- Trophée des Champions
  - Runners-up: 2007
- Coupe Charles Drago
  - Champions: 1953, 1963, 1964

=== Other ===
- Coupe Peugeot
  - Champions (1): 1931
- Mohammed V Cup
  - Champions (1): 1989
- Joan Gamper Trophy
  - Runners-up (1): 1989

== Management and staff ==
Senior club staff

- President: Clément Calvez

Coaching staff

- Head coach: Vincent Hognon
- Assistant coaches: Ali Boumnijel and Stéphane Mangione
- Goalkeeping coach: Gérard Gnanhouan

=== Managerial history ===
Dates	Name
1928–29	Maurice Bailly
1929–34	Victor Gibson
1934	Maurice Bailly
1934–36	Conrad Ross
1936	André Abegglen
1936–39	Conrad Ross
1939–44	Paul Wartel
1944–46	Étienne Mattler
1946–52	Paul Wartel
1952–57	Gaby Dormois
1957–60	Paul Wartel
1960–62	Ludwig Dupal
1962–66	Roger Hug
1966–67	Georges Vuillaume
1967–69	Dobroslav Krstić
1969–77	Paul Barret
1977–81	Jean Fauvergue
1981–84	Pierre Mosca
1984–85	Silvester Takač
1985–87	Jean Fauvergue
1987	Paul Barret
1987–94	Silvester Takač

Dates	Name
9 December 1994 – 30 June 1995	Jacques Santini
1 July 1995 – 30 June 1996	Didier Notheaux
1 July 1996 – 4 October 1998	Faruk Hadžibegić
5 October 1998 – 31 August 1999	Philippe Anziani
1 September 1999 – 30 June 2002	Jean Fernandez
1 July 2002 – 6 July 2005	Guy Lacombe
7 July 2005 – 16 May 2006	Dominique Bijotat
1 August 2006 – 30 June 2007	Alain Perrin
1 July 2007 – 12 December 2007	Frédéric Hantz
12 December 2007 – 31 December 2007	Jean-Luc Ruty (caretaker)
2 January 2008 – 5 June 2011	Francis Gillot
10 June 2011 – 6 March 2012	Mehmed Baždarević
6 March 2012 – 26 September 2013	Eric Hély
27 September 2013 – 7 October 2013	Omar Daf (caretaker)
7 October 2013 – 18 May 2014	Hervé Renard
1 July 2014 – 15 September 2015	Olivier Echouafni
September 2015	Omar Daf & Eric Hély (caretakers)
October 2015–May 2017	Albert Cartier
June 2017–May 2018	Peter Zeidler
May 2018–Nov 2018	José Manuel Aira
November 2018–June 2022	Omar Daf
June 2022–May 2023	Olivier Guégan
May 2023–June 2023	Pierre-Alain Frau
July 2023–June 2024	Oswald Tanchot
July 2024–Feb 2025	Karim Mokeddem
February 2025–June 2025	Frédéric Bompard
July 2025–	Vincent Hognon

== See also ==
- Works team
