= ÉF Nancy-Lorraine =

French football club

Équipe Fédérale Nancy-Lorraine was a French football team in existence between 1943 and 1944. They won the 1944 Coupe de France Final and they no longer exist.
