= Yuzu bath =

Japanese winter solstice bathing tradition

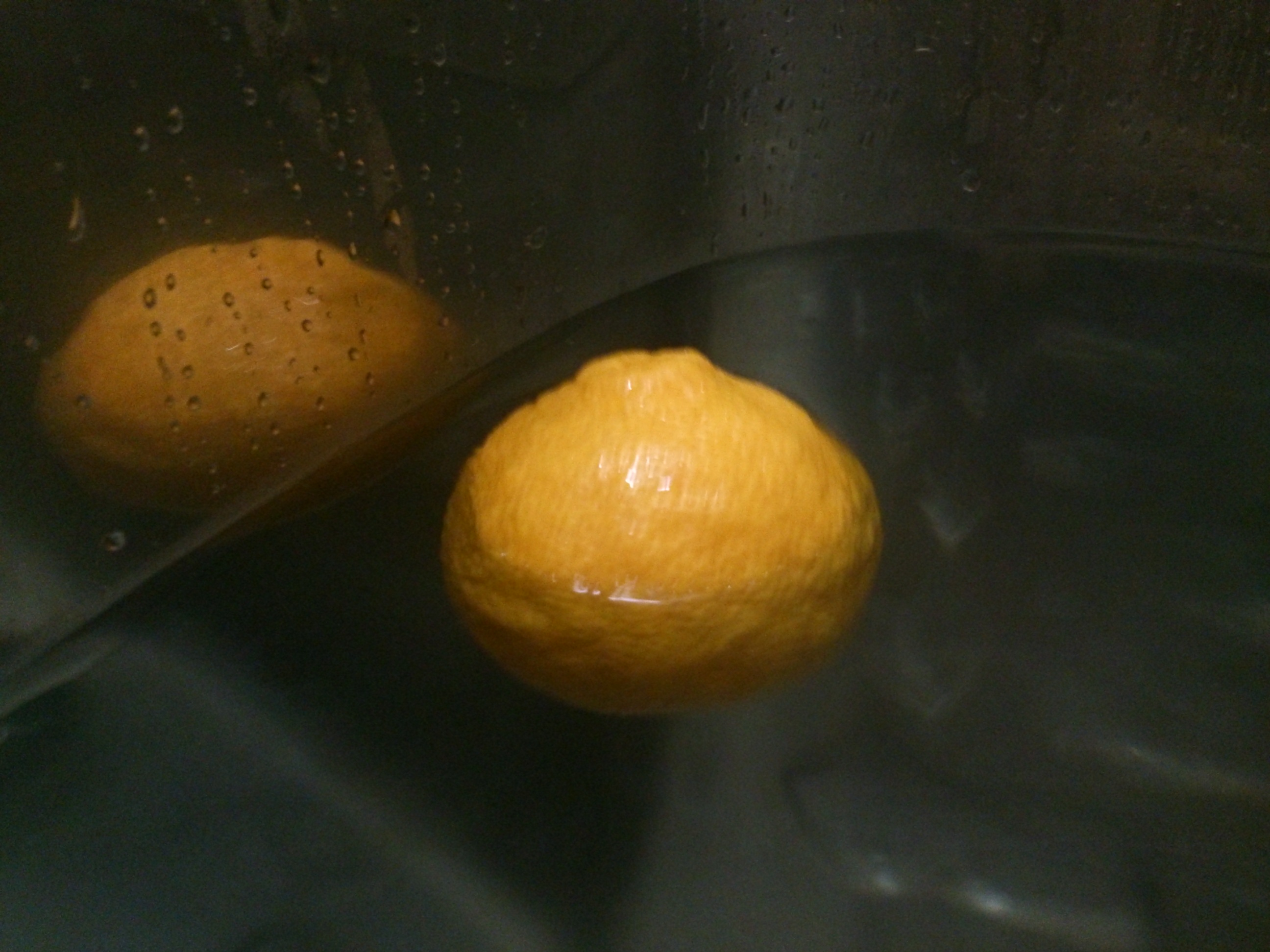
Yuzu in bath water

A yuzu bath, also known as a yuzuyu (柚子湯), is a bathing tradition that is celebrated on the winter solstice in Japan. Yuzu fruits, citrus fruit of East Asian origin known for their characteristically strong aroma and the fragrant oil from their skin (nomilin), are floated in the hot water of the bath, releasing their aroma. The fruit may also be floated cut in half, allowing the citrus juice to mingle with the bathwater and color it yellow-orange, or enclosed in a cloth bag. Alternatively, yuzu-scented bath salts are used. Yuzu baths are believed to guard against colds, treat the roughness of skin, warm the body, and relax the mind.

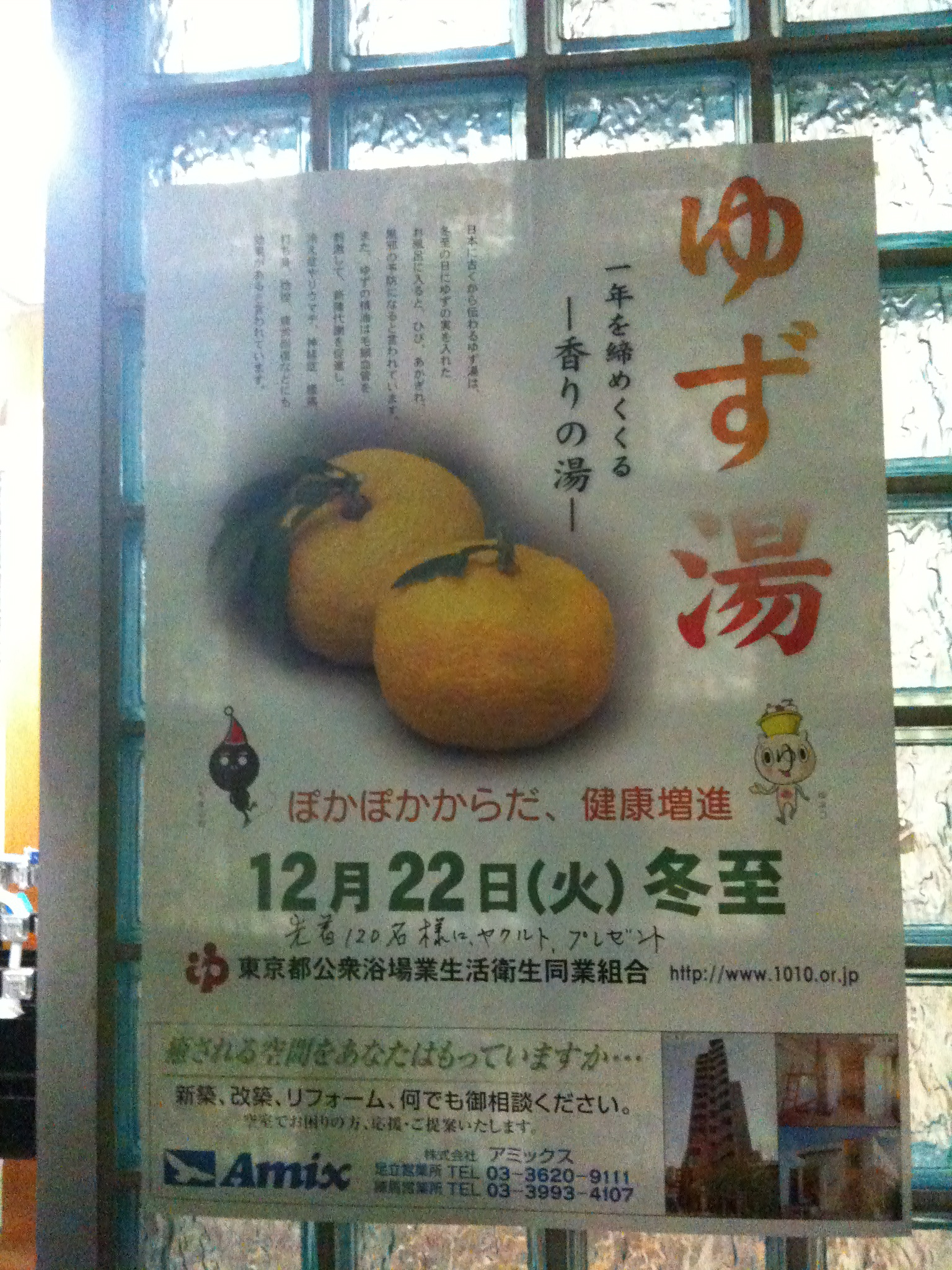
A Japanese flyer advertising yuzu bath at Shinbashiyu in Ebisu

== History ==
The custom of sitting in yuzu baths on the winter solstice originates from the Japanese tradition of adding seasonal plants to bath water for medicinal or therapeutic purposes as well as general enjoyment. Yuzu baths, originating to the Edo period (1603–1867), may have been inspired by the goroawase (語呂合わせ, lit. "phonetic matching") of the characters for the words “winter solstice” (冬至) and “hot-spring cure” (湯治), both of which can be read as tōji.

== Use by animals ==
=== Capybara baths ===
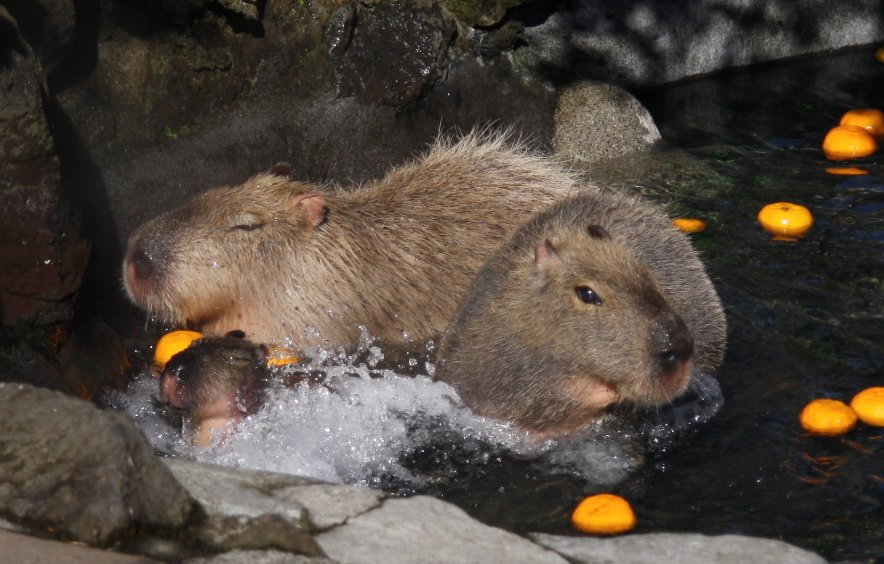
Capybaras swimming in the yuzu bath at the Izu Shaboten Zoo.

In 1982 at the Izu Shaboten Zoo in Itō, Shizuoka, Japan, an employee cleaning the capybara enclosure with hot water noticed the animals huddling together in a warm puddle. Capybaras develop rough dry skin in the winter. Capybaras originally live in the climate of high-temperature and high-humidity, and they spend a lot of time underwater. Capybaras prefer to soak in a hot spring in the cold winter. Hot spring bathing has a beneficial effect on their skin in winter. Continuing on since the year it started, employees will prepare a yuzu bath for the capybaras during the winter. The Izu Shaboten Zoo is the first zoo to feature these, and other zoos have also followed.

Since 2020, videos of the capybara baths have been heavily shared across the internet on social media websites such as Twitter and YouTube and have gained millions of views.

These bathing capybaras spawned a series of merchandise such as plush toys, and provided inspiration for the anime character Kapibara-san.
