= Hydrochoerus gaylordi =

Scientific classification
- Kingdom: Animalia
- Phylum: Chordata
- Class: Mammalia
- Order: Rodentia
- Family: Caviidae
- Genus: Hydrochoerus
- Species: H. gaylordi

Binomial name
- Hydrochoerus gaylordi MacPhee et al., 2000

Extinct species of rodent

Hydrochoerus gaylordi (named after hotelier Joseph Gaylord) is an extinct species of capybara that lived in Grenada during the Late Pliocene to Early Pleistocene. This species was found in 1991 by Ronald Singer and his colleagues based on a maxilla bearing 3 molars, but it was not named until 2000. It may be invalid and a synonym of the extant greater capybara.

== Discovery and naming ==
Fossils of Hydrochoerus gaylordi were first collected in 1991 by American paleontologist Robert Singer and party from a cliff face on the property of the 12° North Hotel in Lance aux Épines, southern Grenada, where fossils of megalonychid sloths were discovered earlier by the son of the hotel owner in the late 70's. The H. gaylordi fossils consisted only of a partial maxilla preserving M1-M3 that was donated to the American Museum of Natural History, where it is deposited under specimen number AMNH-VP 132713. The geologic dating of the fossils is uncertain, but the cliff strata is composed of volcanic smectite clay that dates from between the Late Pliocene and Early Pleistocene (2.7–3.6 Ma), though the fossils most likely date to the former age. The species was described in 2000 by R. D. E. MacPhee, Ronald Singer, the collector of the fossils, and Michael Diamond during a comprehensive description of the fossils found at North Hotel.

The species name "gaylordi" is after American political consultant and co-owner of the 12° North Hotel Joseph Gaylord for allowing fossil excavation on the property and Gaylord's donations to the American Museum of Natural History.

== Description ==
Due to the lack of preserved material, few traits distinguish this species from other kinds of capybara. The only known specimen is a partial maxilla retaining M1-M3. The species is diagnosed by its occlusal pattern, in which the buccal connection of its M2 lamellae is not lost during ontogeny, making it a neotenic trait. Typically in capybaras, the buccal connection in the lamellae is present in younger individuals but is lost by the time they become juveniles to make them more hypsodont. H. gaylordi was a smaller species of capybara, possibly due to it being an insular species.

=== Validity ===
However, reanalysis in 2013 found this diagnostic trait to be simply ontogenetic variation as the maxilla could be from a juvenile based on size, meaning the species could be a synonym of Hydrochoerus hydrochaeris. More material and new analyses are required to solve the issue.

== Paleobiogeography and evolution ==
Grenada is an island in the Lesser Antilles that typically has smaller mammals and few large mammals, so when fossils of capybaras and ground sloths were discovered, several theories as how these animal groups colonized Grenada were developed. In 1999 it was hypothesized that a land bridge was present between South America and Grenada, but this theory has been debunked. During the Late Pliocene to Early Pleistocene, sea levels were much lower, making Grenada an island ca. 4,000–4,500 km^{2}. This also made the distances between Grenada and South America much smaller and the water more shallow, possibly granting access for migration. Capybaras are very well adapted for aquatic travel and have possibly colonized islands like Curaco by water previously, although extant capybaras are typically found in shallow, freshwater environments, they perform well as swimmers. After their separation from the mainland, the colonizing capybaras could have evolved into their own species.

== Paleoenvironment ==
The island of Grenada is the southernmost island in the Antilles archipelago, bordering the eastern Caribbean Sea and western Atlantic Ocean, and roughly 140 km (90 mi) north of both Venezuela and Trinidad and Tobago. Grenada is a volcanic island, and the strata the fossils of H. gaylordi were collected from were made of volcanic ash. Few mammals are known from Grenada and many of the extant taxa were introduced to the island after European colonization. Extinct mammals that lived alongside H. gaylordi include the Caribbean Monk Seal, which went extinct in 1952, and an unnamed megalonychid sloth known only from teeth. Extant mammals include 11 species of bats, including fruit bats and myotis, nine-banded armadillos, Robinson's mouse opossums, and a great amount of cetaceans like baleen whales and dolphins. The avian faunas are much more diverse, even having a bird species, the Grenada dove, that is entirely endemic to the islands. Grenada's flora is made up of a diverse array of forests, including cloud forests, woodlands, and coastal scrubs, most of the tallest forests being on the mountainous areas of the island.
