= Izu Shaboten Zoo =

Zoo and botanical garden in Itō, Shizuoka, Japan

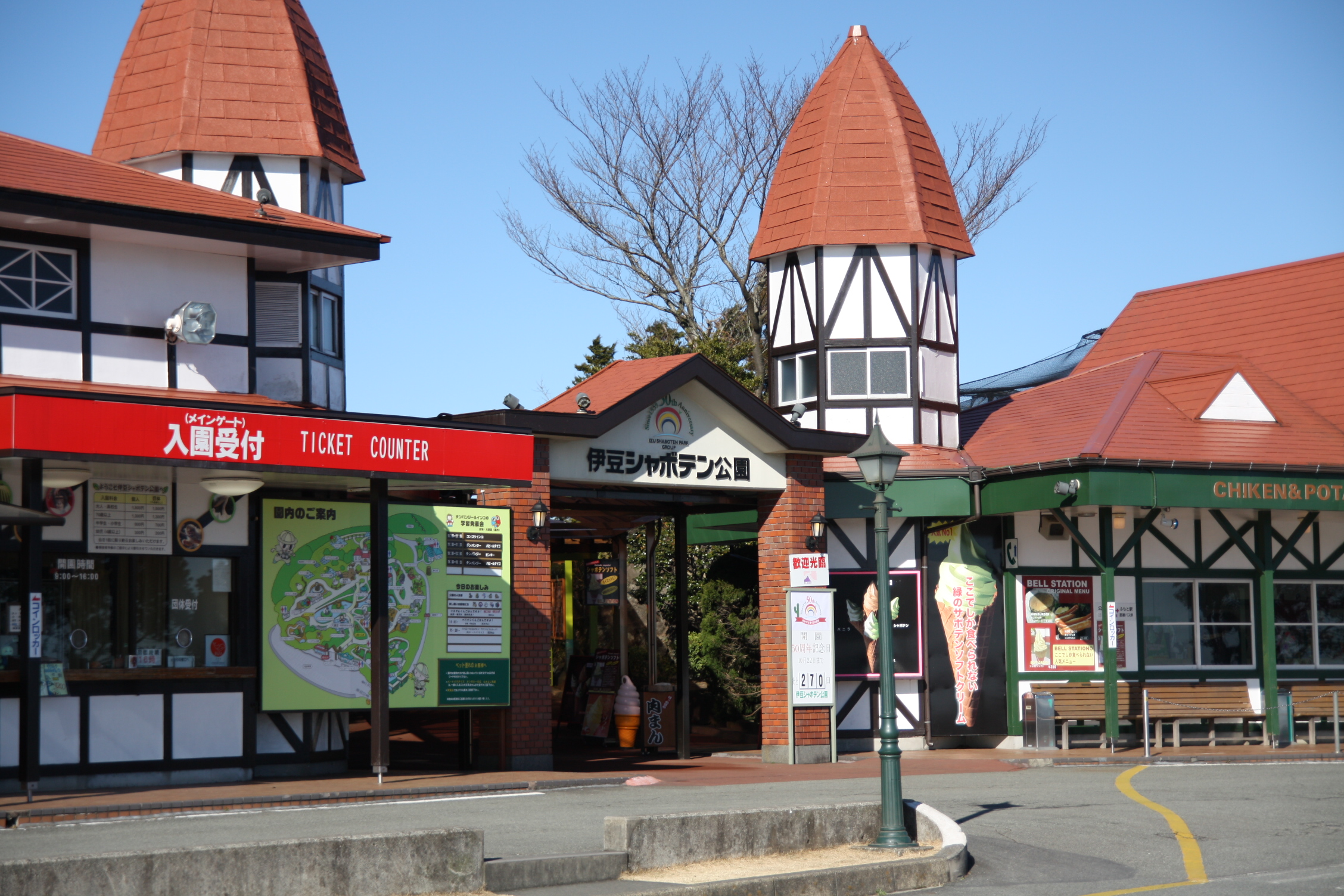
- Izu Shaboten Zoo entrance gate during the zoo's 50th anniversary in 2009
- Interactive map of Izu Shaboten Zoo
- 34°54′26″N 139°06′03″E
- Date opened: 1959; 67 years ago
- Location: Itō, Shizuoka, Japan
- No. of animals: ~800
- No. of species: ~140
- Owner: Izu Shaboten Resort Co., Ltd.
- Website: izushaboten.com

Izu Shaboten Zoo (Japanese: 伊豆シャボテン動物公園, Hepburn: Izu Shaboten Dōbutsukōen) (Note: lit. "Izu Cactus Zoo") is a zoological park and botanical garden in Itō, Shizuoka, Japan. Founded in 1959, the zoo is currently notable for its exhibited capybaras and succulent greenhouses and is open year-round.

== History ==
The Izu Shaboten Zoo was founded in 1959. It is named for its location on the Izu Peninsula while shaboten (シャボテン) is a Japanese word that commonly referred to cacti up until the 1960s. The word saboten (サボテン) is more often used, however the zoo retained its name since its opening.

== Animals ==
The Izu Shaboten Zoo has a total of about 800 animals of 140 species, including monkeys, parrots, flamingos, fennec foxes, capybaras, penguins, peacocks, kangaroos, sloths, anteaters, coatis, and red pandas.

=== Capybaras ===
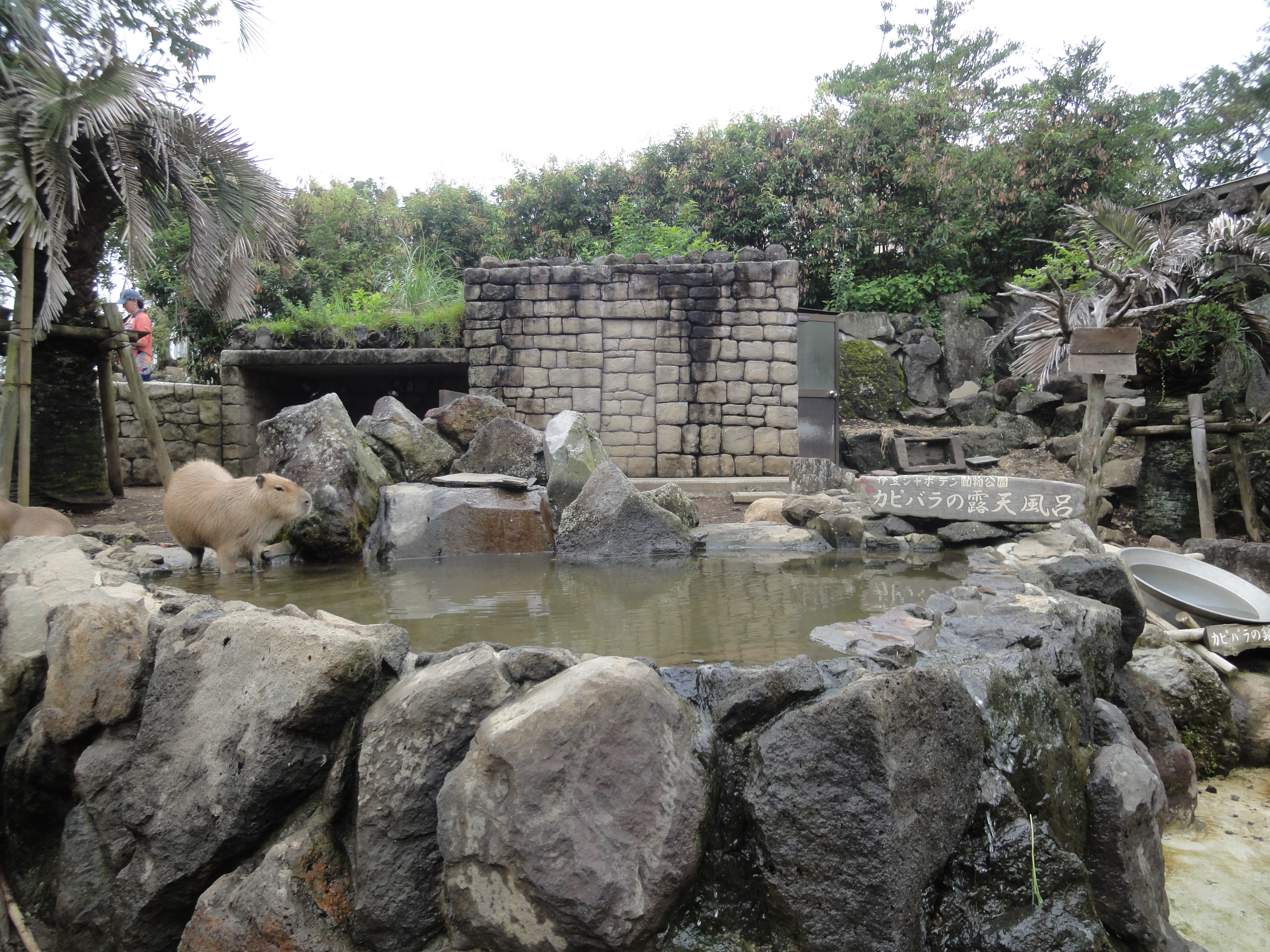
The yuzu bath

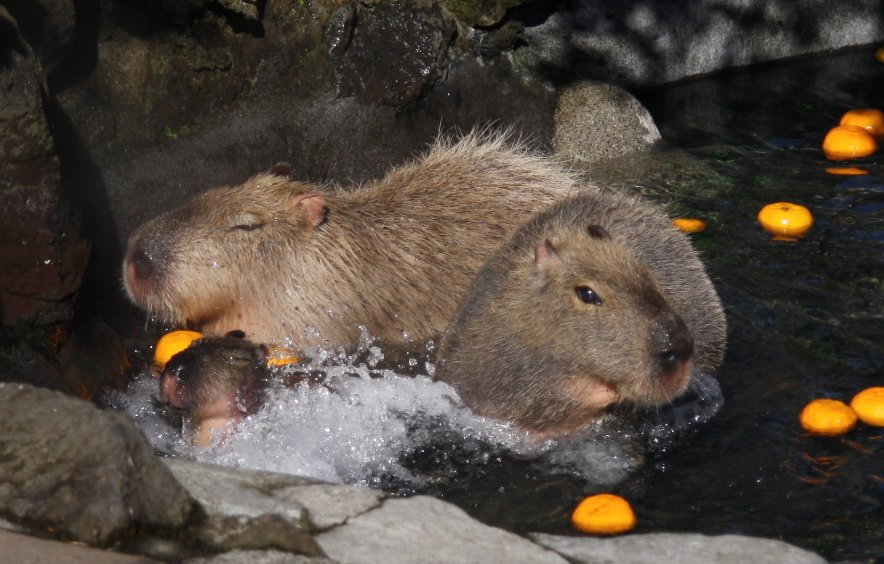
Capybaras swimming in the yuzu bath

One of the zoo's most popular animals is the capybara, a large semi-aquatic rodent native to South America. The zoo features a hot spring known as the "capybara bath", open for visitors to view. It was created in 1982 when an employee cleaning the enclosure with hot water noticed the capybaras huddling together in a warm puddle. Continuing on since the year it started, employees will prepare a warm yuzu bath for the capybaras during winter and early spring. The Izu Shaboten Zoo is the first zoo to have this, and other zoos now also feature it.

The capybaras have influenced a character named Kapibara-san, and a series of merchandise based on the character, such as plush toys. Video clips of the capybaras have gained millions of views.

=== Shows and tours ===
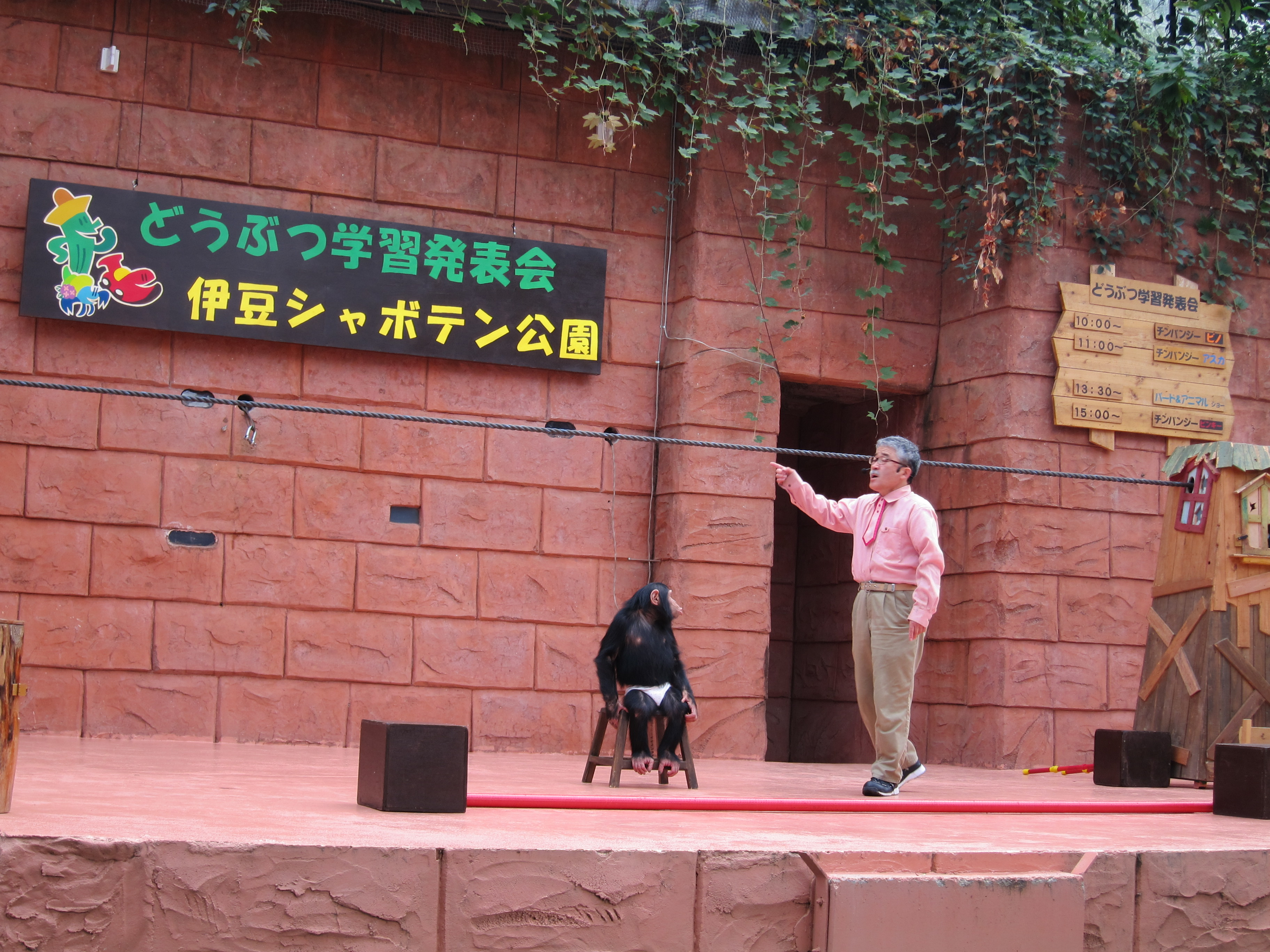
An animal show at Izu Shaboten Zoo

The zoo has two boat tours to and around animal exhibits in the zoo:

- Around the Lake – a tour around the zoo's lake hosted by a tour guide
- Monkey Island – a boat ride to where visitors can feed monkeys exhibited on an island

Hosted at the zoo are different types animal shows with dogs, parrots, and monkeys.

== Succulent greenhouses ==
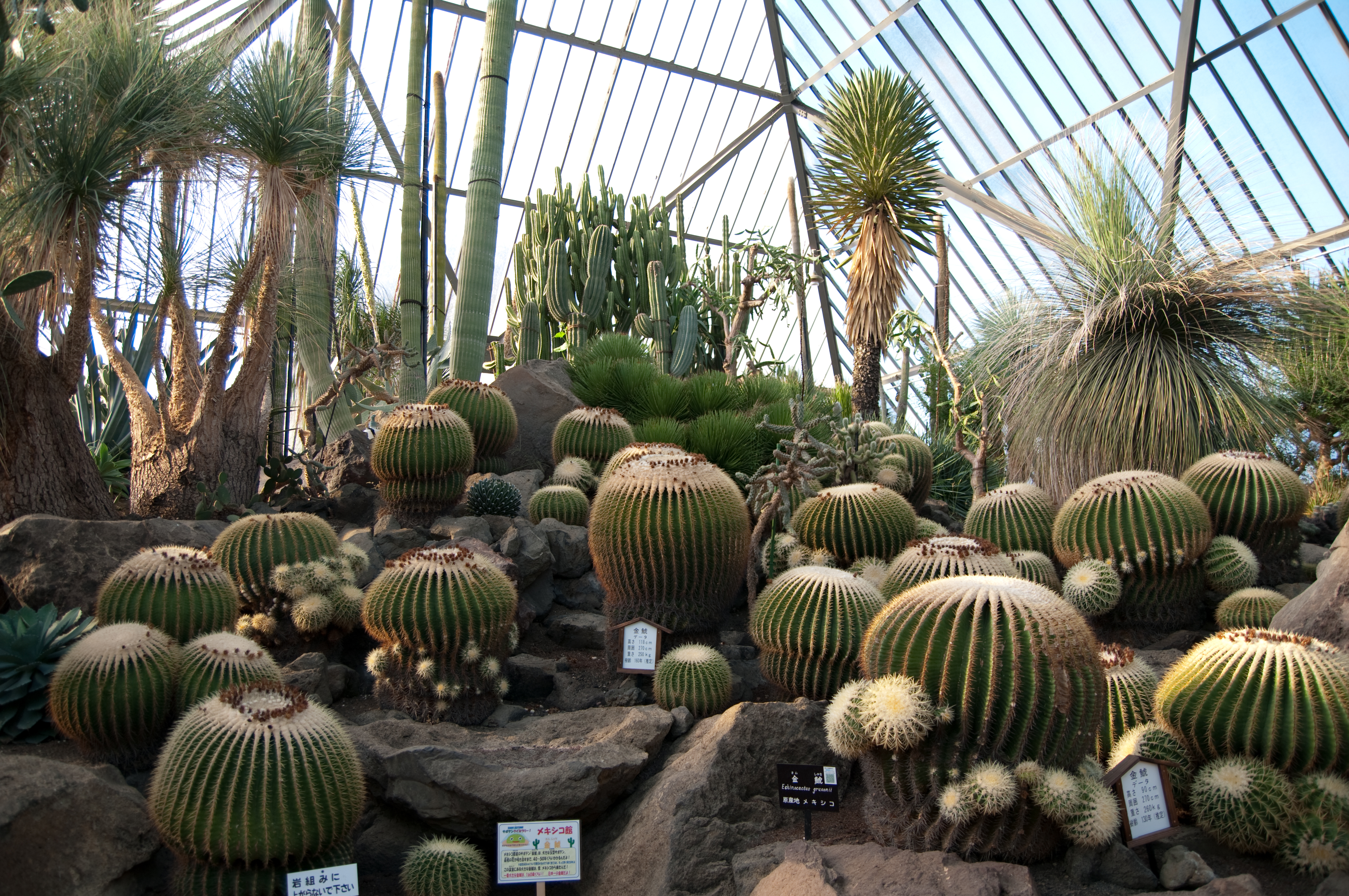
Mexico Greenhouse

The zoo has over 1,500 different cactus species and other succulents as well as other plants throughout five different greenhouses, listed in order of arrangement along the pathway:

- Mexico Greenhouse – the largest of the five, contains over 150 different cacti species from Mexico and other nearby regions of North America
- Madagascar Greenhouse – contains plants such as aloe and other succulents from Madagascar
- Forest Cacti Greenhouse – contains cacti species from jungle regions
- South America Greenhouse – contains cacti species from South America
- Africa Greenhouse – contains succulent species and other plants from Africa as well as the dragon blood tree from Socotra, Yemen

At the end of the greenhouses is a garden where visitors can purchase pots and pick cacti and other succulents.

== Amenities ==
The zoo has five restaurants—Bell Station, Café Sherry, Chao, Gibbontei (Forest Animal Restaurant), and Hanamasubi—and the Animal Mart gift shop.

=== Forest Animal Restaurant ===
Gibbontei, also called the Forest Animal Restaurant, is the zoo's main restaurant. It serves meals such as a capybara-shaped hamburger and a cactus-shaped curry made from the plant itself. In 2020 during the COVID-19 pandemic, the restaurant famously used large plush capybaras to encourage social distancing inside the restaurant.
