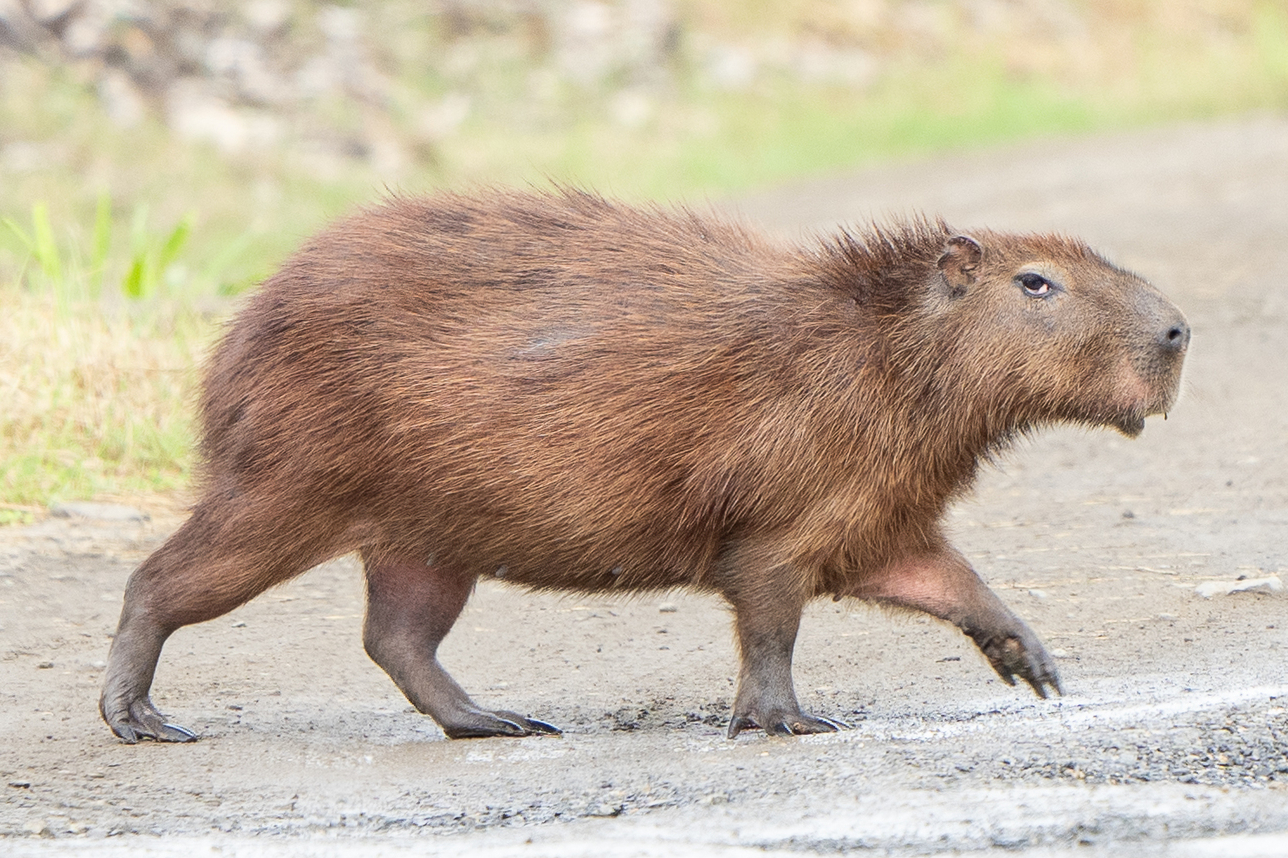
- In Gamboa, Panama

Conservation status
- Data Deficient (IUCN 3.1)

Scientific classification
- Kingdom: Animalia
- Phylum: Chordata
- Class: Mammalia
- Order: Rodentia
- Family: Caviidae
- Genus: Hydrochoerus
- Species: H. isthmius

Binomial name
- Hydrochoerus isthmius Goldman, 1912
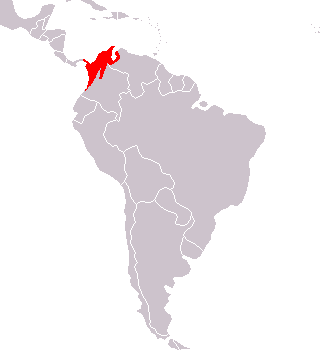
- Range

= Lesser capybara =

Species of rodent

The lesser capybara (Hydrochoerus isthmius) is a large semi-aquatic rodent found in South America that has vast similarities with and subtle differences from the slightly larger common capybara (Hydrochoerus hydrochaeris), which is the largest species of rodent in the world.

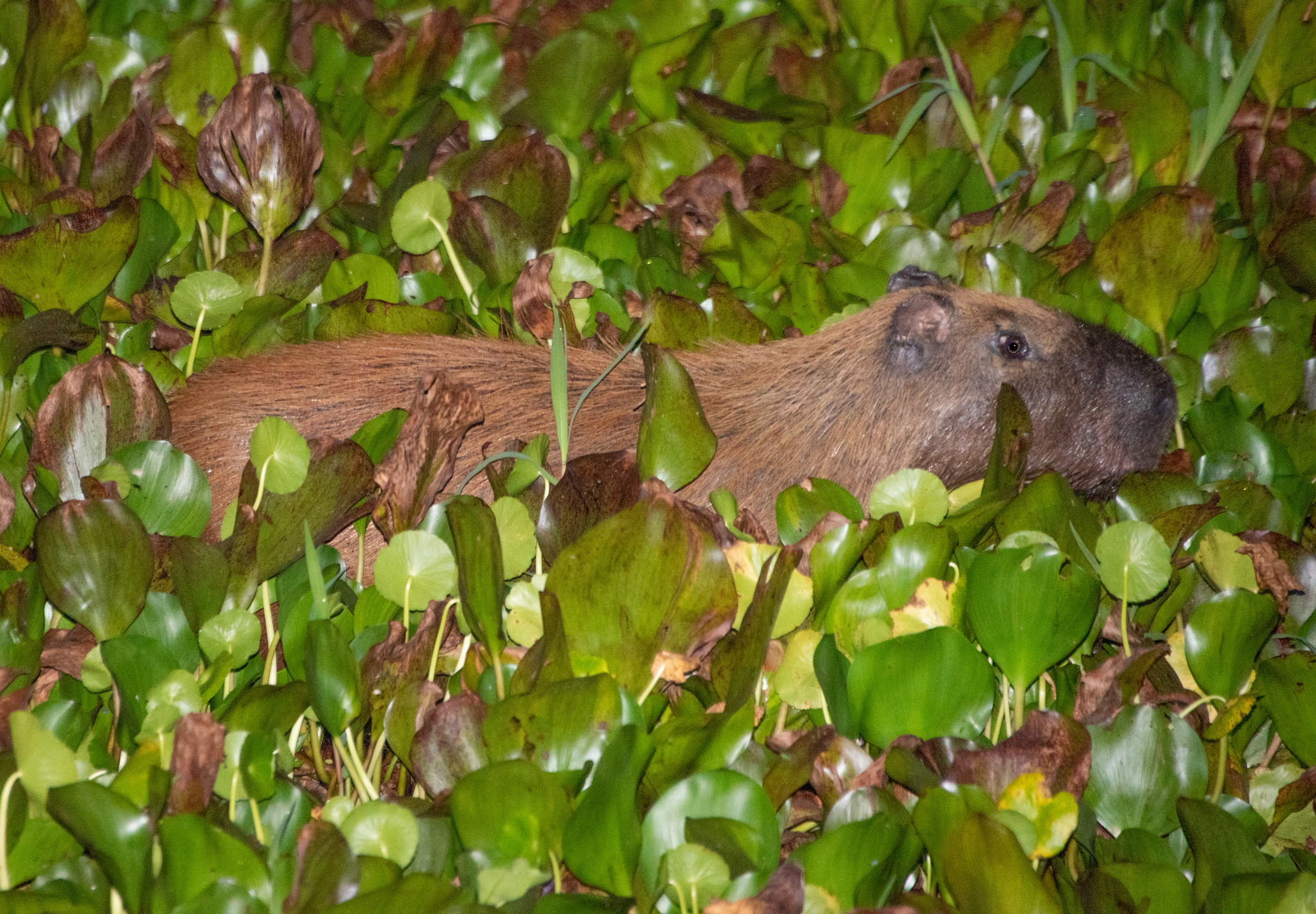
Lesser capybara

== Habitat ==
The lesser capybara mainly inhabits areas close to water such as marshes, ponds, and lagoon habitats as they contain water, which is essential for these animals to maintain body temperature homeostasis, provide suitable food, hide from predators, and mate. They were first observed in Pacific river valleys in Panama as early as 1912 as a subspecies of the common capybara. However, after thorough studies on their anatomy and genealogy, the lesser capybara was classified as its own species some time in the 1980s. Currently, this species has expanded its range to parts of Eastern Panama, Western Colombia, and Venezuela, just west of the Andes Mountains. The lesser capybara constitutes the northernmost population of any extant capybara species other than the now extinct H. hesperotiganites from Pleistocene California.

== Diet ==
Lesser capybaras are herbivores that mainly graze on grasses and other aquatic plants. However, during dry seasons when their main source of food is depleted, they will feed on reeds, grains, melons, and squash. On average, an adult will eat 2.7 to 3.6 kilograms (6 to 8 lb) of this food per day. Although not a main part of their diet, lesser capybaras will also eventually ingest their own feces to gain bacteria that benefits them by breaking down thick fibers.

== Physical description ==
Just like greater capybaras, the lesser capybara is characterized by short, brown hair, with blunt snouts, four short legs (front legs are smaller than hind), partially webbed feet, small eyes and ears situated high on the head, and a very tiny tail. Compared to greater capybaras, the lesser capybara is generally smaller in size, with adults growing up to 90 centimetres (3 ft) in length, weighing up to 28 kilograms (62 lb), and having a darker brown coat.

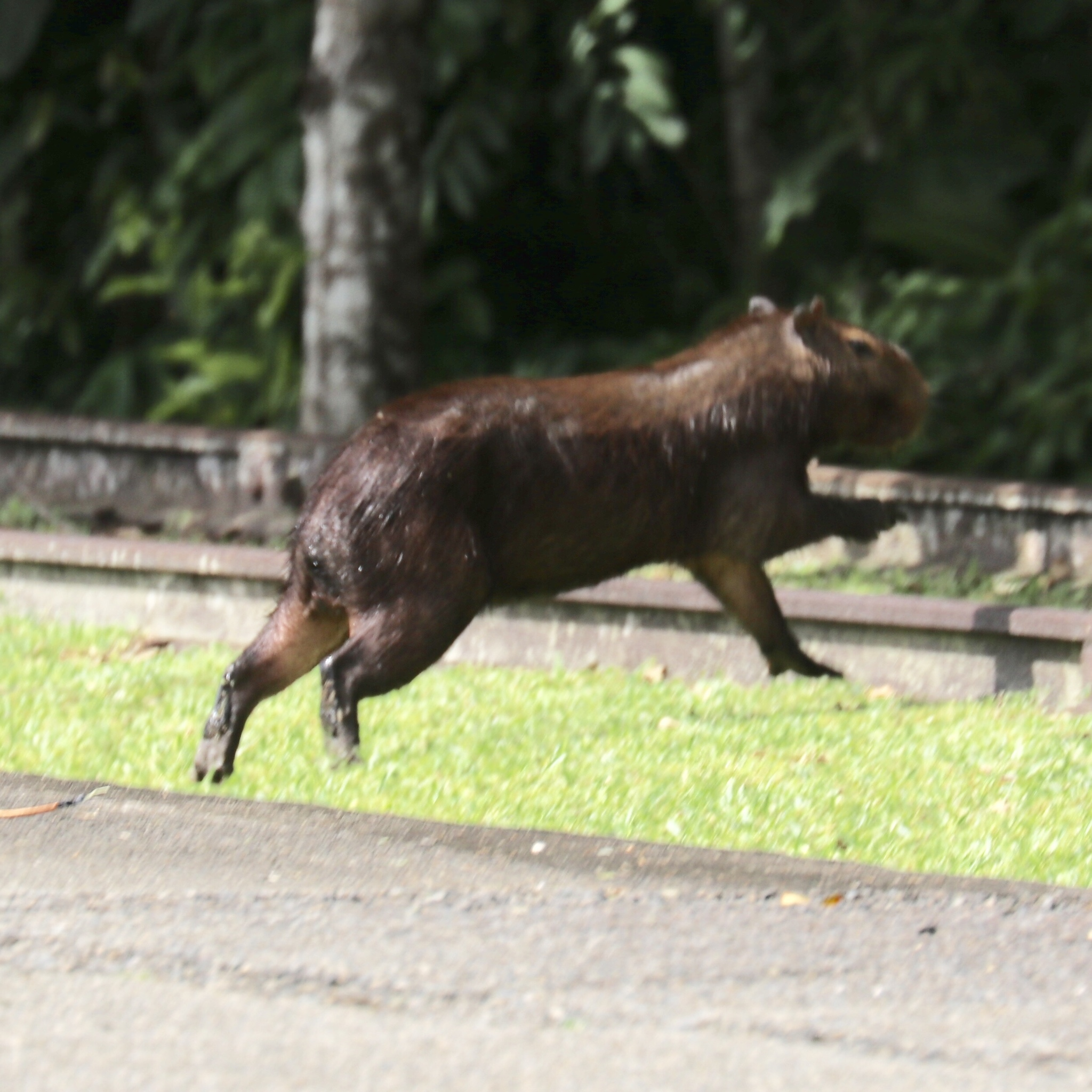
Lesser capybara up close

== Adaptations ==
As animals that are considered prey for many animals, the species is very wary of predators and likes to travel in groups of about 20 cavies. The capybaras have also adapted to be excellent swimmers; they dive regularly in water to avoid predators such as jaguars and green anacondas. Having eyes and ears placed high on their heads, the capybaras can see these predators while in the water. Furthermore, being immersed in water for long periods of time helps the capybaras regulate their body temperature by helping them cool off.

== Mating ==
The lesser capybara breeds year-round, only in water. Lesser capybara females, when in estrus, will whistle through their nose to attract males. Females have a gestation period of roughly 108 days, and they give birth to litters of about 3 to 4 baby pups.
