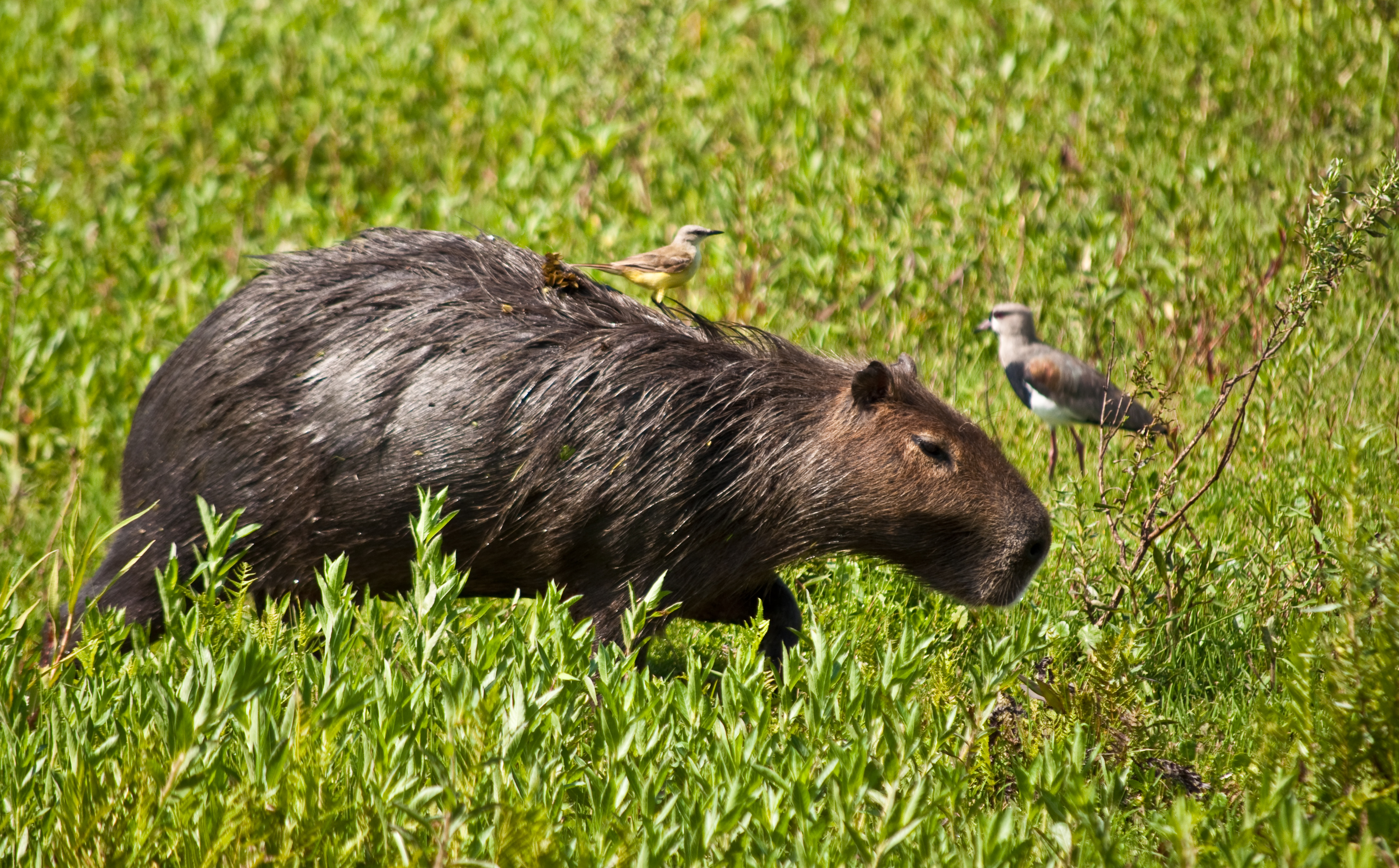
- H. hydrochaeris with a cattle tyrant on its back

Scientific classification
- Kingdom: Animalia
- Phylum: Chordata
- Class: Mammalia
- Order: Rodentia
- Family: Caviidae
- Subfamily: Hydrochoerinae
- Genus: Hydrochoerus; Brisson, 1762

Type species
- Sus hydrochaeris Linnaeus, 1766

Species
- †H. ballesterensis; †H. gaylordi; †H. hesperotiganites; H. hydrochaeris; H. isthmius
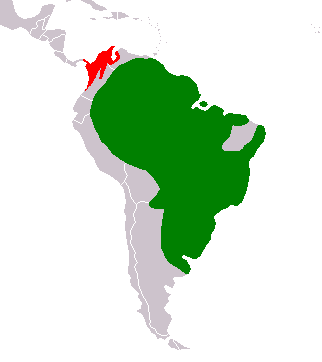
- Ranges of capybara (green) and lesser capybara (red)

= Hydrochoerus =

Hydrochoerus Temporal range: Pliocene - Recent ~3.6–0 Ma

Genus of rodents

The genus Hydrochoerus contains two living (the lesser and greater capybaras) and three extinct species of rodents from South America, the Caribbean island of Grenada, California and Panama. Capybaras are the largest living rodents. The name of the genus is derived from Ancient Greek ὕδωρ (húdor), meaning "water", and χοῖρος (khoîros), meaning "pig".

== Characteristics ==
Capybaras are semiaquatic, found in and near lakes, rivers, swamps, and flooded savanna. Their diets are dominated by grasses. Adults weigh up to 65 kg (143 lb). The gestation period is 130–150 days, with two to eight (most commonly four) young born to females.

== Behavior ==
Capybaras are highly social, living in groups of up to 100 and communicating through a variety of vocalizations. Breeding is polygynous, with males forming harems.

== Phylogeny and taxonomy ==
Molecular results have consistently suggested Hydrochoerus is most closely related to Kerodon (the rock cavies), and the two evolved from within the Caviidae. This led Woods and Kilpatrick to unite the two into the subfamily Hydrochoerinae within the Caviidae. Based on use of a molecular clock approach, Hydrochoerus appears to have diverged from Kerodon in the late Middle Miocene (about 12 million years ago).

The extinct North American species formerly recognized as Hydrochoerus holmesi is now assigned to Neochoerus.

=== Species ===
==== Extant Species ====
Genus Hydrochoerus – Brisson, 1762 – two species
Common name	Scientific name and subspecies	Range	Size and ecology	IUCN status and estimated population
Capybara	Hydrochoerus hydrochaeris (Linnaeus, 1766)	South America	Size: Habitat: Diet:	LC
Lesser capybara	Hydrochoerus isthmius Goldman, 1912	eastern Panama, northwestern Colombia, and western Venezuela.	Size: Habitat: Diet:	DD

==== Fossils ====
- † Hydrochoerus ballesterensis – Pliocene capybara endemic to Argentina
- † Hydrochoerus gaylordi – Plio-Pleistocene capybara endemic to the Caribbean island of Grenada
- † Hydrochoerus hesperotiganites – Late Pleistocene capybara endemic to North America (San Diego County, California)

== Distribution ==
Presently, capybaras live in northern South America and adjacent southern Central America (lesser capybara) and in the tropical to subtropical regions of South America (capybara). The fossil species inhabited Buenos Aires Province in Argentina (H. ballesterensis) and the Caribbean island of Grenada (H. gaylordi). One species, H. hesperotiganites even ranged as far north as California. Fossils of unspecified Hydrochoerus have been found in Late Pleistocene to Holocene sediments of Curití, Santander, at an altitude of 1,500 m (4,900 ft) in the Eastern Ranges of the Colombian Andes. Fauna found at the same site included the South American tapir (Tapirus terrestris), Cryptotis sp., collared peccary (Tayassu tajacu), white-lipped peccary (Tayassu pecari), and Mazama sp.
