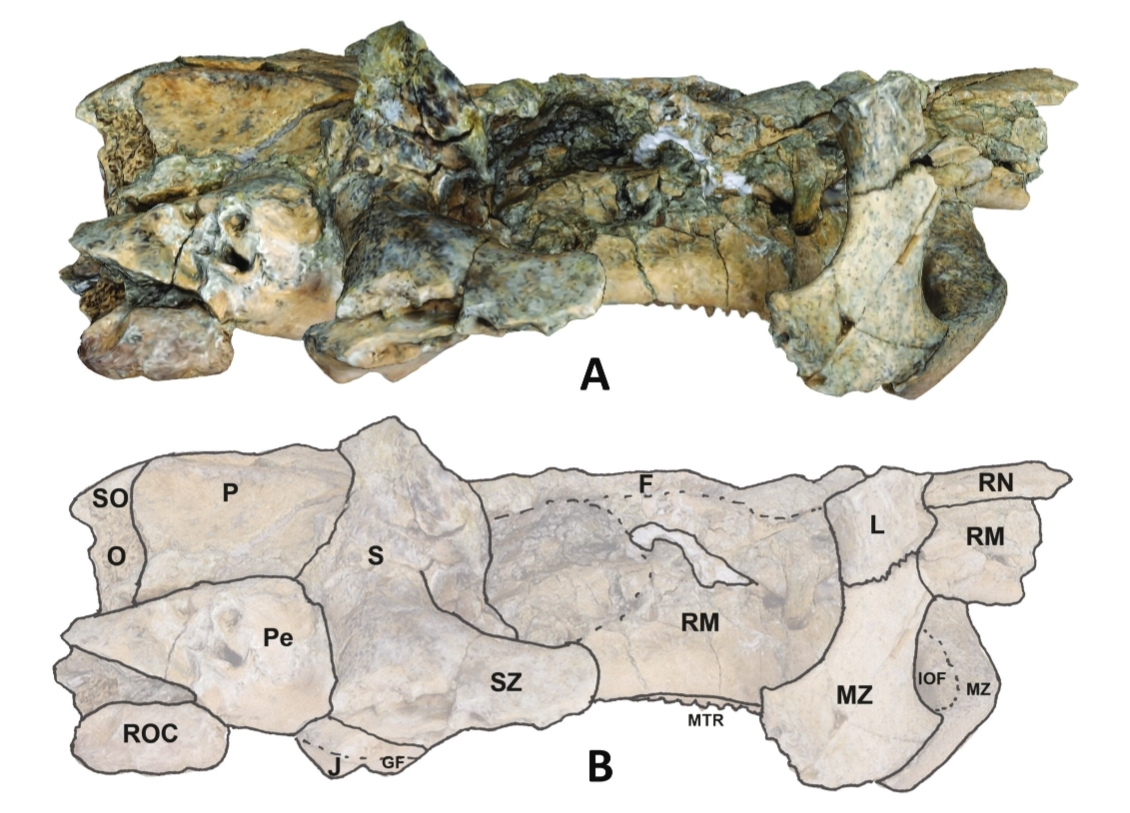

Scientific classification
- Kingdom: Animalia
- Phylum: Chordata
- Class: Mammalia
- Infraclass: Placentalia
- Order: Rodentia
- Family: Caviidae
- Genus: Hydrochoerus
- Species: †H. hesperotiganites

Binomial name
- †Hydrochoerus hesperotiganites White et al., 2022

= Hydrochoerus hesperotiganites =

Hydrochoerus hesperotiganites Temporal range: Pleistocene (Rancholabrean) 0.130–0.080 Ma

Species of capybara

Hydrochoerus hesperotiganites is an extinct species of capybara that lived in San Diego County, California, during the Rancholabrean stage of the Pleistocene (between 130,000 and 80,000 years ago). It is currently the only known capybara of the genus Hydrochoerus found in North America. It was closely related to the modern Greater and Lesser Capybara.

== History and naming ==
The holotype specimen of H. hesperotiganites was collected by Bradford O. Riney of the San Diego Natural History Museum during mitigation monitoring at the Town Center North shopping center, Oceanside, California, on March 5, 1994. The fossil was recovered from the lower of two stratigraphic units consisting of sandstone, mudstone, and siltstone dating to the Pleistocene. The sediments more specifically most likely date to the Rancholabrean based on typical mammal fauna of that age and the presence of Bison latifrons from possibly correlative strata upriver from the locality.

The species name "hesperotiganites", first published in 2022 in the journal Vertebrate Anatomy Morphology Palaeontology, translates to "western pancake" from the Greek words "hesperos" (western) and "tiganites" (pancake), chosen to reflect both the geographic location of the holotype skull as well as its crushed state.

== Evolution ==
Capybaras are the only caviomorph rodents besides the new world porcupines that managed to colonize temperate North America during the Pliocene and Pleistocene stages of the Great American Interchange. Capybaras are present in North America in the form of three genera, Neochoerus from Pliocene to Pleistocene Mexico, Texas, Florida and South Carolina, Phugatherium from late Blancan Florida and Arizona and Hydrochoerus hesperotiganites from the Rancholabrean of California. This makes H. hesperotiganites the only member of the extant genus Hydrochoerus to have made it into the United States, with any species previously referred to Hydrochoerus subsequently being considered to be part of Neochoerus.

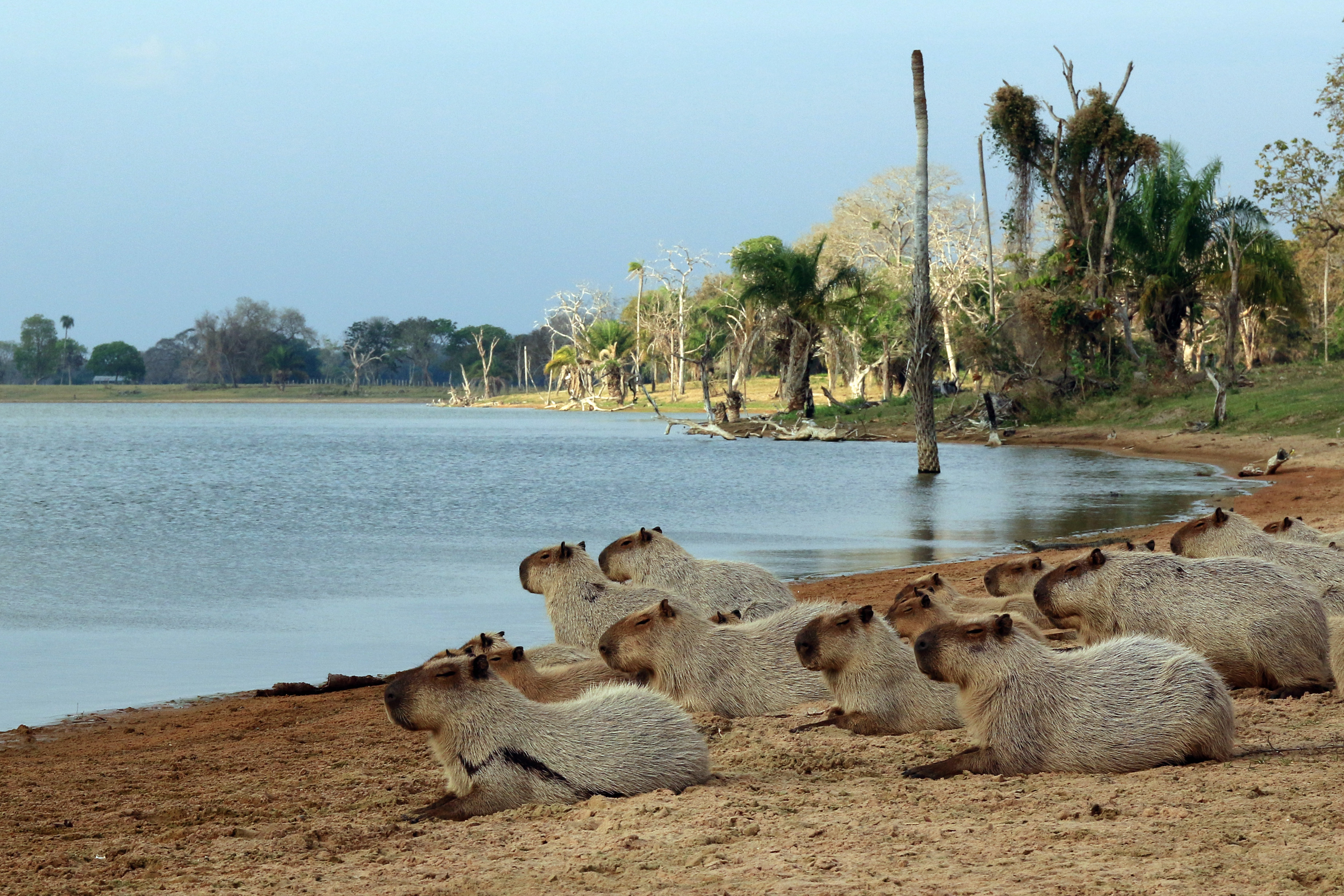
Modern capybaras in the Pantanal

This however presents a problem regarding the dispersal of Hydrochoerus into North America, as there is no indication for their presence between San Diego County and the northernmost extent of their current range (the Lesser Capybara in Panama) and the only known fossil remains of capybaras in Central America belong to Neochoerus. Tracing the route Hydrochoerus could have taken to reach California is subsequently difficult, with White et al. proposing two different paths. Both begin with the ancestors of H. hesperotiganites traveling along the Pacific coastline of Sinaloa and Sonora, before two different paths become available. The first would have led them further along the coast and up the Colorado River. However, to reach the San Luis Rey River overland travel would have been necessary with permanent water sources being rare, thusly this route is deemed the less likely of the two by the authors. The second route would have seen capybaras travel up some of the other rivers draining into the Gulf of California, traveling further north and eventually dispersing southwards. A similar route along the Rio Yaqui is known to have been taken by the other two capybara genera as they spread throughout Northern Mexico. White and colleagues further suggest that increased sampling of Pleistocene localities in Mexico might help resolve the matter.

== Paleoenvironment ==
The sediments H. hesperotiganites was discovered in where fluvial-lacustrine in nature and have been interpreted to represent what was once a freshwater pond or oxbow lake. The lake was formed atop of eroded Eocene strata, likely as the ancestral San Luis Rey River deposited sediments across its floodplains. The presence of changing layers of silt- and sandstone indicates that sediment input changed across the seasons. The upper layers indicate that the river was eventually meandering south again, forming yet another oxbow lake while the floodplains were aggrading. As most mammal remains are isolated, it's been proposed that mammalian corpses washed ashore, where parts decomposed and fossilized while others were transported further downriver.

The lower strata preserve little fauna, only consisting of the capybara remains as well as those of Stockoceros, a relative of the pronghorn. The slightly younger units however show a diverse fauna including pond turtles, grebes, pelicans, ducks coots, rails as well as various other shore- and songbirds. Mammals are likewise diverse and abundant, with scientists having recovered the fossils of grey foxes, tapirs, horses, the American Mastodon as well as the ground sloths Nothrotheriops and Megalonyx. The presence of abundant waterfowl and shorebird all match the environment these strata represented during the Pleistocene and also matches the presence of Capybaras, known to inhabit areas close to bodies of water in modern South America.
