= Kurloff cell =

Cells found in the blood and organs of guinea pigs and capybara

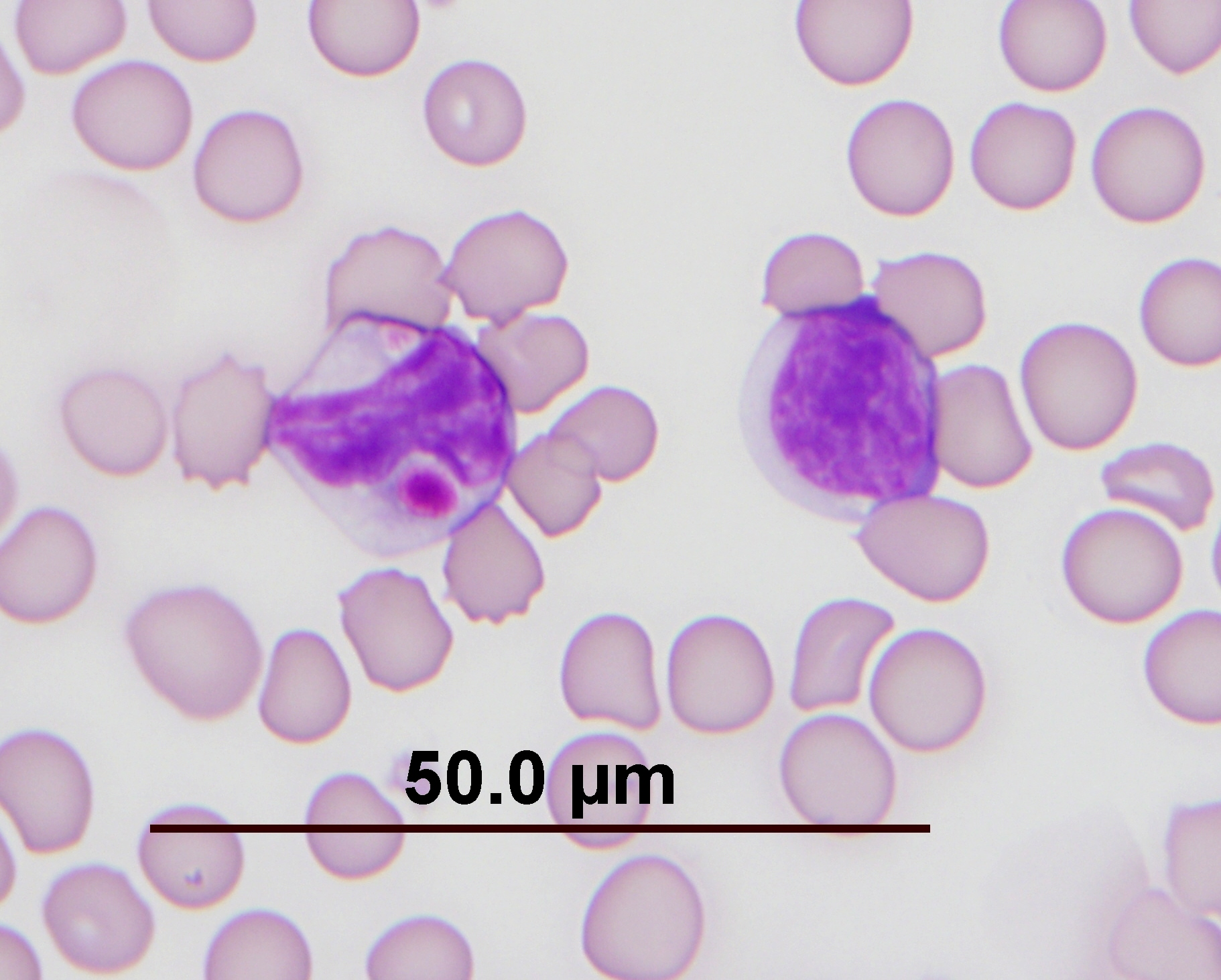
- Kurloff cell and a lymphocyte in a Guinea pig

Details
- Location: blood and organs of guinea pigs and capybara

Kurloff cells (also known as Foà-Kurloff cells) are cells in the peripheral blood and organs of the guinea pig, capybara, paca, agouti and cavie. The Kurloff cell contains a characteristic proteoglycan-containing inclusion body. In the guinea pig, Kurloff cells are more numerous in the adult female than the adult male. A marked increase in the number of circulating Kurloff cells is present in the peripheral blood during pregnancy and after estrogen treatment in male and female animals. A relatively smaller number of cells take place in immature, non-pregnant, and non-estrogen-treated animals. The exact function of Kurloff cells remains unknown, but it has some of the characteristics of both monocytes and lymphocytes. In guinea-pigs, it has been proposed that Kurloff cells mainly involve in the function of the immune system, such as acting as a natural killer cell and preventing damage to the trophoblast by maternal defensive cells. Also, Kurloff cells present antibody-dependent cytotoxic activity in vitro.

== Structure ==
The structure of Kurloff cell was identified using light microscopy and periodic-acid Schiff staining. The Kurloff cell has an egg shape and the axis of the cell varies from 8 to 12 μm in length, and 10-25 μm in diameter. The inclusion body, which is round in shape and 1-8 μm in diameter, occupies most of the cell's cytoplasm. Also, the inclusion body resembles a lymphocyte. The nucleus of Kurloff cell is sickle-shaped and is pushed toward the periphery of the cell by the inclusion body.

In thymus and spleen, Kurloff cells are categorized depending on the size and the number of inclusion bodies within cells. The cells with small and medium-sized inclusions are present when the density of thymocytes is low. On the other hand, cells with large inclusion bodies were first observed among low-density cells. Over time, they are found where the density of thymocytes is high.

== Tissue distribution ==
In pregnant and estrogen-treated male and female guinea pigs, clumps of Kurloff cells containing inclusion bodies of different sizes are present in large numbers in stromal tissue of the thymus and bone marrows, and the pulp cords of the spleen. In the thymus, clumps of Kurloff cells are occasionally seen at the cortico-medullary junction, scattered single cells are seen in the cortex, and numerous Kurloff cells are spotted in lymphatics and venules. In the spleen, Kurloff cells are absent in the lymphoid tissue of the white pulp, whereas there are large numbers in the red pulp. In the vertebral bone marrow, Kurloff cells are seen scattered as single cells and in clumps in random pattern among the hematopoietic cells in the stroma. Besides, the veins and lymphatic vessels of these tissues contain a significantly large number of Kurloff cells relative to the numbers in the arterial blood supply. It has been suggested that Kurloff cells might be produced at these sites. A small amount of Kurloff cells are observed within lymph nodes, and those which are present are in sinuses and blood vessels. During pregnancy and after treatment, a large number of Kurloff cells circulated in the blood. At the placenta of a pregnant guinea pig, Kurloff cells are more concentrated at the vascular channels of the labyrinth than the plasmodial spongy zone

== Characteristics ==
In guinea pig, the Kurloff cells have some characteristics of monocytes and lymphocytes. The first characteristic that Kurloff cells share with monocytes is the presence in the blood and organ but absence from the spleen white pulp, thymus parenchyma, and lymph node follicles. The second shared characteristic is that the Kurloff cell has a receptor for cytophilic immunoglobin. On the other hand, Kurloff cells have many lymphocytic features such as it does not contain lysosomes or phagosomes, lack of nonspecific esterase activity, and phagocytic capacity, and last, the Kurloff cell with the early inclusion body possesses a lymphocyte morphology. The results of antibody-dependent cellular cytotoxicity assay on guineas-pig Kurloff cells strongly indicate an immunological role of the cells as the natural killer cell. The data also suggest that the Kurloff cell is probably the predominant cytotoxic line in guinea pig lymphocyte composition, and different level of killer cell activities depends mostly on varying degrees of Kurloff cell contamination.

The Kurloff cells were suggested to have an impact on the immunological status of the guinea-pig placenta. The fate of cells in pregnant guineas pig has been studied by immunofluorescent methods, including an antiserum against the isolated mucoprotein of the inclusion body. The satisfactory staining of the inclusion particle was extracted from the spleen and thymus. Immunofluorescence results showed that during pregnancy circulating Kurloff cells release their inclusion particles inside the trophoblast. In the placenta, the Kurloff cell was occasionally surrounded by a cloud of tiny droplets of material, which gives a similar staining result as the inclusion particles. That material was frequently observed displaying on the luminal surface of the inner placenta compartment. It was obvious that the Kurloff cell must have a role during pregnancy in the guinea-pig because of a significant increase in the number of these cells in the blood and tissues. The inclusion material has been proved to prevent immunological damage to target cells when purified. Studies were done on the effect of extracted inclusion body material in purified form, on inflammatory cells in vitro. The results showed marked toxic effects on macrophages with first clumping follow by cell death. The evidence suggests that Kurloff cells may play a part in preventing immunological damage to the trophoblast by maternal defensive cells.

== See also ==
- Resistance to cancer in naked mole rats
- Russell bodies
