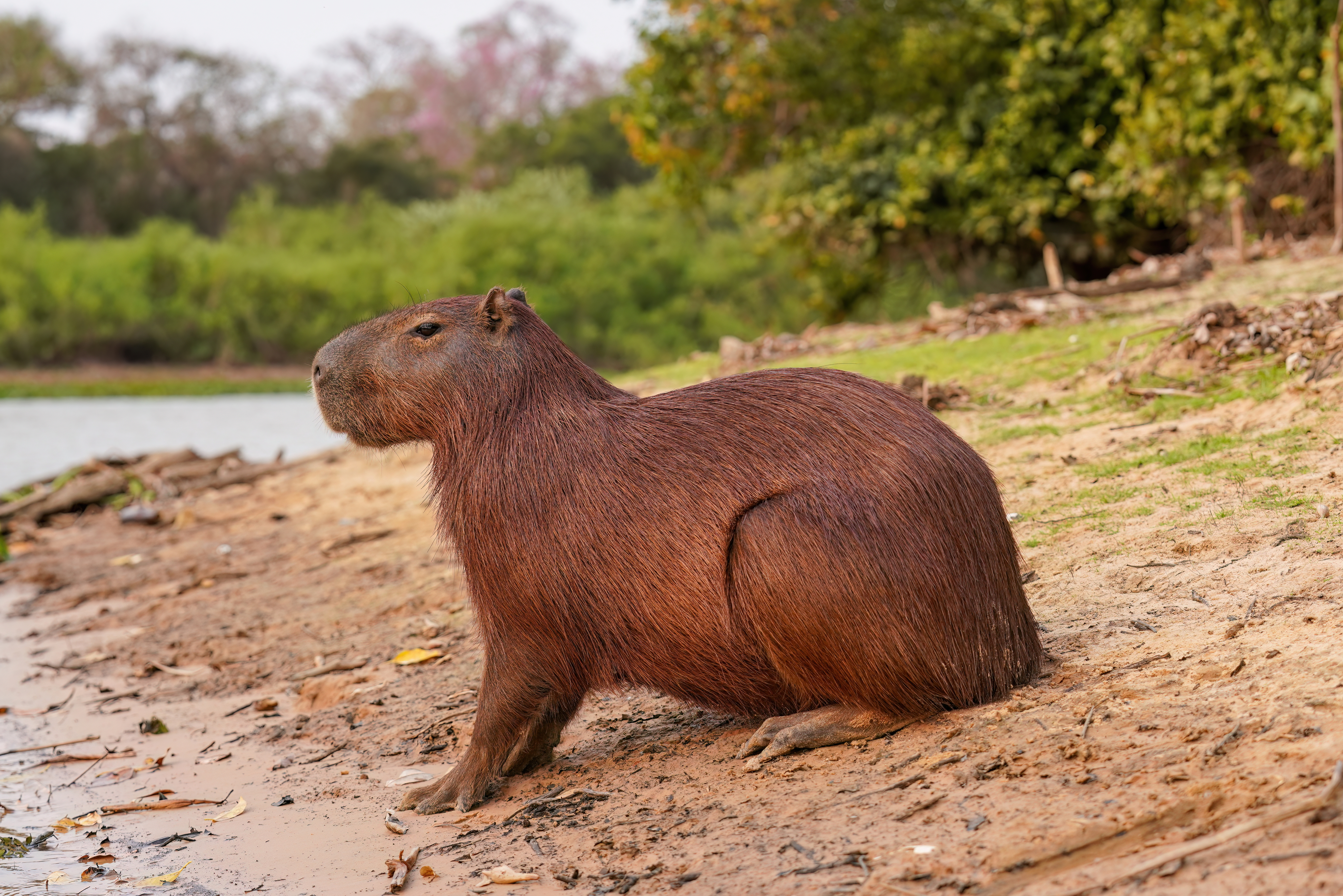
- In Encontro das Águas State Park, Brazil

Conservation status
- Least Concern (IUCN 3.1)

Scientific classification
- Kingdom: Animalia
- Phylum: Chordata
- Class: Mammalia
- Order: Rodentia
- Family: Caviidae
- Genus: Hydrochoerus
- Species: H. hydrochaeris

Binomial name
- Hydrochoerus hydrochaeris (Linnaeus, 1766)
- Native range

Synonyms
- Sus hydrochaeris Linnaeus, 1766

= Capybara =

Capybara Temporal range: Late Pleistocene–Present

Largest species of rodents

The capybara (/kæpɪˈbɑːrə/ kap-ih-BAR-uh) (Note: Other names include capivara (in Brazil), capiguara (in Bolivia), chigüire, chigüiro, and fercho (in Colombia and Venezuela), carpincho (in Argentina, Paraguay and Uruguay) and ronsoco (in Peru).) or greater capybara (Hydrochoerus hydrochaeris) is the largest living rodent, native to all countries in South America except Chile. It is a semiaquatic herbivore that inhabits savannas and dense forests, living near and in bodies of freshwater and feeding mainly on grasses and aquatic plants.

Together with the lesser capybara, it constitutes the genus Hydrochoerus. Its other close relatives include guinea pigs and rock cavies, and it is more distantly related to the agouti, the chinchilla, and the nutria.

The capybara is a highly social species that usually lives in groups of 10–20 individuals, but can be found in groups as large as 100. It is hunted for its meat and hide and for grease from its thick fatty skin.

== Etymology ==
Its common name is derived from Tupi ka'apiûara, a complex agglutination of kaá (leaf) + píi (slender) + ú (eat) + ara (a suffix for agent nouns), meaning "one who eats slender leaves", or "grass-eater". The genus name, hydrochoerus, comes from Greek ὕδωρ (hýdor "water") and χοῖρος (choíros "pig, hog") and the species name, hydrochaeris, comes from Greek ὕδωρ (hýdor "water") and χαίρω (chairo "feel happy, enjoy").

== Classification and phylogeny ==
The capybara and the lesser capybara are both rodents belonging to the subfamily Hydrochoerinae along with the rock cavies. The living capybaras and their extinct relatives were previously classified in their own family Hydrochoeridae. Since 2002, molecular phylogenetic studies have recognized a close relationship between Hydrochoerus and Kerodon, the rock cavies, supporting placement of both genera in a subfamily of Caviidae.

The presence of the greater capybara, Hydrochoerus hydrochaeris, in the fossil record ranges from the late Pleistocene to the present day.

Among fossil species, the term "capybara" can refer to the many species of Hydrochoerinae that are more closely related to the modern Hydrochoerus than they are to the "cardiomyine" rodents like Cardiomys. The fossil genera Cardiatherium, Phugatherium, Hydrochoeropsis, and Neochoerus are all capybaras under that definition.

Paleontological classifications previously used Hydrochoeridae for all capybaras, while using Hydrochoerinae for the living genus and its closest fossil relatives, such as Neochoerus, but more recently have adopted the classification of Hydrochoerinae within Caviidae. The taxonomy of fossil hydrochoerines is also in a state of flux. In recent years, the diversity of fossil hydrochoerines has been substantially reduced. This is largely due to the recognition that capybara molar teeth show strong variation in shape over the life of an individual. In one instance, material referred to four genera and seven species on the basis of differences in molar shape was later thought to represent differently aged individuals of a single species, Cardiatherium paranense.

== Description ==
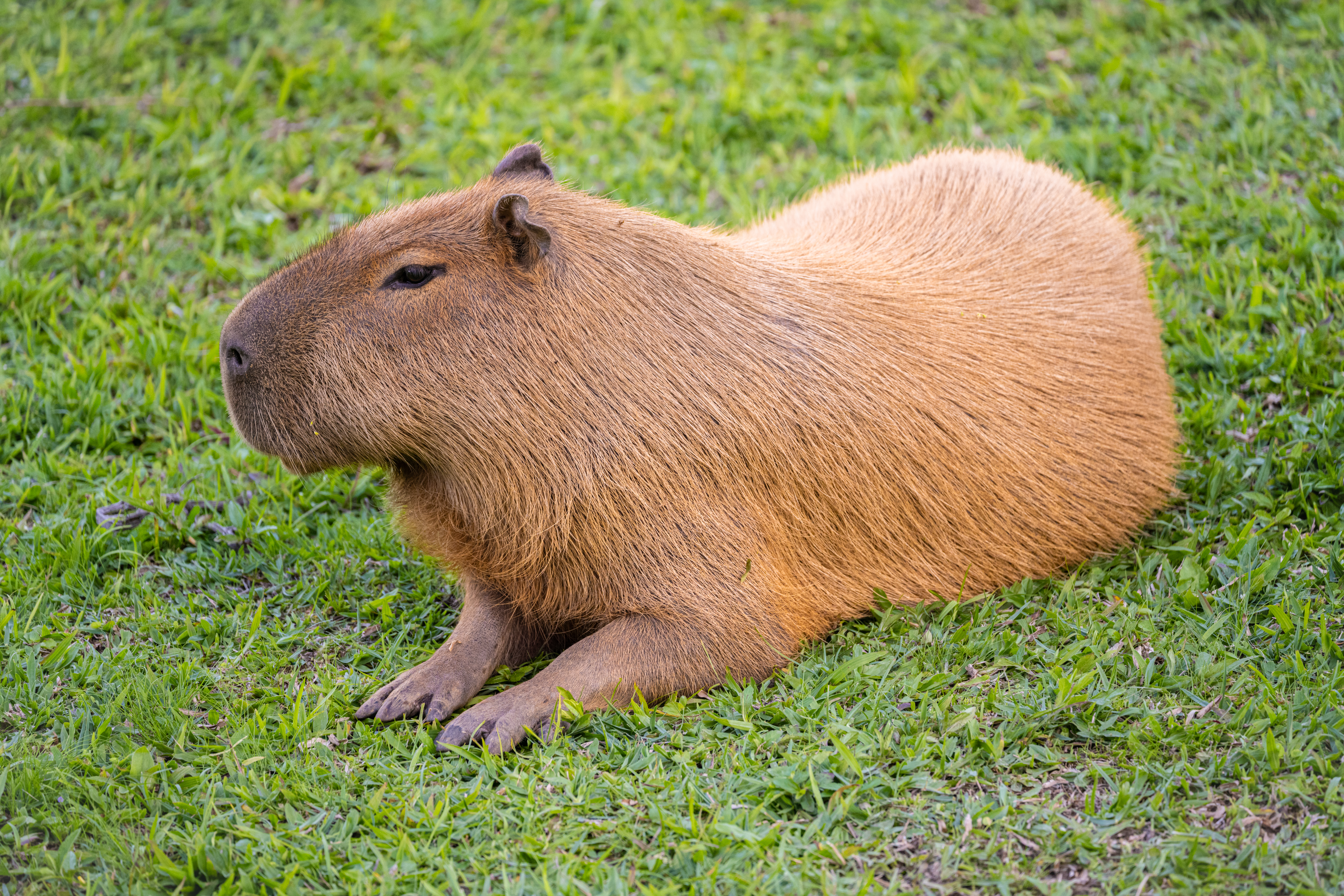
Capybara in Petrópolis, Brazil

The capybara has a heavy, barrel-shaped body and a broad head, with reddish-brown fur on the upper part of its body that turns yellowish-brown underneath. Its sweat glands can be found in the surface of the hairy portions of its skin, an unusual trait among rodents. Its coarse fur ranges in length from 30 to 120mm. It lacks underhair, and there is no real distinction between guard hair and overhair in its fur.

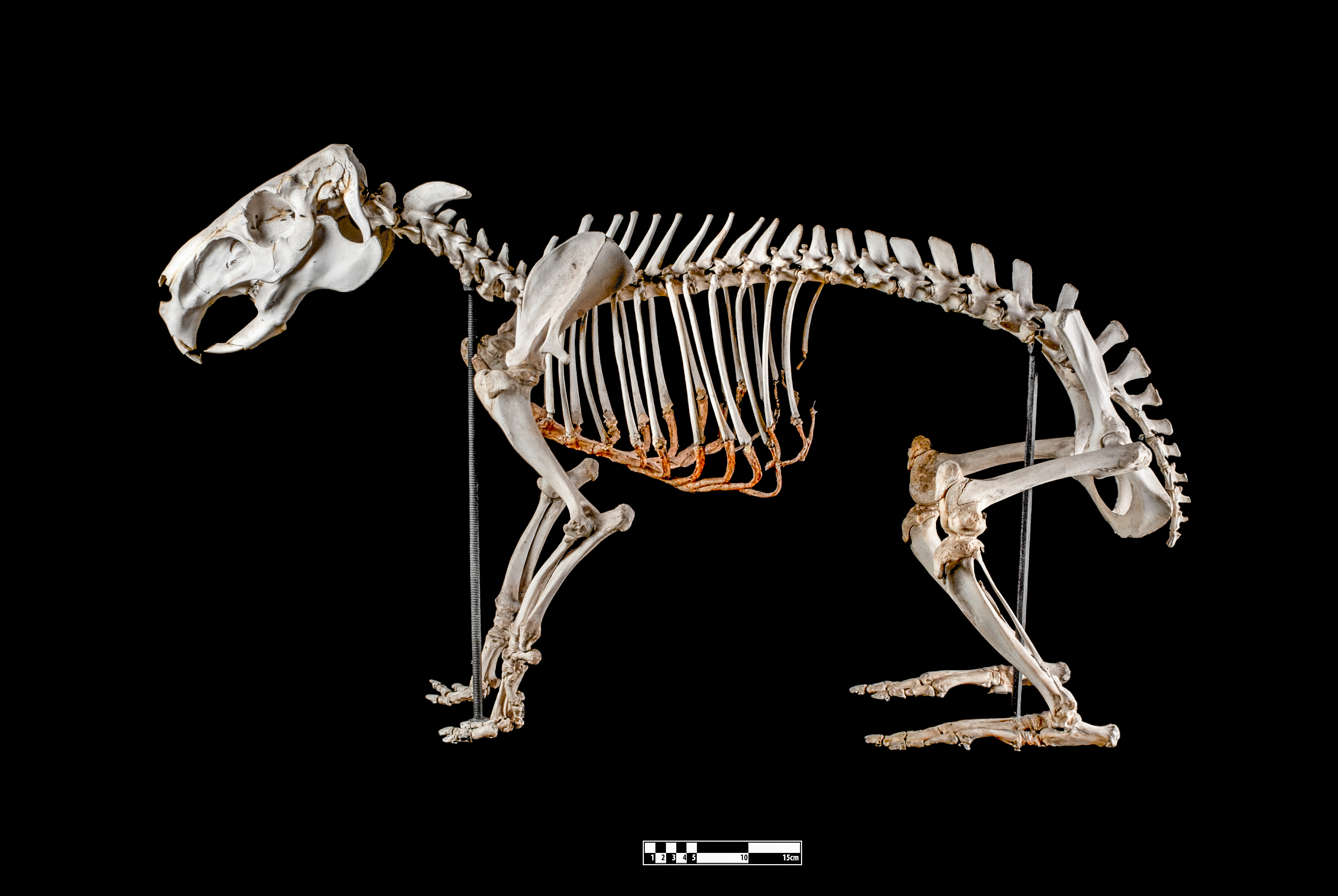
Skeleton of a capybara

Adult capybaras grow to 106 to 134 cm (3.48 to 4.40 ft) in length, stand 50 to 62 cm (20 to 24 in) tall at the withers, and typically weigh 35 to 66 kg (77 to 146 lb), with an average in the Venezuelan Llanos of 48.9 kg (108 lb). Females are slightly heavier than males. The top recorded weights are 91 kg (201 lb) for a wild female from Brazil and 73.5 kg (162 lb) for a wild male from Uruguay. Also, an 81 kg individual was reported in São Paulo in 2001 or 2002. The dental formula is 1.0.1.31.0.1.3. Capybaras have slightly webbed feet and vestigial tails. Their hind legs are slightly longer than their forelegs; they have three toes on their rear feet and four toes on their front feet. Their muzzles are blunt, with nostrils, and the eyes and ears are near the top of their heads.

Its karyotype has 2n = 66 and FN = 102, meaning it has 66 chromosomes with a total of 102 arms.

== Ecology ==
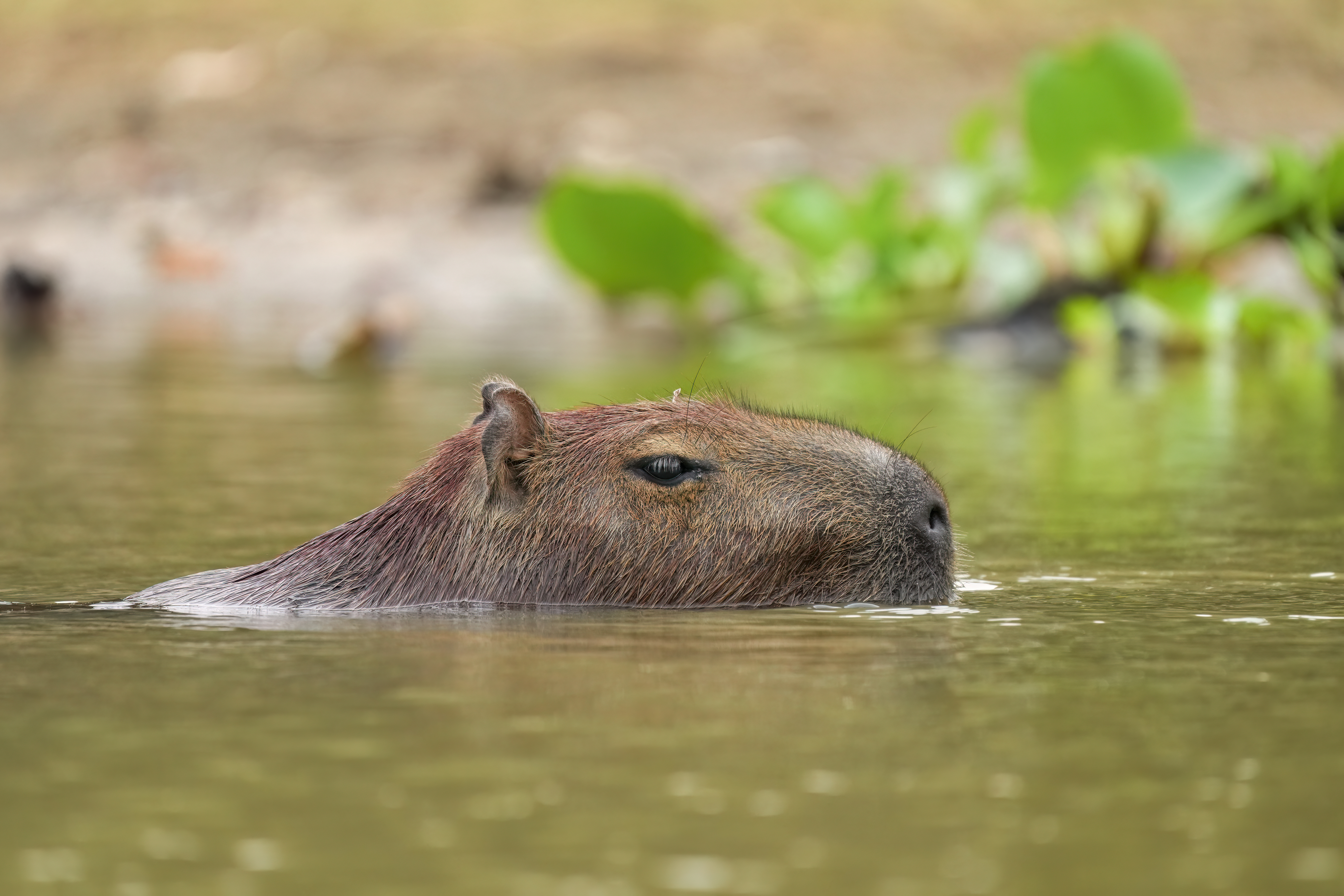
Capybara swimming in Encontro das Águas State Park, Brazil

Capybaras are found in all countries in South America except Chile. They are semiaquatic and live near bodies of freshwater, including rivers, lakes, ponds, streams, swamps and reservoirs. They are found in habitats such as seasonally flooded savannas, wetlands, and gallery forests, and along rivers in tropical rainforests. Capybaras live mostly in lowlands, and the highest elevation they have been recorded at is 1500m, in the Chapada dos Veadeiros National Park. Capybaras have flourished in cattle ranches.

Many escapees from captivity can also be found in similar watery habitats around the world. Sightings are fairly common in Florida, although a breeding population has not yet been confirmed. In 2011, a capybara was spotted on the Central Coast of California. These escaped populations occur in areas where prehistoric capybaras inhabited; late Pleistocene capybaras inhabited Florida and Hydrochoerus hesperotiganites in California and Hydrochoerus gaylordi in Grenada, and feral capybaras in North America may actually fill the ecological niche of the Pleistocene species.

=== Activities ===
Capybaras are superb swimmers and can hold their breath underwater for up to five minutes at a time. In the morning, they rest on dry land. They then spend the hot early afternoon in the water to keep cool, after which they graze during the late afternoon and night until the Sun rises.

The home ranges of capybara groups vary from 5 to 16 hectares. They normally include the different elements necessary for the capybaras' lifestyle, including a permanent body of water, grassland to graze on and an area of dry land used for resting. Most capybaras do not migrate great distances; in a study in which wild capybaras were marked and then recaptured 2 years later, 40% were recaptured within 100m of the marking site and 80% within 1000m.

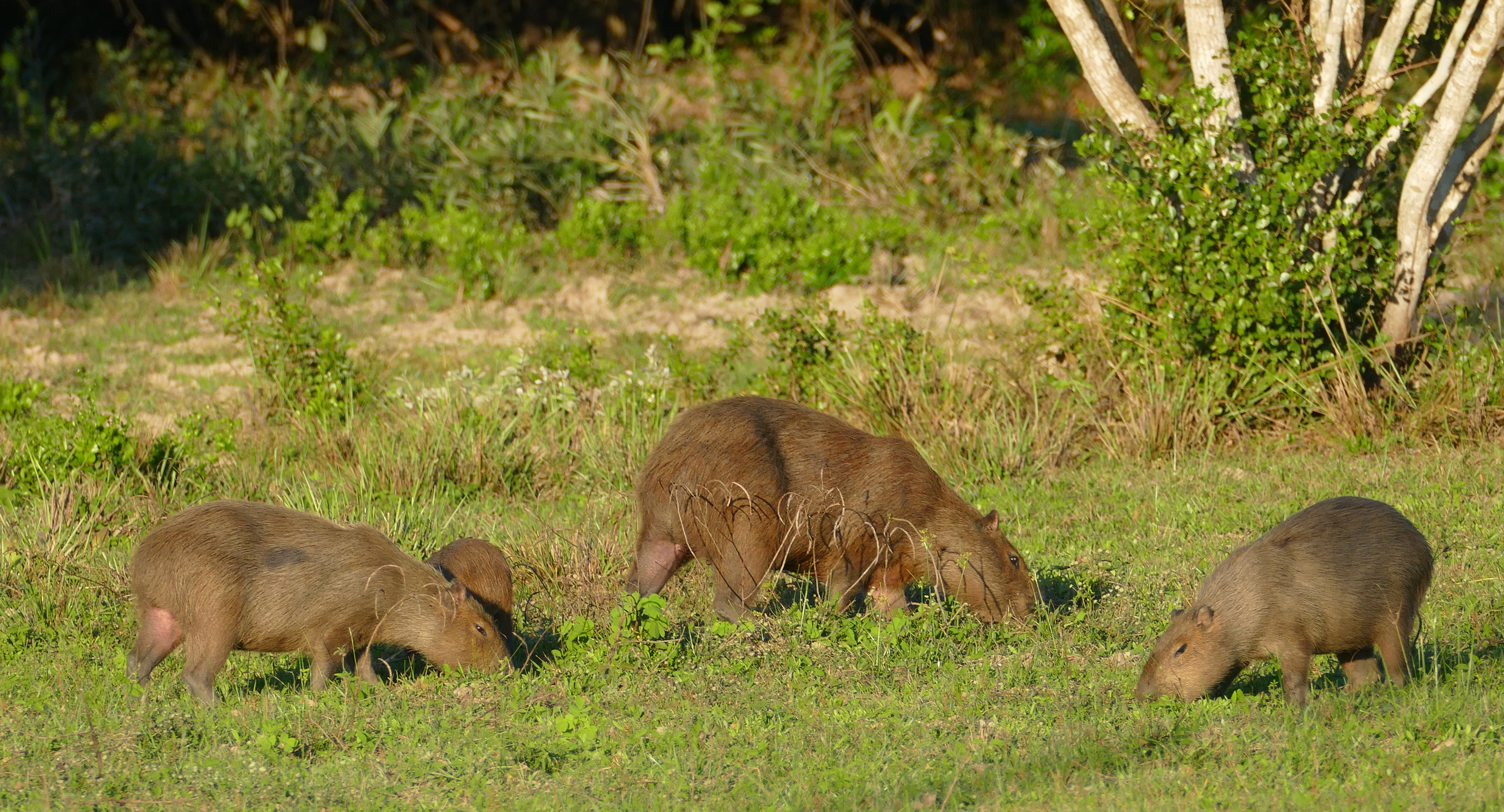
Capybaras grazing

=== Diet ===
Capybaras are herbivores, grazing mainly on grasses and aquatic plants, as well as fruit and tree bark. They are very selective feeders and feed on the leaves of one species and disregard other species surrounding it. They eat a greater variety of plants during the dry season, as fewer plants are available. While they eat grass during the wet season, they have to switch to more abundant reeds during the dry season. Plants that capybaras eat during the summer lose their nutritional value in the winter, so they are not consumed at that time.

The capybara's jaw hinge is not perpendicular, so they chew food by grinding back-and-forth rather than side-to-side. Capybaras are autocoprophagous, meaning they eat their own feces as a source of bacterial gut flora, to help digest the cellulose in the grass that forms their normal diet, and to extract the maximum protein and vitamins from their food. They also regurgitate food to masticate again, similar to cud-chewing by cattle. Like other rodents, a capybara's front teeth grow continually to compensate for the constant wear from eating grasses; their cheek teeth also grow continuously.

Like its relative the guinea pig, the capybara does not have the capacity to synthesize vitamin C, and capybaras not supplemented with vitamin C in captivity have been reported to develop gum disease as a sign of scurvy.

=== Predation ===
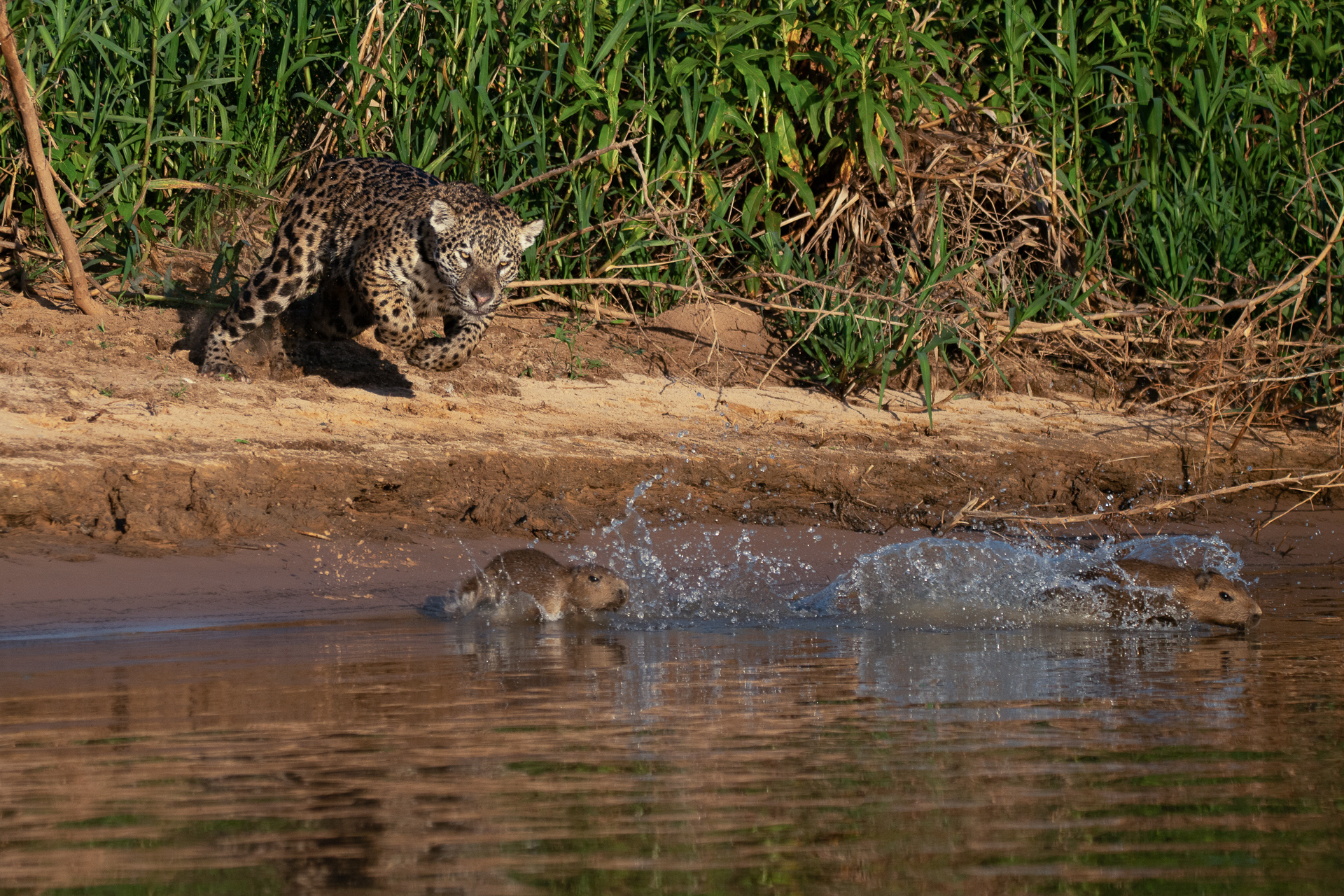
A jaguar hunting two juvenile capybaras

The maximum lifespan of the capybara is 8 to 10 years. In the wild, however, capybaras usually do not live longer than four years because of predation from South American cats such as jaguars, ocelots, and cougars and from non-mammalian predators such as eagles, caimans, and green anacondas.

=== Association with birds ===
A number of bird species associate with capybaras as a feeding strategy. These birds benefit from the presence of capybaras in several ways: as capybaras move across the ground, they flush out arthropods hiding in the vegetation which the birds can catch and eat. A bird making use of this may either follow the capybara on the ground, or perch on the capybara's back and swoop down when they spot prey. This is a commensal interaction in which the bird benefits and the capybara is unaffected. Birds also eat parasites from the skin of capybaras, staying near or on capybaras to do so. This is a mutualistic interaction in which both the bird and capybara benefit. A bird species may engage in only one of these behaviours or both.

Capybaras are generally wholly indifferent to the presence of most of the bird species that associate with them. When approached by a yellow-headed caracara however, capybaras sometimes actively solicit parasite cleaning by exposing their flanks and underside.

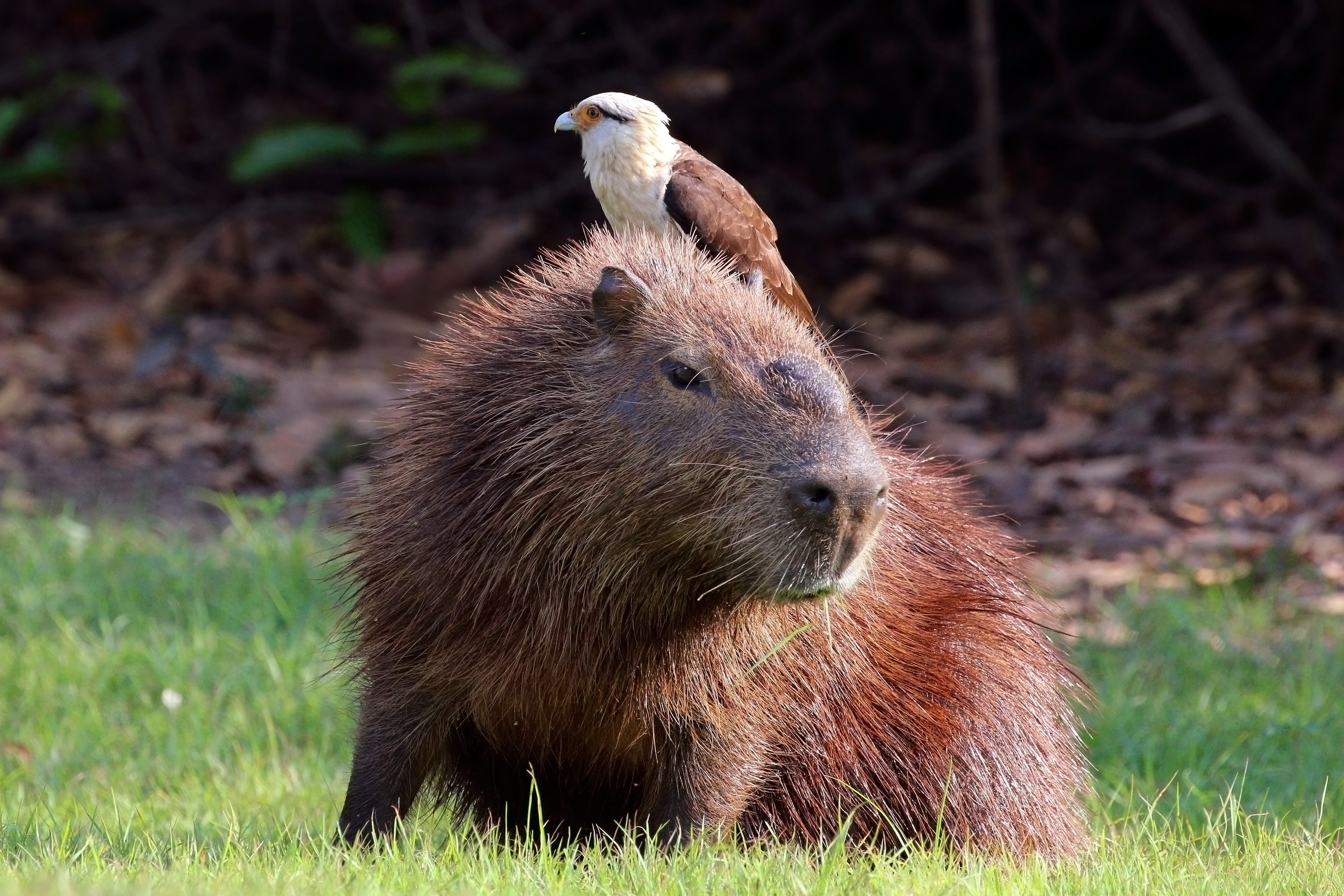
Yellow-headed caracara perching on a capybara

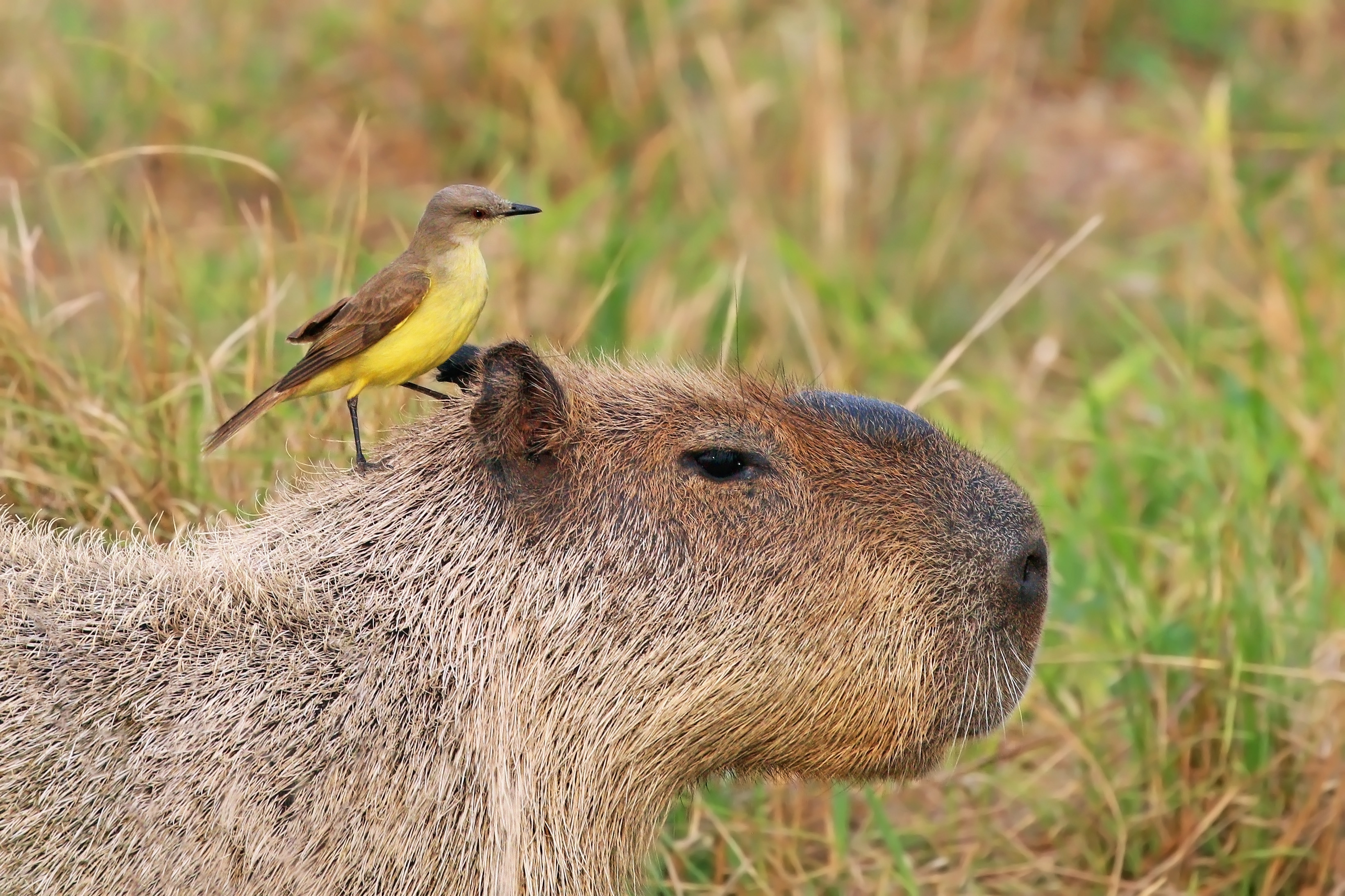
Cattle tyrant perching on a capybara

Birds that associate with capybaras include:

- Yellow-headed caracaras
- Rufous horneros
- Cattle tyrants
- Crested caracaras
- Shiny cowbirds
- Wattled jacanas
- Scarlet ibises
- Sharp-tailed ibises
- Western cattle egrets
- Buff-necked ibises
- American white ibises

== Social organization ==
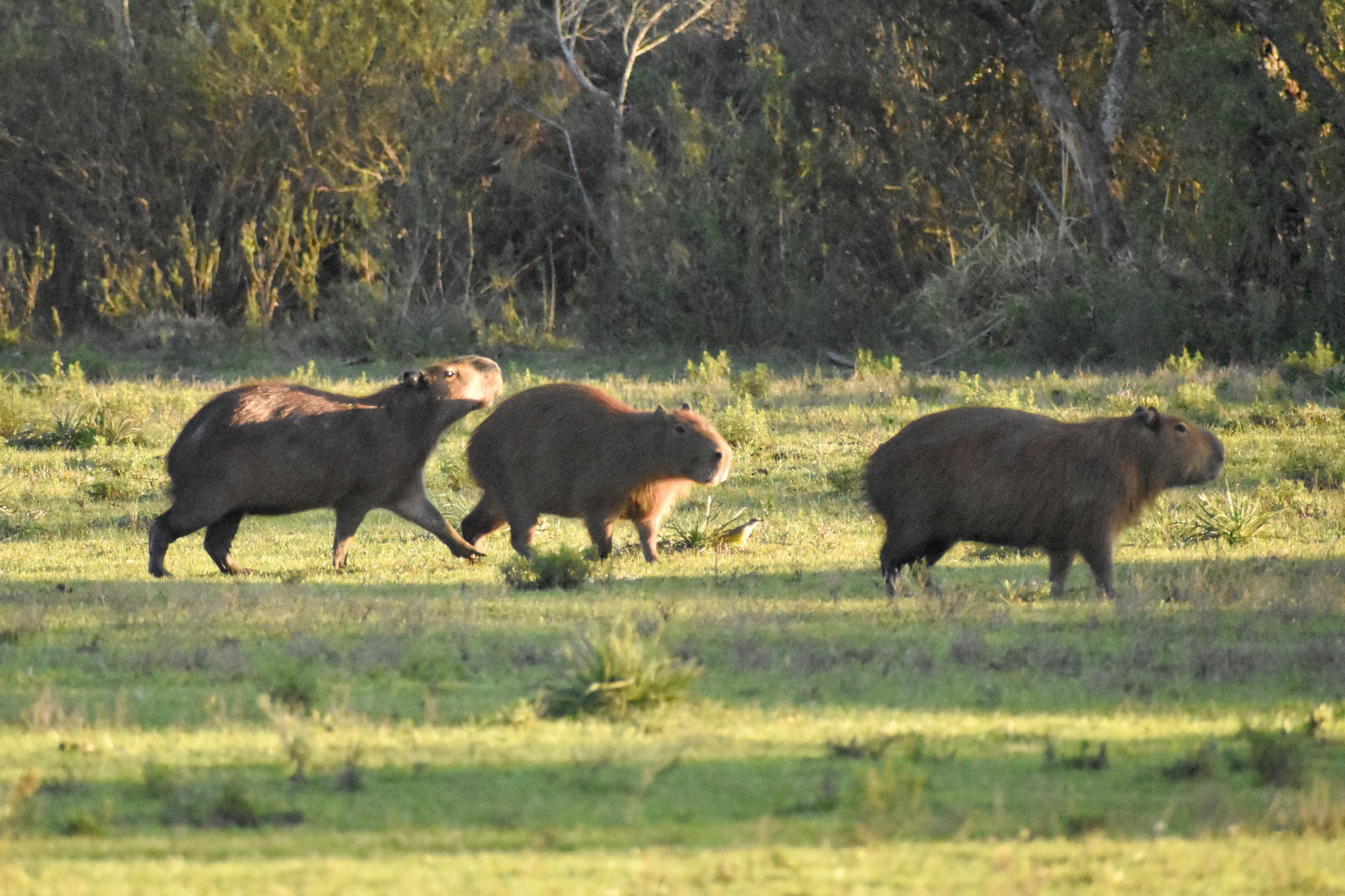
Trio of capybaras in El Palmar National Park, Argentina

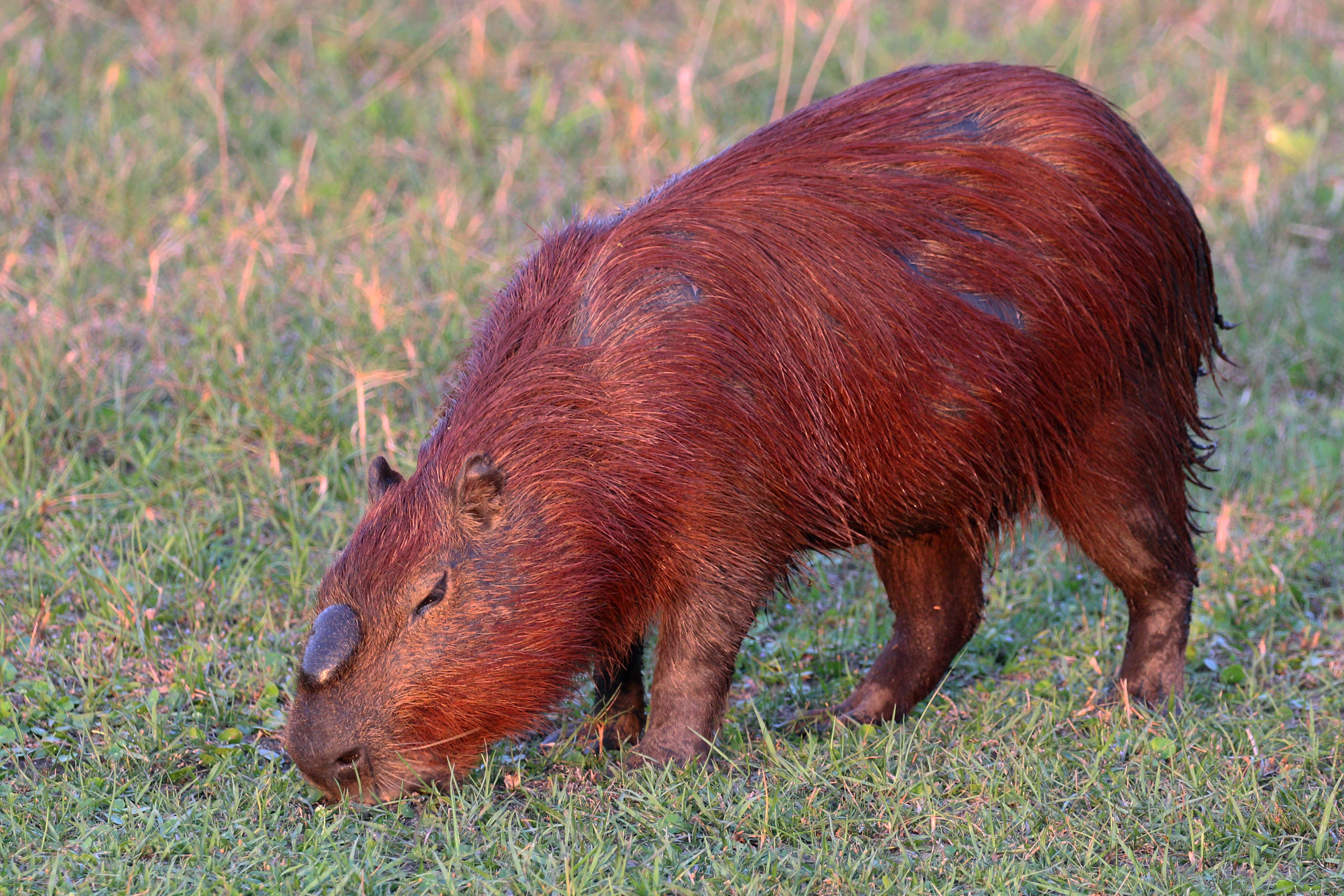
Male capybara with a visible morrillo on the snout

Capybaras are gregarious. While they sometimes live solitarily, they are more commonly found in groups of around 10–20 individuals, with two to four adult males, four to seven adult females, and the remainder juveniles. Capybara groups can consist of as many as 50 or 100 individuals during the dry season when the animals gather around available water sources. Males establish social bonds, dominance, or general group consensus. They can make dog-like barks when threatened or when females are herding young.

Capybaras have two types of scent glands: a morrillo, located on the snout, and anal glands. Both sexes have these glands, but males have much larger morrillos and use their anal glands more frequently. The anal glands of males are also lined with detachable hairs. A crystalline form of scent secretion is coated on these hairs and is released when in contact with objects such as plants. These hairs have a longer-lasting scent mark and are tasted by other capybaras. Capybaras scent-mark by rubbing their morrillos on objects, or by walking over scrub and marking it with their anal glands. Capybaras can spread their scent farther by urinating; however, females usually mark without urinating and scent-mark less frequently than males overall. Females mark more often during the wet season when they are in estrus. In addition to objects, males also scent-mark females.

=== Reproduction ===
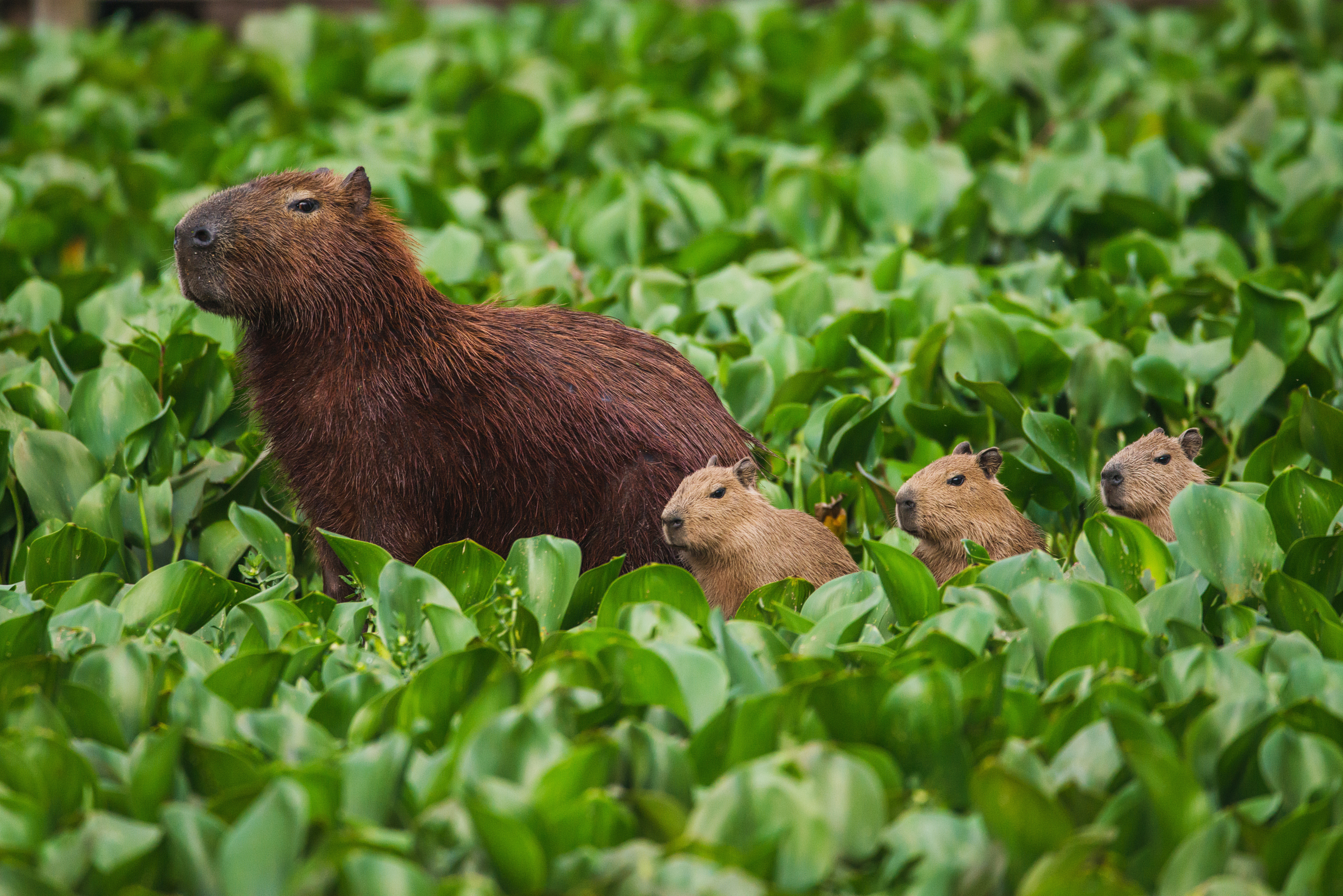
Mother with litter of pups

When in estrus, the female's scent changes subtly and nearby males begin pursuit. In addition, a female alerts males she is in estrus by whistling through her nose. During mating, the female has the advantage and mating choice. Capybaras mate only in water, and if a female does not want to mate with a certain male, she either submerges or leaves the water. Dominant males are highly protective of the females, but they usually cannot prevent some of the subordinates from copulating. The larger the group, the harder it is for the male to watch all the females. Dominant males secure significantly more matings than each subordinate, but subordinate males, as a class, are responsible for more matings than each dominant male. The lifespan of the capybara's sperm is longer than that of other rodents.

Capybara gestation is 130–150 days, and produces a litter of four young on average, but may produce between one and eight in a single litter. Birth is on land and the female rejoins the group within a few hours of delivering the newborn capybaras, which join the group as soon as they are mobile. Within a week, the young can eat grass, but continue to suckle—from any female in the group—until weaned around 16 weeks. The young form a group within the main group. Alloparenting has been observed in this species. Breeding peaks between April and May in Venezuela and between October and November in Mato Grosso, Brazil.

=== Communication ===
Capybaras communicate using barks, chirps, whistles, huffs, and purrs.

Capybaras in captivity, 2009

== Conservation and human interaction ==
Capybaras are not considered a threatened species; their population is stable throughout most of their South American range, though in some areas hunting has reduced their numbers. Capybaras are hunted for their meat and pelts in some areas, and otherwise killed by humans who see their grazing as competition for livestock. In some areas, they are farmed, which has the effect of ensuring the wetland habitats are protected. Their survival is aided by their ability to breed rapidly.

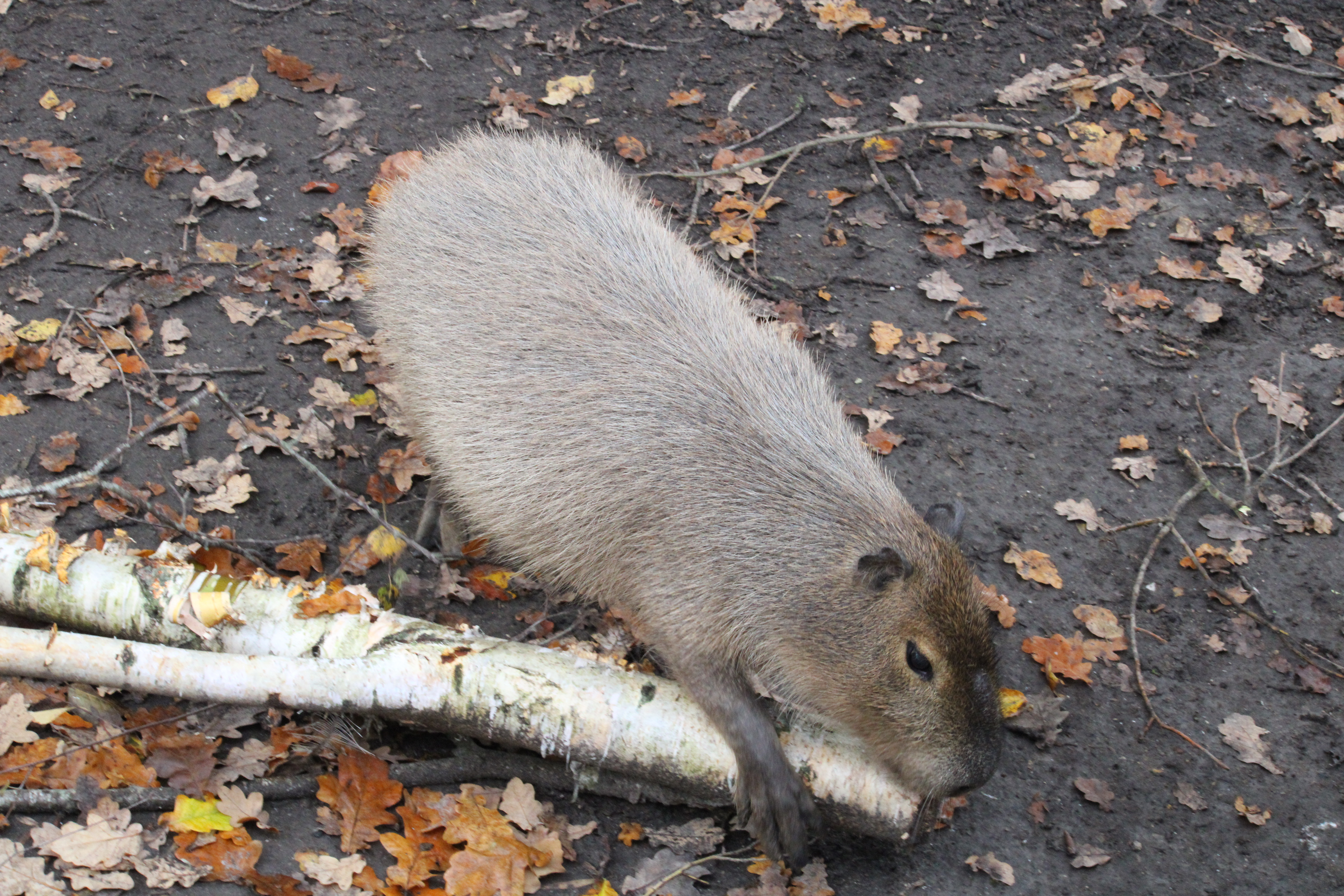
Captive capybara at Copenhagen Zoo, Denmark, in 2025

Capybaras have adapted well to urbanization in South America. They can be found in many areas in zoos and parks, and may live for 12 years in captivity, more than double their wild lifespan. Capybaras are docile and usually allow humans to pet and hand-feed them, but physical contact is normally discouraged, as their ticks can be vectors to Rocky Mountain spotted fever. The European Association of Zoos and Aquaria asked Drusillas Park in Alfriston, Sussex, England, to keep the studbook for capybaras, to monitor captive populations in Europe. The studbook includes information about all births, deaths and movements of capybaras, as well as how they are related.

Capybaras are farmed for meat and skins in South America. The meat is considered unsuitable to eat in some areas, while in other areas it is considered an important source of protein. In parts of South America, especially in Venezuela, capybara meat is popular during Lent and Holy Week as the Catholic Church (according to a legend) previously issued special dispensation to allow it to be eaten while other meats are generally forbidden. There is widespread perception in Venezuela that consumption of capybaras is exclusive to rural people.

Brazilian Lyme-like borreliosis likely involves capybaras as reservoirs and Amblyomma and Rhipicephalus ticks as vectors.

A capybara café in St. Augustine, Florida allows visitors to interact with and give head scratches to the rodents.

== In popular culture ==
Capybaras have amassed fandoms in Japan and China, particularly among youth. This has been attributed to their perception as role models of emotional well-being and harmoniousness. In Japan, Izu Shaboten Zoo and other zoos provide hot spring baths for capybaras. Video clips of the bathing capybaras have millions of views. These capybaras spawned a series of merchandise such as plush toys, and provided inspiration for the anime character Kapibara-san.

Capybaras have become a figure in meme culture in the 2020s. Common meme formats pair capybaras with the song "After Party" by Don Toliver. A song about capybaras was released and became highly popular on TikTok in 2022. Capybaras have gained a reputation as a symbol of calm due to their perceived "unflappability", and their personalities have been described as "buddha-like".

In August 2021, Argentine and international media reported that capybaras had been disrupting life in Nordelta, an affluent gated community north of Buenos Aires built atop the local capybara's preexisting wetland habitat. This inspired social media users to jokingly adopt the capybara as a symbol of class struggle and communism.

== See also ==
- Josephoartigasia monesi, an extinct species identified as the largest known rodent ever
- Kurloff cell, a type of cell found in capybaras and guinea pigs
- Capybara Walking, a historical animal locomotion film by Eadweard Muybridge
